= List of insect galls =

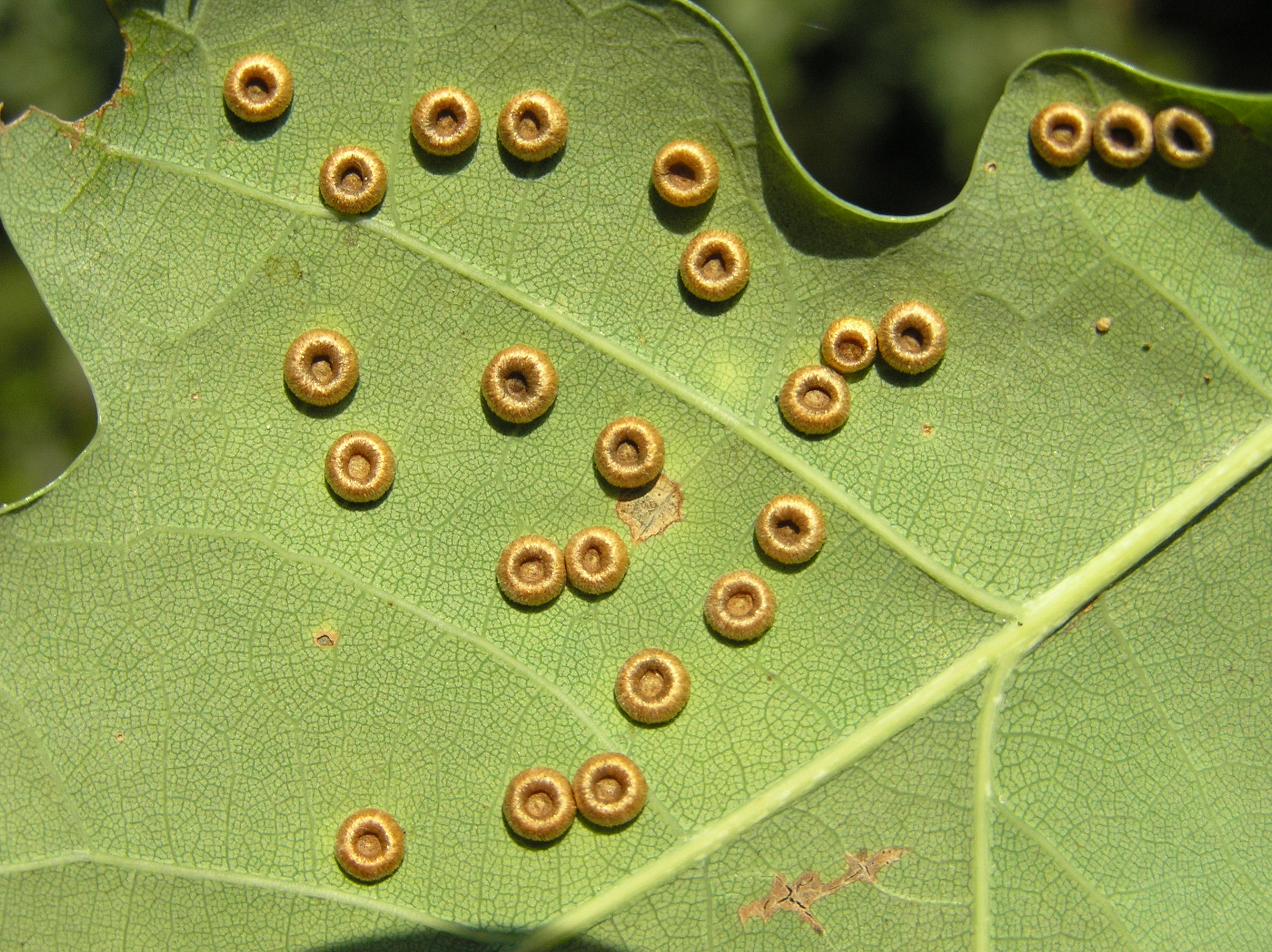
Leaf galls

This is a list of insect galls arranged into families.

== Coleoptera Beetles ==
=== Brentidae Straight-snouted Weevils ===
- Podapion gallicola

=== Cerambycidae Longhorn beetle ===
- Saperda fayi - Thorn-limb Borer
- Saperda populnea - Small Poplar Borer

=== Curculionidae Weevils ===
- Ampeloglypter ampelopsis
- Anthonomus nigrinus
- Cryptorhynchus lapathi - Poplar-and-Willow Borer
- Dorytomus taeniatus
- Lixus musculus
- Rhinusa pilosa
- Smicronyx sculpticollis - Dodder Gall Weevil

== Diptera Flies ==
=== Anthomyiidae Anthomyiid Flies ===
- Chirosia betuleti - Knotting Gall

=== Agromyzidae Leaf-Miner Flies ===
- Agromyza deserta
- Hexomyza simplicoides
- Japanagromyza lonchocarpi
- Euhexomyza schineri - Poplar Twiggall Fly

=== Cecidomyiidae Gall Midges ===
- Ampelomyia viticola - Grape Tube Gallmaker
- Ampelomyia vitiscoryloides - Grape Filbert Gall Midge
- Ampelomyia vitispomum
- Ametrodiplosis fistulosae (Monarda fistulosa)
- Acericecis ocellaris - Ocellate Gall Midge
- Anisostephus betulinus (birch)
- Asphondylia auripila - Large Creosote Gall Midge
- Ampelomyia conicocoricis (grape)
- Asphondylia solidaginis (a goldenrod midge gall)
- Asteromyia carbonifera - Carbonifera Goldenrod Gall Midge
- Anthodiplosis eutrochii (Joe-Pye weed)
- Arnoldiola atra (oak)
- Asteromyia euthamiae (grass-leaved goldenrod)
- Asteromyia modesta (fleabane)
- Asteromyia tumifica (goldenrod stem)
- Astictoneura muhlenbergiae (Mexican muhly)
- Blaesodiplosis canadensis (shadbush)
- Blaesodiplosis crataegifolia (hawthorn)
- Blaesodiplosis venae (hawthorn)
- Caryomyia - Hickory Gall Midges
- Caryomyia caryae - Hickory Sticky Globe Gall Midge
- Caryomyia caryaecola - Hickory Onion Gall Midge
- Caryomyia hirtiglobus (Hickory)
- Caryomyia holotricha (Hickory)
- Caryomyia persicoides Hickory Peach-Haired Gall Midge
- Caryomyia purpurea Hickory
- Caryomyia sanguinolenta Hickory Smooth Gumdrop Gall Midge
- Caryomyia thompsoni Hickory Placenta Gall Midge
- Caryomyia tubicola Hickory Bullet Gall Midge
- Caryomyia viscidolium Hickory
- Celticecis aciculata hackberries
- Celticecis capsularis hackberries
- Celticecis celtiphyllia hackberries
- Celticecis pubescens hackberries
- Celticecis spiniformis Hackberry Thorn Gall Midge
- Contarinia cerasiserotinae
- Contarinia citrina
- Contarinia coloradensis Ponderosa Pine
- Contarinia loti
- Contarinia nasturtii Swede Midge
- Contarinia negundinis Boxelder Gall Midge
- Contarinia quinquenotata Hemerocallis Gall Midge
- Contarinia verrucicola Linden Wart Gall Midge
- Contarinia virginianiae Chokecherry Gall Midge
- Cystiphora sonchi
- Dasineura aceris Silver Maple
- Dasineura acrophila
- Dasineura auritae Willow
- Dasineura balsamicola Fir
- Dasineura brassicae Brassica Pod Midge
- Dasineura carbonaria grass-leaved goldenrod
- Dasineura communis the gouty vein midge, maples
- Dasineura crataegi Hawthorn Button-Top Gall-Midge
- Dasineura crataegibedeguar hawthorn
- Dasineura folliculi
- Dasineura fraxini
- Dasineura gleditchiae honeylocust podgall midge
- Dasineura investita Wood Nettle Gall Midge
- Dasineura pellex Ash Bullet Gall Midge
- Dasineura pilosa Canada nettle
- Dasineura urticae Nettle Pouch Gall Midge
- Harmandiola cavernosa poplar
- Harmandiola tremulae Aspen Leaf Gall Midge
- Harmandiola castaneae
- Harmandiola cavernosa poplar
- Harmandiola globuli poplar
- Harmandiola helena Poplar
- Horidiplosis ficifolii Indian laurel
- Iteomyia capreae Willow
- Iteomyia major
- Iteomyia Iteomyia salicisverruca Willow Leaf Gall Midge
- Janetiella ulmii Elm
- Kiefferia pericarpiicola
- Dasineura pudibunda Hornbeam Leaf Gall Midge
- Lasioptera cylindrigallae grass-leaved goldenrod
- Lasioptera ephedrae Mormon Tea Stem Gall Midge
- Lasioptera rubi Raspberry Gall Midge
- Lasioptera solidaginis Canadian goldenrod
- Macrodiplosis castaneae chestnut
- Macrodiplosis erubescens Marginal Leaf Fold Gall Midge
- Macrodiplosis majalis
- Macrodiplosis niveipila
- Macrodiplosis pustularis Oak
- Macrodiplosis roboris oak
- Macrodiplosis qoruca Oak Vein Pocket Gall
- Mikiola fagi Beech Gall Midge
- Neolasioptera ambrosiae ragweed
- Neolasioptera boehmeriae false nettle
- Neolasioptera convolvuli hedge bindweed
- Neolasioptera farinosa
- Neolasioptera impatienti
- Neolasioptera perfoliata Boneset Stem Midge
- Neolasioptera verbesinae
- Neolasioptera vitinea
- Obolodiplosis robiniae black locust
- Olpodiplosis helianthi Helianthus
- Paradiplosis tumifex Balsam Gall Midge
- Parallelodiplosis subtruncata Dogwood Eyespot Gall Midge
- Pinyonia edulicola Colorado pinyon pine
- Placochela nigripes honeysuckle, privet
- Polystepha globosa
- Polystepha pilulae Oak Leaf Gall Midge
- Polystepha quercifolia
- Prodiplosis falcata
- Prodiplosis floricola Clematis, Spiraea
- Rabdophaga rosaria Willow Rose Gall Midge
- Rabdophaga strobiloides Willow Pinecone Gall Midge
- Rabdophaga salicisbrassicoides Willow Rosette Gall Midge
- Rabdophaga rigidae Willow Beaked-Gall Midge
- Rhopalomyia capitata Giant Goldenrod Bunch Gall Midge
- Rhopalomyia californica Coyote Brush Bud Gall Midge
- Rhopalomyia floccosa Sagebrush Woolly Stem Gall Midge
- Resseliella globosa
- Resseliella liriodendri Tulip Tree Leaf Spot Gall Midge
- Rhopalomyia pomum Sponge Gall Midge
- Rhopalomyia solidaginis Goldenrod Bunch Gall
- Rondaniola bursaria Lighthouse Gall
- Sackenomyia commota Viburnum
- Sequoiomyia taxodii
- Schizomyia eupatoriflorae Boneset Flower Gall Midge
- Schizomyia impatientis Jewelweed Gall Midge
- Schizomyia racemicola
- Stephomyia eugeniae
- Taxodiomyia cupressiananassa Cypress Twig Gall Midge
- Thecodiplosis brachynteroides
- Vitisiella brevicauda Grape Tumid Gallmaker Midge
- Vitisiella vesicula

=== Tephritidae Fruit Flies ===
- Aciurina bigeloviae Cotton-gall Tephritid
- Aciurina thoracica Desert Broom Gallfly
- Aciurina trixa Bubble-gall Tephritid
- Cecidochares connexa Chromolaena Stem Gall Fly
- Eurosta comma goldenrod
- Eurosta cribrata goldenrod
- Eurosta floridensis Pine-barren Goldenrod fly
- Eurosta solidaginis goldenrod gall fly
- Eutreta novaeboracensis goldenrod root fly
- Procecidochares anthracina
- Procecidochares atra Goldenrod Brussels Sprout Gall Fly
- Procecidochares gibba ragweed
- Procecidochares kristineae Bud-gall Tephritid
- Procecidochares polita wand goldenrod
- Procecidochares utilis Crofton weed
- Tephritis bardanae Burdock Fly
- Tephritis neesii Oxeye Daisy Fly
- Tephritis pura goldenrod
- Urophora cardui Canada thistle gall fly
- Urophora jaceana Knapweed Gall-Fly
- Valentibulla californica gray rabbitbrush
- Valentibulla dodsoni gray rabbitbrush
- Xyphosia miliaria thistle

== Hemiptera ==
=== Adelgidae ===
- Adelges abietis - Pineapple gall adelgid
- Adelges cooleyi (pine)

=== Aphididae ===
- Cryptomyzus ribis Redcurrant Blister Aphid
- Cryptomyzus ribis currant
- Colopha ulmicola Elm Cockscomb Aphid
- Colopha compressa
- Cryptomyzus korschelti
- Dysaphis crataegi Hawthorn-Carrot Aphid
- Eriosoma americanum Woolly Elm Aphid
- Eriosoma ulmi Elm-Currant Aphid
- Hamamelistes spinosus birch
- Hormaphis cornu on birch
- Hormaphis hamamelidis Witch-Hazel Cone Gall Aphid
- Melaphis rhois Staghorn Sumac Aphid
- Mordwilkoja vagabunda eastern cottonwood
- Pachypappa pseudobyrsa poplars
- Pemphigus betae poplars
- Pemphigus bursarius black poplar
- Pemphigus obesinymphae poplars
- Pemphigus populicaulis poplars
- Pachypappa rosettei quaking aspen
- Pachypappa sacculi quaking aspen
- Pemphigus populicaulis poplars
- Pemphigus populitransversus Poplar Petiole Gall Aphid
- Pemphigus spyrothecae Poplar Spiral Gall Aphid
- Tamalia coweni Manzanita leaf gall aphid
- Tetraneura akinire Oriental Grass Root Aphid
- Tetraneura nigriabdominalis Elms
- Tetraneura ulmi Elm Sack Gall Aphid
- Hyadaphis tataricae Honeysuckle Aphid

=== Aphalaridae ===
- Pachypsylla celtidismamma - Hackberry Nipplegall Maker
- Pachypsylla celtidisasterisca - Hackberry Star Gall Psyllid
- Pachypsylla celtidisvesicula - Hackberry Blistergall Psyllid
- Pachypsylla venusta - Hackberry Petiole Gall Psylli

=== Coccidae (soft scale) ===
- Neopulvinaria innumerabilis
- Pulvinaria cockerelli (holly/Spiraea salicifolia)

=== Eriococcidae felt scales ===
- Cylindrococcus spiniferus - Casuarina Gall
- Apiomorpha duplex Two-tailed Gumtree Gall
- Apiomorpha munita Four-winged Gall

=== Phylloxeridae ===
- Daktulosphaira vitifoliae - Grape phylloxera

=== Psyllidae ===
- Baa antennata
- Gyropsylla ilecis
- Livia bifasciata (Canadian rush)
- Livia junci
- Livia maculipennis
- Psyllopsis fraxini - Ash Psyllid
- Psylla buxi - Boxwood Psyllid

=== Triozidae Jumping Plant Lice ===
- Bactericera albiventris
- Trioza adventicia lillipillies
- Trioza alacris - Bay Sucker
- Trioza aylmeriae Canadian serviceberry
- Trioza centranthi - Valerian Psyllid
- Trioza flavipennis
- Trioza magnoliae Swampbay
- Trioza remota

== Hymenoptera ==
=== Braconidae ===
- Allorhogas uberlandiensis

=== Cynipidae Gall wasps ===
- Acraspis erinacei Hedgehog Gall Wasp
- Acraspis pezomachoides
- Acraspis prinoides oaks
- Acraspis quercushirta Jewel Oak Gall Wasp
- Acraspis villosa
- Amphibolips acuminata oaks
- Amphibolips confluenta Spongy Oak Apple Gall Wasp
- Amphibolips cookii Oak Apple Gall Wasp
- Amphibolips nubilipennis Translucent Oak Gall Wasp
- Amphibolips quercusinanis Larger Empty Oak Apple Wasp
- Amphibolips quercusjuglans Acorn Plum Gall Wasp
- Amphibolips quercusostensackenii Small Oak Apple Gall Wasp
- Amphibolips quercuspomiformis Live Oak Apple Gall Wasp
- Amphibolips quercusracemaria
- Andricus aries Ram's Horn Gall Wasp
- Andricus californicus California gall wasp
- Andricus confertus Convoluted Gall Wasp
- Andricus corruptrix oaks
- Andricus crystallinus crystalline gall wasp
- Andricus dimorphus Clustered Midrib Gall Wasp
- Andricus foecundatrix oak artichoke gall
- Andricus kollari marble gall wasp
- Andricus foecundatrix oak artichoke gall
- Andricus gigas Saucer Gall Wasp
- Andricus kingi Red Cone Gall Wasp
- Andricus kollari marble gall wasp
- Andricus lignicola oaks
- Andricus parmula Disc Gall Wasp
- Andricus quercuscalicis knopper gall
- Andricus quercuscalifornicus California Gall Wasp
- Andricus quercusflocci
- Andricus quercusfrondosus Oak Rosette Gall Wasp
- Andricus quercuslanigera Wool-bearing Gall Wasp
- Andricus quercuspetiolicola Oak Petiole Gall Wasp
- Antistrophus chrysothamni yellow rabbitbrush
- Antistrophus laciniatus rosinweed
- Antistrophus minor compass plant
- Antistrophus microseris Microseris Stem Gall Wasp
- Antistrophus pisum skeletonweed
- Antistrophus silphii Apical Rosinweed Gall Wasp
- Antron plumbeum
- Aphelonyx cerricola
- Aphelonyx kordestanica oaks
- Atrusca aggregata oaks
- Atrusca brevipennata oaks
- Atrusca capronae turbinella oak
- Atrusca clavuloides Club Gall Wasp
- Atrusca quercuscentricola Spotted Oak Apple Gall Wasp
- Atrusca trimaculosa Woollybear Gall Wasp
- Atrusca unica oaks
- Aulacidea annulata Canada lettuce
- Aulacidea ambrosiaecola common ragweed
- Aulacidea hieracii Canadian hawkweed
- Aulacidea podagrae lettuce, wild
- Aulacidea subterminalis Hieracium Gall Wasp
- Aulacidea tumida lettuce, wild
- Bassettia flavipes bur oak
- Belonocnema fossoria
- Belonocnema kinseyi
- Belonocnema treatae
- Biorhiza pallida Oak Apple Gall Wasp
- Burnettweldia corallina Coral Gall Wasp
- Burnettweldia plumbella Beaked Twig Gall Wasp
- Burnettweldia washingtonen oaks
- Callirhytis furva Furry Oak Leaf Gall Wasp
- Callirhytis lanata Woolly Oak Gall Wasp
- Callirhytis quercuscornigera Horned Oak Gall Wasp
- Callirhytis quercusfutilis Oak Wart Gall Wasp
- Callirhytis quercussuttoni Gouty Stem Gall Wasp
- Callirhytis seminator Wool Sower .
- Coffeikokkos copeyensis
- Cynips conspicuus Fuzzy-Gall Wasp
- Cynips divisa Red-Pea Gall or Red Currant Gall
- Cynips douglasii Spined Turbaned Gall Wasp
- Cynips mirabilis Speckled Gall Wasp
- Cynips quercusechinus Urchin Gall Wasp
- Cynips quercusfolii Cherry Gall Wasp
- Diastrophus cuscutaeformis Blackberry Seed Gall Wasp
- Diastrophus kincaidii Thimbleberry Gallmaker
- Diastrophus nebulosus Blackberry Knot Gall Wasp
- Diastrophus rubi
- Diplolepis fructuum
- Diplolepis mayri
- Diplolepis polita Spiny Leaf Gall Wasp
- Diplolepis rosae Mossy Rose Gall
- Diplolepis spinosa rose
- Diplolepis nervosa Spiked Pea Gall Wasp
- Disholcaspis cinerosa Mealy Oak Gall Wasp
- Disholcaspis quercusglobulus Round Bullet Gall Wasp
- Druon quercuslanigerum Wool-bearing Gall Wasp
- Disholandricus chrysolepidis Muffin Gall Wasp
- Disholandricus lasius Hairy Gall Wasp
- Disholcaspis quercusmamma Oak Rough Bulletgall Wasp
- Disholcaspis eldoradensis
- Disholcaspis prehensa
- Druon fullawayi Yellow Wig Gall Wasp
- Druon ignotum
- Druon pattoni oaks
- Druon quercusflocci oaks
- Druon quercuslanigerum
- Dryocosmus dubiosus Two-horned Gall Wasp
- Dryocosmus imbricariae Banded Bullet Gall Wasp
- Dryocosmus jungalii
- Dryocosmus minusculus Pumpkin Gall Wasp
- Dryocosmus quercuspalustris Succulent Oak Gall Wasp
- Dryocosmus rileyi
- Heteroecus pacificus beaked spindle gall wasp
- Heteroecus sanctaeclarae Mushroom Gall Wasp
- Kokkocynips decidua Oak Wheat Gall
- Liposthenes glechomae Glechoma Gall Wasp
- Loxaulus virginianae oaks
- Neuroterus albipes Smooth Spangle Gall Wasp
- Neuroterus anthracinus Oyster Gall Wasp
- Neuroterus numismalis Silk-Button Spangle Gall Wasp
- Neuroterus quercusbatatus
- Neuroterus quercusbaccarum Common Spangle Gall Wasp
- Neuroterus quercusverrucarum Oak Flake Gall Wasp
- Neuroterus saltatorius Jumping Gall Wasp
- Neuroterus tantulus
- Paracraspis guadaloupensis Intermediate Oak Disc Wasp
- Paracraspis insolens canyon live oak
- Paracraspis patelloides Bowl Gall Wasp
- Philonix fulvicollis oaks
- Phylloteras cupella Urn Gall Wasp
- Phylloteras poculum oaks
- Phylloteras rubinum oaks
- Phylloteras volutellae Conical Oak Gall Wasp
- Pseudoneuroterus mazandarani
- Pseudoneuroterus nichollsi
- Striatoandricus aciculatus oaks
- Trichagalma formosana
- Trigonaspis fumosa oaks
- Trigonaspis polita oaks
- Xanthoteras clavuloides Club Gall Wasp
- Zapatella quercusphellos

=== Eulophidae ===
- Aprostocetus smilax
- Arastichus
- Dichatomus acerinus
- Leptocybe invasa
- Ophelimus bipolaris
- Ophelimus eucalypti
- Quadrastichus erythrinae

=== Eurytomidae ===
- Bruchophagus felis
- Tetramesa

=== Epichrysomallidae ===
- Josephiella microcarpae

=== Melanosomellidae ===
- Aditrochus coihuensis
- Perilampella hecataeus

=== Ormyridae ===
- Halleriaphagus phagolucida
- Hemadas nubilipennis

=== Tanaostigmatidae ===
- Tanaostigmodes howardii

=== Tenthredinidae ===
- Euura amerinae Bay willow
- Euura californica Willow Apple Gall Sawfly
- Euura crassipes downy willow
- Euura gracilis silky willow
- Euura proxima Willow Redgall Sawfly
- Euura pavida Lesser Willow Sawfly
- Phyllocolpa populi large-tooth aspen

== Lepidoptera Moths and Butterflies ==
=== Cosmopterigidae cosmet moths ===
- Periploca ceanothiella ceanothus stem gall moth
- Stagmatophora sexnotella dune blue curls
- Epiblema scudderiana goldenrod gall moth
- Epiblema rudei snakeweeds
- Epiblema strenuana ragweed borer

=== Elachistidae a Moth genus ===
- Blastodacna atra - Apple Pith Moth

=== Gelechiidae Twirler Moths ===
- Gnorimoschema baccharisella Coyote Brush Stem Gall Moth
- Gnorimoschema gallaesolidaginis Solidago Gall Moth
- Gnorimoschema gibsoniella stiff goldenrod
- Gnorimoschema jocelynae tall goldenrod
- Gnorimoschema octomaculella Rabbitbrush Stem Gall Moth
- Gnorimoschema salinaris goldenrods

=== Gracillariidae ===
- Borboryctis euryae on Eurya japonica
- Caloptilia augeas on Glochidion bilardierei
- Caloptilia cecidophora on Glochidion obovatum
- Caloptilia ceryneia on Glochidion bilardierei

=== Heliozelidae ===
- Heliozela sericiella Oak Satin Lift

=== Momphidae Mompha Moths ===
- Mompha bradleyi New Neat Cosmet
- Mompha divisella Neat Cosmet
- Mompha sturnipennella Kentish Cosmet
- Palaeomystella beckerii
- Palaeomystella chalcopeda
- Palaeomystella fernandesi
- Palaeomystella henriettiphila
- Palaeomystella oligophaga
- Palaeomystella rosaemariae
- Palaeomystella tavaresi
- Palaeomystella tibouchinae

=== Nepticulidae Midget Moths ===
- Ectoedemia populella Poplar petiole gall moth
- Stigmella gallicola

=== Sesiidae Clearwing moths ===
- Synanthedon flaviventris Sallow Clearwing
- Synanthedon formicaeformis Red-Tipped Clearwing

=== Tortricidae Tortrix Moths or Leafroller Moths ===
- Cydia millenniana Larch Gall Moth
- Cydia servillana Sallow-shoot Piercer

== Thysanoptera Thrips ==
=== Phlaeothripidae Tube-tailed Thrips ===
- Gynaikothrips ficorum Cuban laurel thrips
- Holopothrips tabebuiae trumpet tree
- Kladothrips ellobus Acacia trees
- Kladothrips hamiltoni Acacia trees
- Kladothrips rugosus Acacia trees
- Kladothrips waterhousei Acacia trees
- Oncothrips morrisi kleptoparasite
- Oncothrips rodwayi kleptoparasite
- Oncothrips tepperi kleptoparasite
- Teuchothrips disjunctus Bottlebrush thrips
