= Gall-inducing insect =

Insect causing the growth of galls within plants

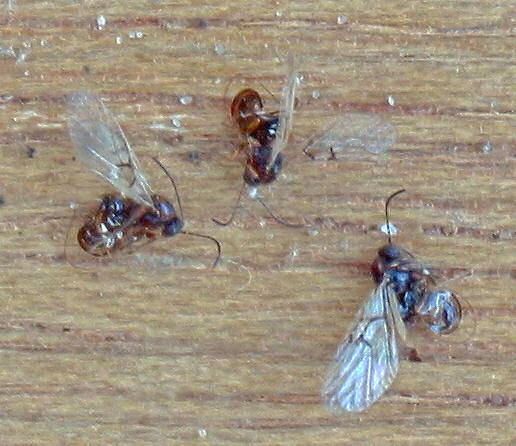
Parthenogenetic generation female gall wasps Neuroterus albipes, from galls on Quercus robur

A gall-inducing insect is any insect that can cause the growth of galls within plants. There are several groups of insects that meet this description. They include the gall wasps, scales, gall midges, aphids, psyllids and certain species of leafminer flies.

Galls are growth deformities induced in certain plants by various insects which are mostly species-specific. Galls induced by insects can be viewed as an extended phenotype of the inducing insect, and gall-inducing insects specialize on their host plants, often to a greater extent than insects that feed on the same plant without creating galls.

The gall's form or type depends on what organism is attacking the plant and where the plant is being attacked.

Based on the form, there are two classification systems used to identify the cause of galls: causative agents located outside plant tissues, and those agents located inside plant tissues.

Causative outside agents include:

- Krebs gall is caused by surface agents.
- Filz gall is caused by agents among surface hairs.
- Fold/roll gall is caused by agents within turned-over leaf blades.
- Pouch gall is caused by agents within a cup-like structure that occurs when opposite ends of the infected structure arch upward and form a spherical oval.

Causative inside agents include:

- Covering gall is caused by agents embedded within a gall when plant tissues rise up and surround the parasite.
- Lysenchyme gall is caused by agents that sink into the plant when the plant cells dissolve away and close around the parasite.
- Mark gall is caused by agents burrowing within plant tissue before gall develops.

This symbiotic relationship is rather one-sided, with not much research verifying any benefit given to the plant species; therefore such insects are most likely parasites of their host plant. The insect that causes the gall formation gets an entire microenvironment or microhabitat provided to it, safe from climate and predation, to grow within, and with a rich supply of food formed within the gall for the insect to feed upon. Ecologically, gall-inducing insects, because of their creation of a microhabitat, are often attacked by parasitoid or inquiline insects that take advantage of the excess resources the gall-inducer causes the plant to create, often leading to more biodiversity in the ecosystem than what would exist without the presence of gall-inducers. Thus gall-inducing insects are examples of ecosystem engineers.

== See also ==
- List of insect galls

== Sources ==
- Darlington, Arnold (1975) The Pocket Encyclopaedia of Plant Galls in Colour. Poole: Blandford Press. ISBN 0-7137-0748-8.
