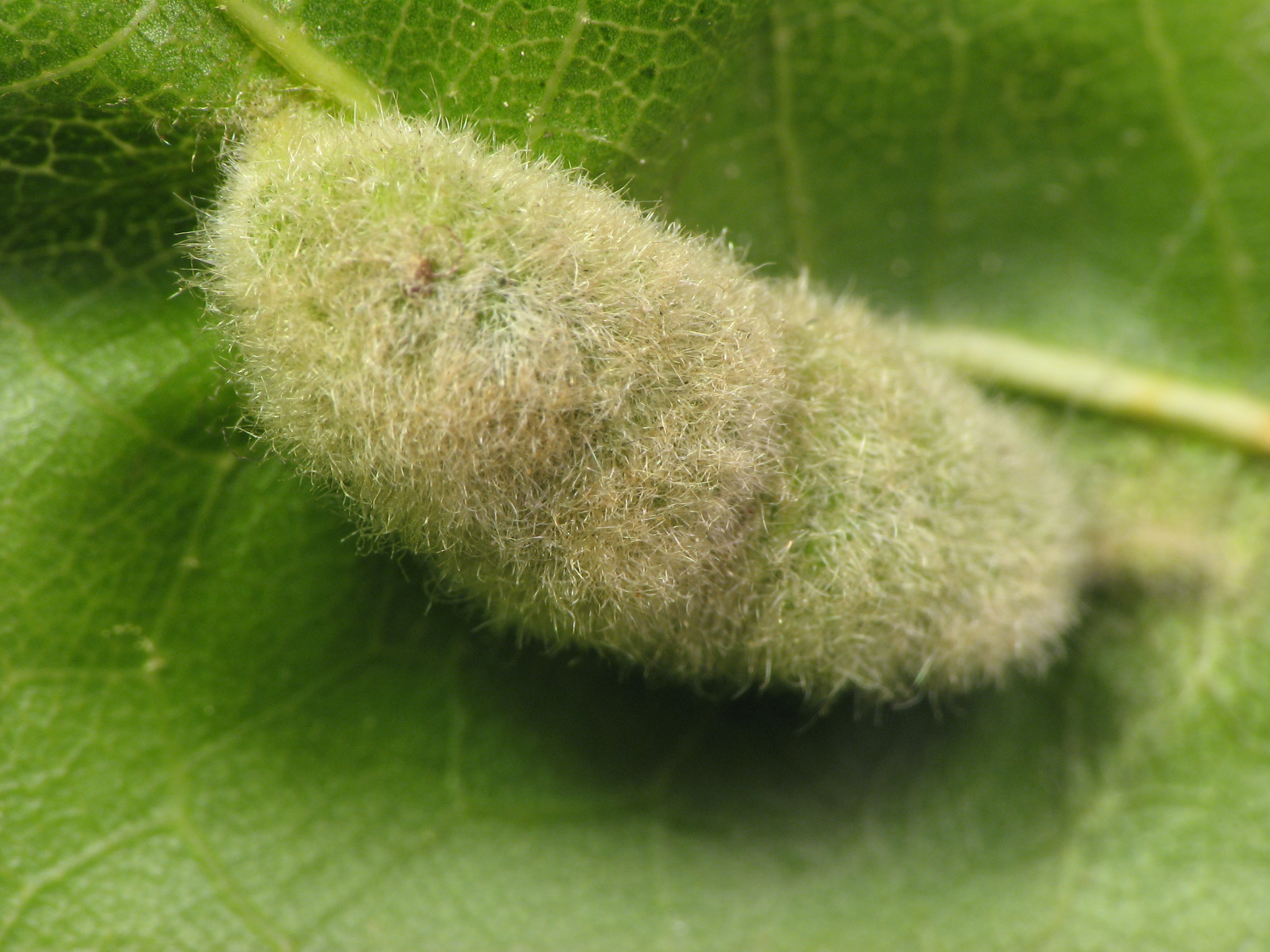
- Macrodiplosis niveipila gall, red oak

Scientific classification
- Domain: Eukaryota
- Kingdom: Animalia
- Phylum: Arthropoda
- Class: Insecta
- Order: Diptera
- Family: Cecidomyiidae
- Supertribe: Cecidomyiidi
- Genus: Macrodiplosis; Kieffer, 1895

= Macrodiplosis =

Genus of flies

Macrodiplosis is a genus of gall midges, insects in the family Cecidomyiidae. There are about 19 described species in Macrodiplosis.

== Species ==
These 19 species belong to the genus Macrodiplosis:

- Macrodiplosis antennata (Felt, 1908)^{i c g}
- Macrodiplosis castaneae (Stebbins, 1910)^{i b}
- Macrodiplosis claytoniae (Felt, 1907)^{i c g}
- Macrodiplosis dryobia (Low, 1877)^{c g}
- Macrodiplosis electra (Felt, 1908)^{i c g}
- Macrodiplosis erubescens (Osten Sacken, 1862)^{i c g b}
- Macrodiplosis flavoscuta (Felt, 1907)^{i c g}
- Macrodiplosis flexa Kovalev, 1972^{c g}
- Macrodiplosis inflexa (Bremi, 1847)^{g}
- Macrodiplosis majalis (Osten Sacken, 1878)^{i c g b}
- Macrodiplosis niveipila (Osten Sacken, 1862)^{i c g b}
- Macrodiplosis pustularis (Bremi, 1847)^{g}
- Macrodiplosis putrida (Felt, 1912)^{i c g}
- Macrodiplosis qoruca (Felt, 1925)^{i b}
- Macrodiplosis q-oruca (Felt, 1925)^{c g}
- Macrodiplosis roboris Kieffer, 1895^{c g}
- Macrodiplosis selenis Kim & Yukawa^{g}
- Macrodiplosis venae (Felt, 1914)^{c g}
- Macrodiplosis visvanathi (Rao, 1952)^{c g}

Data sources: i = ITIS, c = Catalogue of Life, g = GBIF, b = Bugguide.net
