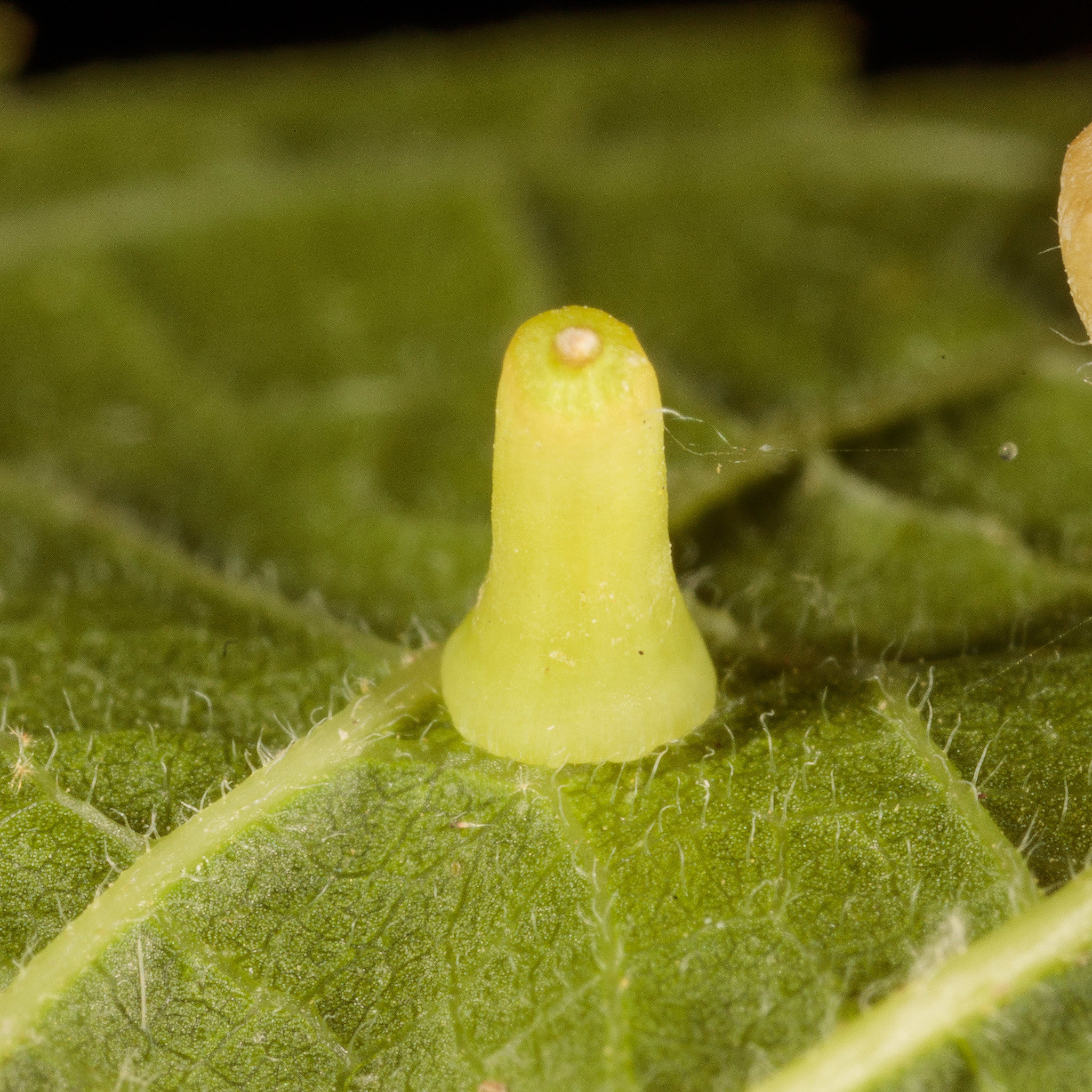
- Hackberry aciculate gall

Scientific classification
- Domain: Eukaryota
- Kingdom: Animalia
- Phylum: Arthropoda
- Class: Insecta
- Order: Diptera
- Family: Cecidomyiidae
- Subfamily: Cecidomyiinae
- Supertribe: Lasiopteridi
- Genus: Celticecis; Gagné, 1983

= Celticecis =

Genus of flies

Celticecis is a genus of hackberry gall midges in the family Cecidomyiidae.

== Species ==
The following species are recognised in the genus Celticecis:

- Celticecis aciculata Gagné, 2013 - hackberry aciculate gall midge
- Celticecis acuminata Gagné, 2013
- Celticecis capsularis (Patton, 1897) - hackberry rosette gall midge
- Celticecis caucasicae Gagné, 2013
- Celticecis celtiphyllia (Felt, 1908) - hackberry acorn gall midge
- Celticecis conica Gagné, 2013
- Celticecis connata Gagné, 2013 - hackberry aggregate gall midge
- Celticecis cornuata Gagné, 2013 - hackberry horn gall midge
- Celticecis cupiformis Gagné, 2013
- Celticecis expulsa Gagné, 2013
- Celticecis globosa Gagné, 2013 - hackberry globular leaf gall midge
- Celticecis japonica Yukawa & Tsuda, 1987
- Celticecis ovata Gagné, 2013 - hackberry tenpin gall midge
- Celticecis oviformis (Patton, 1897) - hackberry spherical stem gall midge
- Celticecis pilosa Gagné, 2013
- Celticecis pubescens (Patton, 1897) - hackberry pubescent gall midge
- Celticecis pyriformis Gagné, 2013 - hackberry pear-shaped gall midge
- Celticecis ramicola Gagné, 2013
- Celticecis semenrumicis (Patton, 1897)
- Celticecis spiniformis (Patton, 1897) - hackberry thorn gall midge
- Celticecis subulata Gagné, 2013 - hackberry awl-shaped gall midge
- Celticecis supina Gagné, 2013
- Celticecis unguicula (Beutenmuller, 1907)
- Celticecis wellsi (Felt, 1916)
