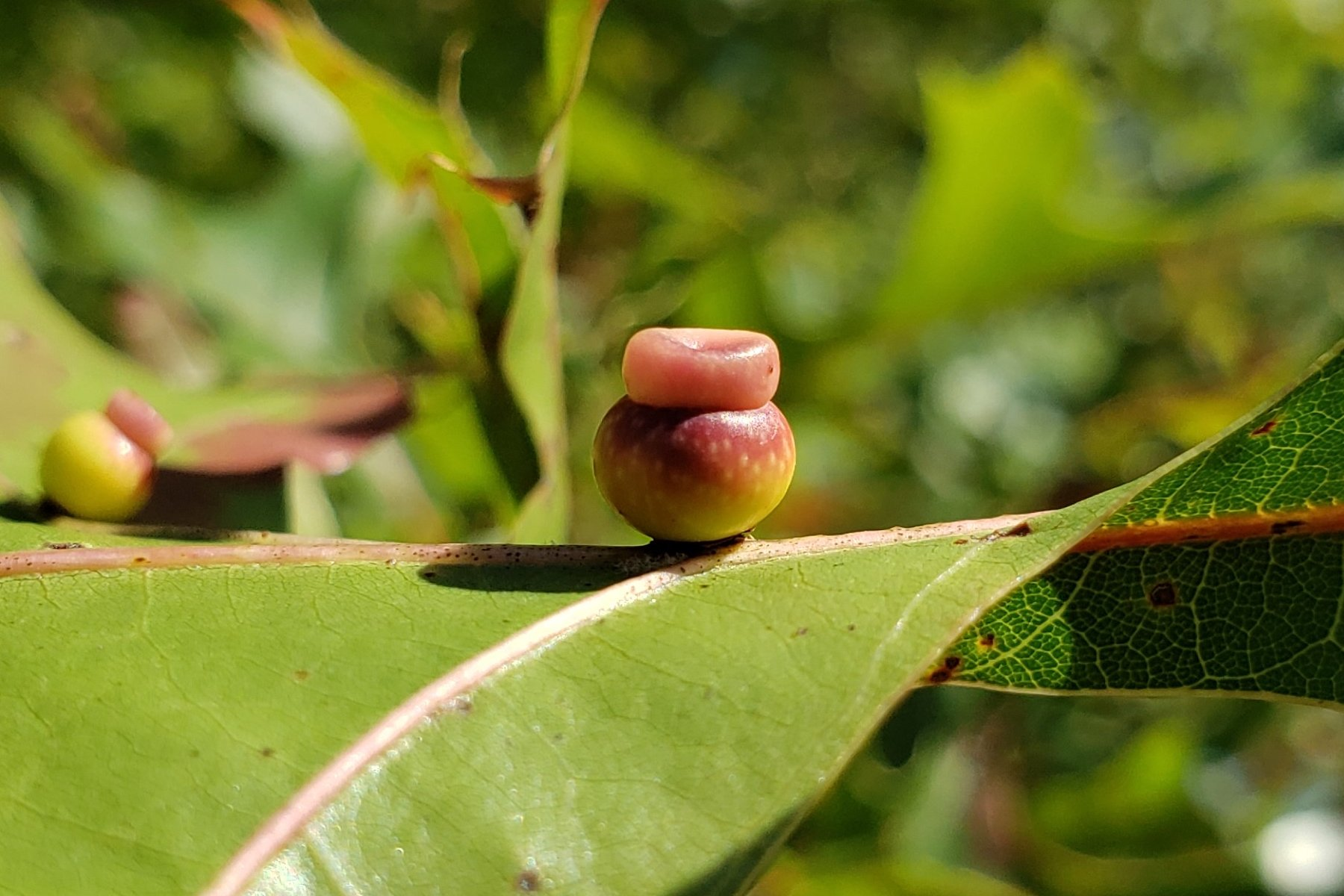
- Gall made by Kokkocynips rileyi on oak leaf

Scientific classification
- Kingdom: Animalia
- Phylum: Arthropoda
- Clade: Pancrustacea
- Class: Insecta
- Order: Hymenoptera
- Family: Cynipidae
- Tribe: Cynipini
- Genus: Kokkocynips; Pujade-Villar & Melika, 2013

Type species
- Kokkocynips doctorrosae Pujade-Villar, 2013

= Kokkocynips =

Genus of wasps

Kokkocynips is an American genus of gall wasps in the family Cynipidae. There are about 8 described species in the genus Kokkocynips with several others still undescribed.

== Species ==
Six species of Kokkocynips were transferred from the genus Dryocosmus.

The following species belong to the genus Kokkocynips:

- Kokkocynips attractans (Kinsey, 1922)
- Kokkocynips coxii (Bassett, 1881)
- Kokkocynips decidua (Beutenmueller, 1913)
- Kokkocynips difficilis (Ashmead, 1887)
- Kokkocynips doctorrosae Pujade-Villar, 2013
- Kokkocynips imbricariae (Ashmead, 1896)
- Kokkocynips rileyi (Ashmead, 1896)
- Kokkocynips panamensis Medianero & Nieves-Aldrey, 2021
