= Resseliella californica =

Scientific classification
- Domain: Eukaryota
- Kingdom: Animalia
- Phylum: Arthropoda
- Class: Insecta
- Order: Diptera
- Family: Cecidomyiidae
- Supertribe: Cecidomyiidi
- Genus: Resseliella
- Species: R. californica

Binomial name
- Resseliella californica (Felt, 1914)

Synonyms
- Thomasia californica Felt, 1914

Species of fly

Resseliella californica is a species of gall midges in the family Cecidomyiidae.
