= Soybean gall midge =

Scientific classification
- Kingdom: Animalia
- Phylum: Arthropoda
- Class: Insecta
- Order: Diptera
- Family: Cecidomyiidae
- Genus: Resseliella
- Species: R. maxima

Binomial name
- Resseliella maxima Gagné, 2019

Species of insect

The soybean gall midge (Resseliella maxima) is a midge species that attacks soybean in the Upper Midwest of the United States. The species was first identified in 2018, and has since been found in Iowa, Missouri, Nebraska, and Minnesota. Adults lay eggs at the base of plant stems, and orange larvae can cause plants to die due to feeding damage and girdling. Yield losses in heavily infested fields may reach up to 100%.
