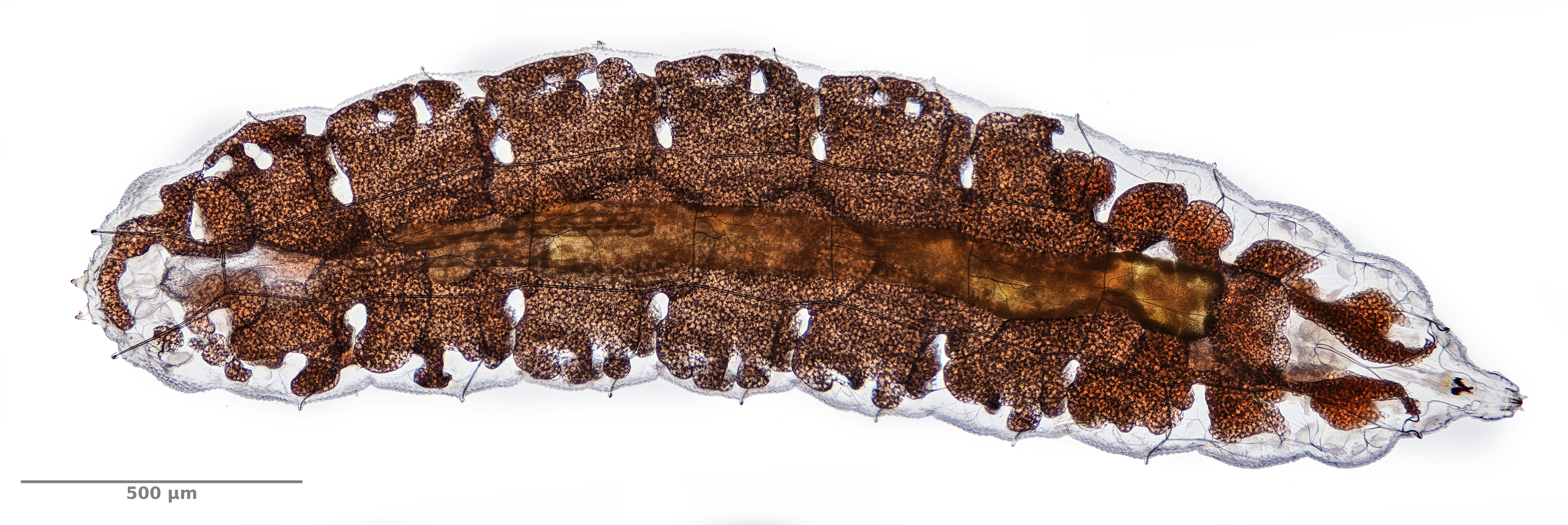
- Resseliella lavandulae larva

Scientific classification
- Domain: Eukaryota
- Kingdom: Animalia
- Phylum: Arthropoda
- Class: Insecta
- Order: Diptera
- Family: Cecidomyiidae
- Subfamily: Cecidomyiinae
- Supertribe: Cecidomyiidi
- Genus: Resseliella; Seitner, 1906

= Resseliella =

Genus of flies

Resseliella is a genus of gall midges in the family Cecidomyiidae. There are at least 50 described species in the genus Resseliella.

== Species ==
These 50 species belong to the genus Resseliella:

- Resseliella aurata (Felt, 1908)^{i c g}
- Resseliella betulicola (Kieffer, 1889)^{c g}
- Resseliella californica (Felt, 1914)^{i c g b}
- Resseliella carnea (Kieffer, 1924)^{c g}
- Resseliella cincta (Felt, 1918)^{i c g}
- Resseliella cinctella (Kieffer, 1913)^{i c g}
- Resseliella clavula (Beutenmuller, 1892)^{i c g b} (dogwood club gall midge)
- Resseliella conicola (Foote, 1956)^{i c g}
- Resseliella coryli (Felt, 1907)^{i c g}
- Resseliella coryloides (Foote, 1956)^{i c g}
- Resseliella crassa (Möhn, 1955)^{c g}
- Resseliella crataegi (Barnes, 1939)^{c g}
- Resseliella dizygomyzae (Barnes, 1933)^{c g}
- Resseliella emblicae Chandra, 1991^{c g}
- Resseliella fruticosi (Pitcher, 1955)^{c g}
- Resseliella galegae (Neacs(with line beneath)u, 1971)^{c g}
- Resseliella hudsoni (Felt, 1907)^{i c g}
- Resseliella ingrica (Mamaev, 1971)^{c g}
- Resseliella lavandulae (Barnes, 1953)^{c g}
- Resseliella liriodendri (Osten Sacken, 1862)^{i c g b}
- Resseliella maccus (Loew, 1862)^{i c g}
- Resseliella maxima Gagné, 2019
- Resseliella meridionalis (Mamaev, 1965)^{c g}
- Resseliella oculiperda (Rübsaamen, 1893)^{c g}
- Resseliella odai (Inouye, 1955)^{c g}
- Resseliella oleisuga (Targioni-Tozzetti, 1887)^{c g}
- Resseliella orientalis (Felt, 1918)^{c}
- Resseliella perplexa (Felt, 1908)^{i c g}
- Resseliella piceae Seitner, 1906^{c g}
- Resseliella pinifoliae (Felt, 1936)^{i c g}
- Resseliella poecilantha Fedotova & Sidorenko, 2004^{c g}
- Resseliella proteae Gagne, 1983^{c g}
- Resseliella quadrifasciata (Niwa, 1910)^{c g}
- Resseliella quercivora (Mamaev, 1965)^{c g}
- Resseliella radicis (Felt, 1936)^{i c g}
- Resseliella ranunculi (Kieffer, 1909)^{c g}
- Resseliella resinicola Sanui & Yukawa, 1985^{c g}
- Resseliella resinophaga (Mamaev, 1971)^{c g}
- Resseliella ribis (Marikovskij, 1956)^{c g}
- Resseliella salicicola Fedotova, 2003^{c g}
- Resseliella salvadorae Rao, 1951^{c g}
- Resseliella sibirica (Mamaev, 1971)^{c g}
- Resseliella silvana (Felt, 1908)^{i c g}
- Resseliella skuhravyorum Skrzypczynska, 1975^{c g}
- Resseliella soya (Monzen, 1936)^{c g}
- Resseliella syringogenea (Hering, 1943)^{c g}
- Resseliella tenuis (Loew, 1850)^{c g}
- Resseliella theobaldi (Barnes, 1927)^{c g}
- Resseliella trianguliceps (Debski, 1918)^{c g}
- Resseliella tulipiferae (Osten Sacken, 1862)^{i c g}
- Resseliella vespicoloris (Barnes, 1933)^{c g}

Data sources: i = ITIS, c = Catalogue of Life, g = GBIF, b = Bugguide.net
