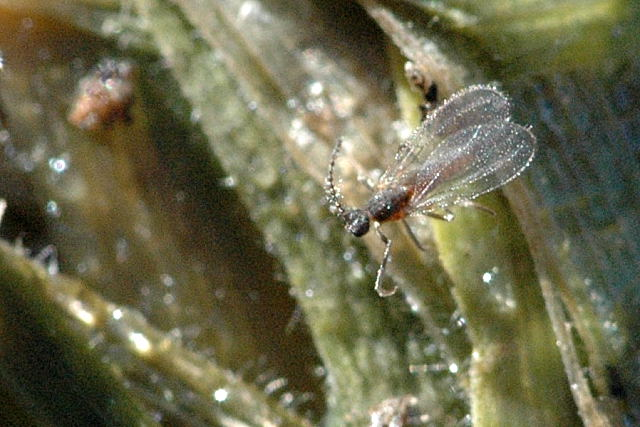
- Harmandiola tremulae

Scientific classification
- Domain: Eukaryota
- Kingdom: Animalia
- Phylum: Arthropoda
- Class: Insecta
- Order: Diptera
- Family: Cecidomyiidae
- Supertribe: Cecidomyiidi
- Genus: Harmandiola; Skuhravá, 1997

Type species
- Harmandiola tremulae (Winnertz, 1853)

= Harmandiola =

Genus of flies

Harmandiola is a genus of flies belonging to the family Cecidomyiidae. The 14 described species are found in the Holarctic region. They induce galls on species of poplar, chestnut, and hickory trees.

== Species ==
- Harmandiola amisae (Gagne, 1992)
- Harmandiola castaneae (Stebbins, 1910)
- Harmandiola cavernosa (Rübsaamen, 1899)
- Harmandiola globuli (Rübsaamen, 1889)
- Harmandiola helena (Felt, 1912)
- Harmandiola hudsoni (Felt, 1907)
- Harmandiola nucicola (Osten Sacken, 1878)
- Harmandiola polymorpha (Bremi, 1847)
- Harmandiola populea (Schrank, 1803)
- Harmandiola populi (Rübsaamen, 1917)
- Harmandiola pustulans (Kieffer, 1909)
- Harmandiola reginae (Felt, 1921)
- Harmandiola stebbinsae (Gagné, 1972)
- Harmandiola tremulae (Winnertz, 1853)
