= Polystepha =

Scientific classification
- Domain: Eukaryota
- Kingdom: Animalia
- Phylum: Arthropoda
- Class: Insecta
- Order: Diptera
- Family: Cecidomyiidae
- Subfamily: Cecidomyiinae
- Supertribe: Asphondyliidi
- Tribe: Asphondyliini
- Genus: Polystepha; Kieffer, 1897

Genus of flies

Polystepha is a genus of gall midges in the family Cecidomyiidae. There are more than 20 described species in Polystepha.

== Species ==
These 24 species belong to the genus Polystepha:

- Polystepha aceris (Felt, 1907)
- Polystepha americana (Felt, 1908)
- Polystepha canadensis (Felt, 1908)
- Polystepha caryae (Felt, 1908)
- Polystepha connecta (Felt, 1908)
- Polystepha cornifolia (Felt, 1907)
- Polystepha globosa (Felt, 1909)
- Polystepha lapalmae Möhn, 1960
- Polystepha malpighii (Kieffer, 1909)
- Polystepha multifila (Felt, 1907)
- Polystepha pilulae (Beutenmuller, 1892)
- Polystepha podagrae (Felt, 1909)
- Polystepha pustulata (Felt, 1909)
- Polystepha pustuloides (Beutenmuller, 1907)
- Polystepha quercifolia (Felt, 1908)
- Polystepha quercus Kieffer, 1897
- Polystepha rhoina (Felt, 1907)
- Polystepha rossica Mamaeva, 1981
- Polystepha salvadorensis Möhn, 1960
- Polystepha serrata (Felt, 1908)
- Polystepha simpla (Felt, 1909)
- Polystepha sobrina (Felt, 1907)
- Polystepha symmetrica (Osten Sacken, 1862)
- Polystepha transversa (Felt, 1907)
