= Stephomyia =

Scientific classification
- Domain: Eukaryota
- Kingdom: Animalia
- Phylum: Arthropoda
- Class: Insecta
- Order: Diptera
- Family: Cecidomyiidae
- Tribe: Asphondyliini
- Genus: Stephomyia; Tavares, 1916

Genus of flies

Stephomyia is a genus of gall midges in the family Cecidomyiidae. There are about seven described species in Stephomyia.

== Species ==
These seven species belong to the genus Stephomyia:

- Stephomyia clavata (Tavares, 1920)
- Stephomyia epeugenia Gagne, 1994
- Stephomyia espiralis Maia, 1993
- Stephomyia eugeniae (Felt, 1913)
- Stephomyia mina Maia, 1993
- Stephomyia rotundifoliorum Maia, 1993
- Stephomyia tetralobae Maia, 1993
