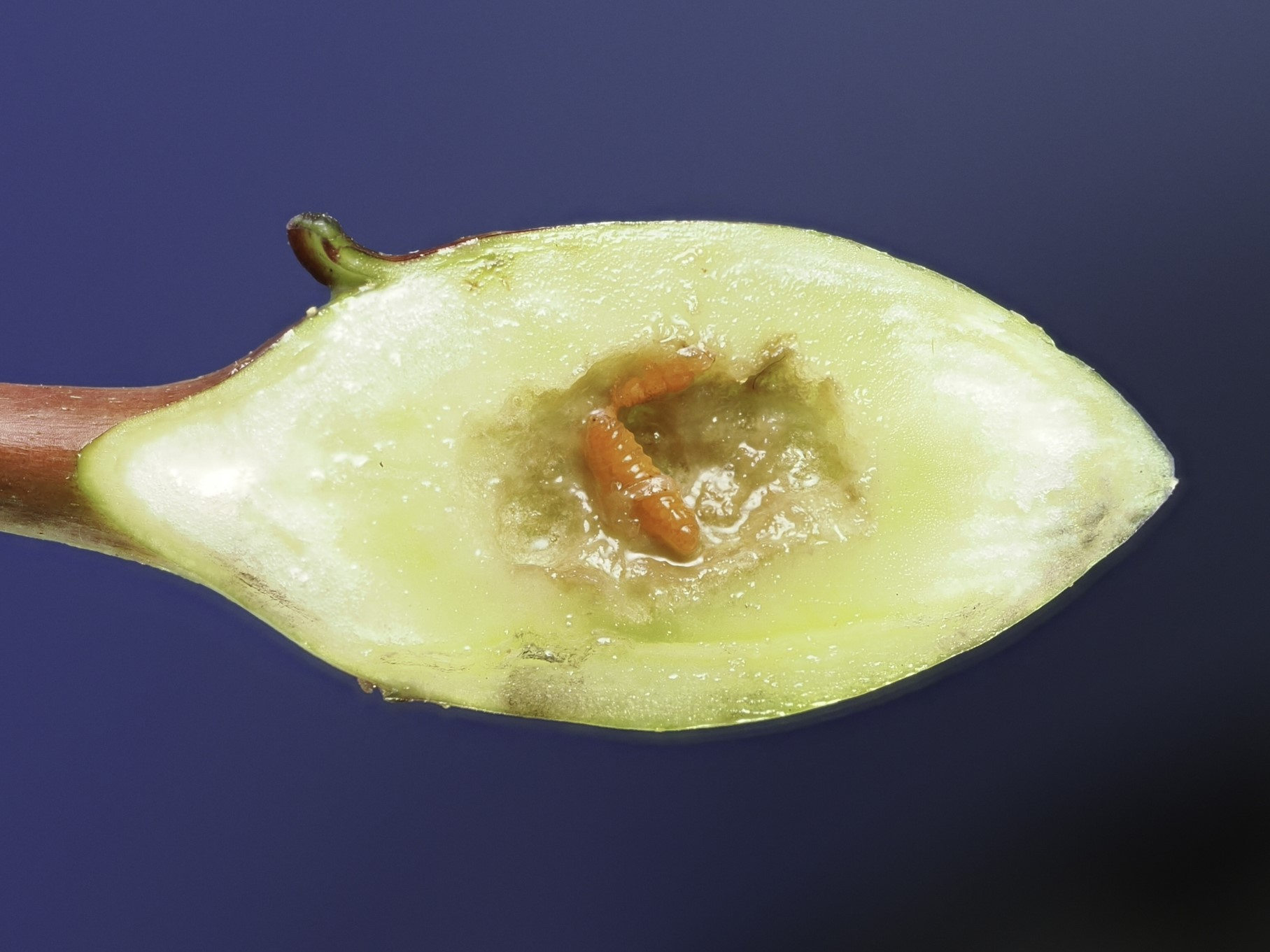

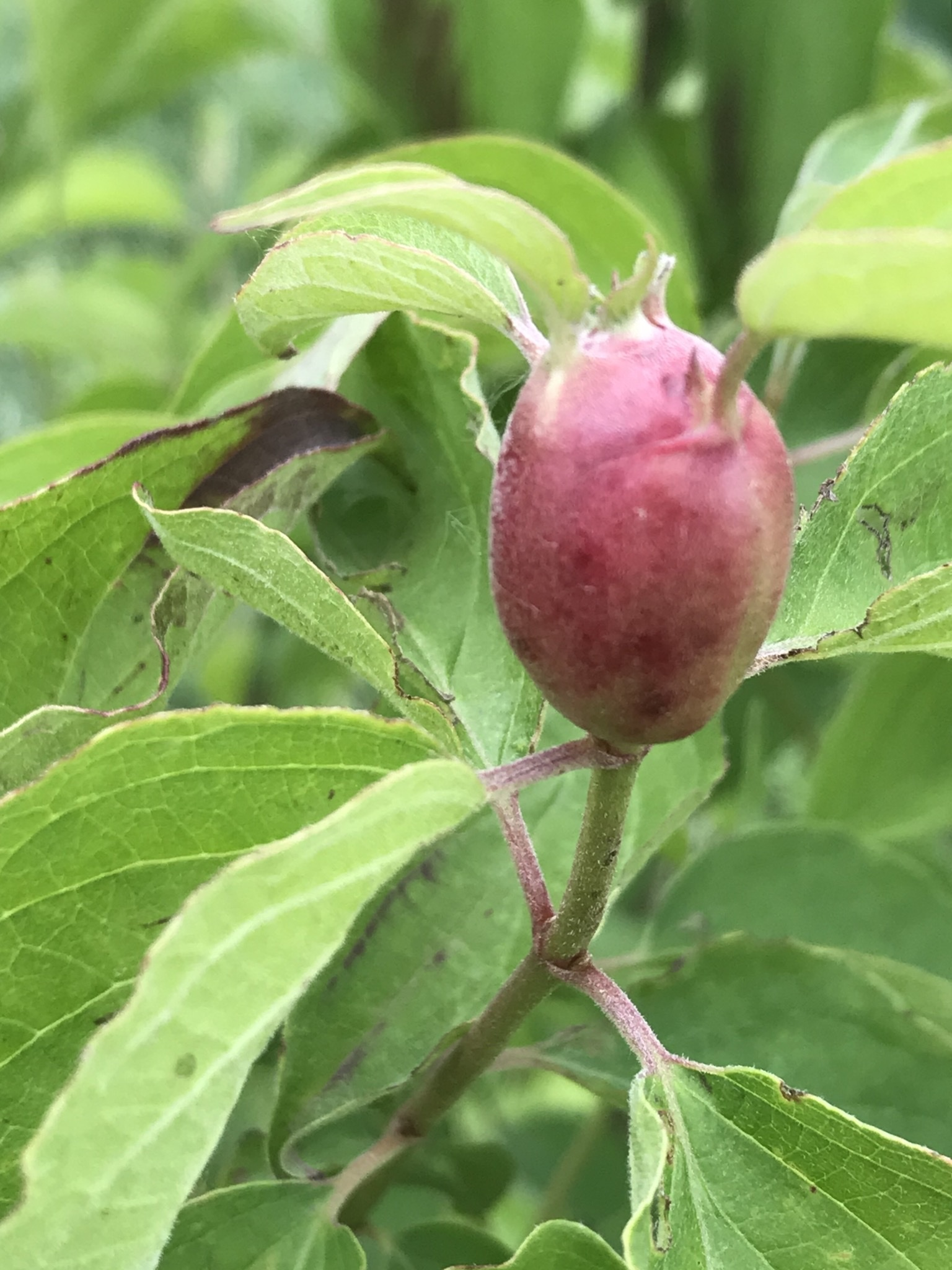
- Larva in cut-open gall (top) and stem gall (bottom)

Scientific classification
- Domain: Eukaryota
- Kingdom: Animalia
- Phylum: Arthropoda
- Class: Insecta
- Order: Diptera
- Family: Cecidomyiidae
- Supertribe: Cecidomyiidi
- Genus: Resseliella
- Species: R. clavula

Binomial name
- Resseliella clavula (Beutenmuller, 1892)

Synonyms
- Cecidomyia clavula Beutenmuller, 1892; Mycodiplosis alternata Felt, 1907

= Resseliella clavula =

Species of fly

Resseliella clavula, the dogwood club gall midge, is a species of gall midges in the family Cecidomyiidae.
