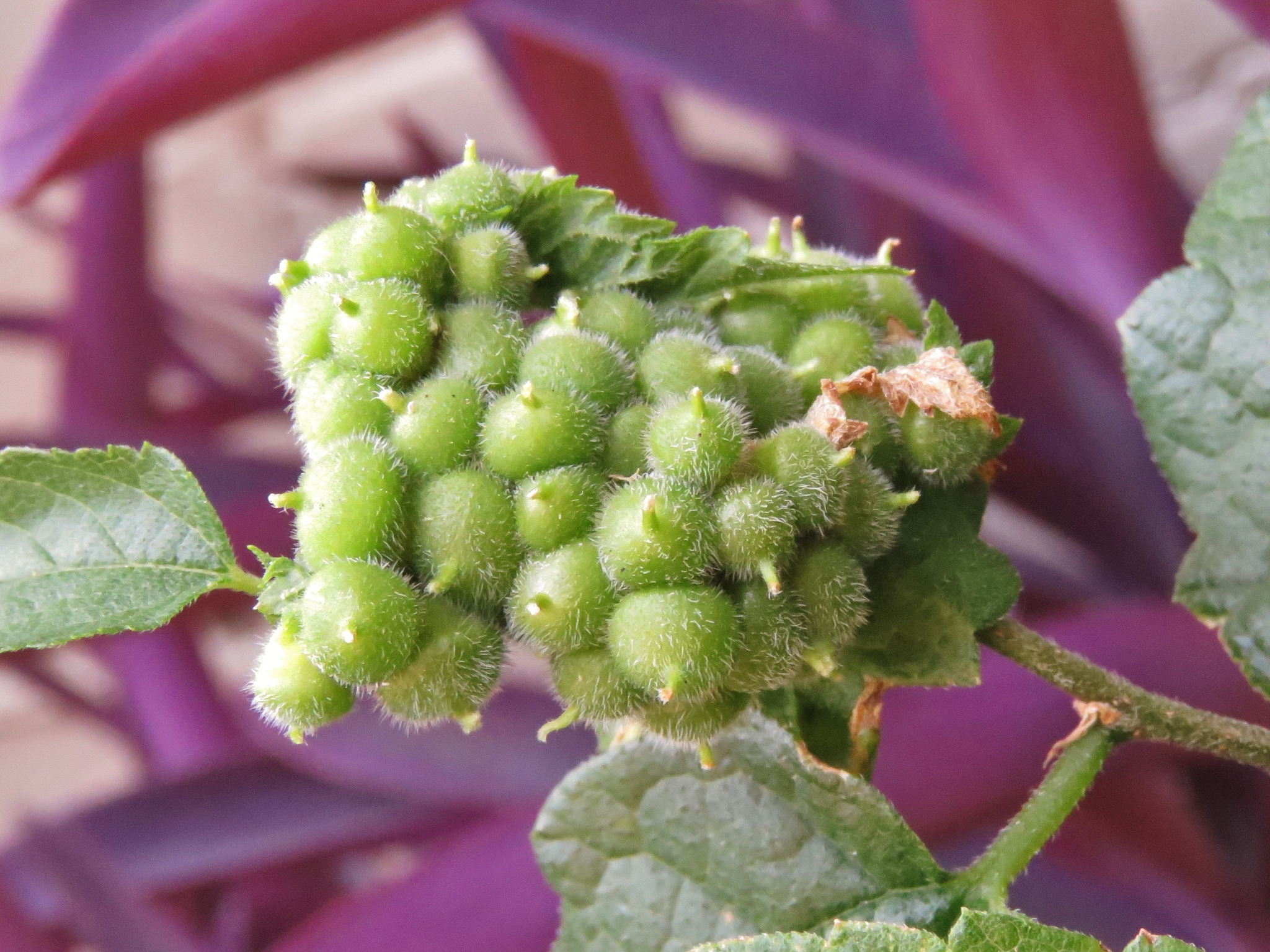

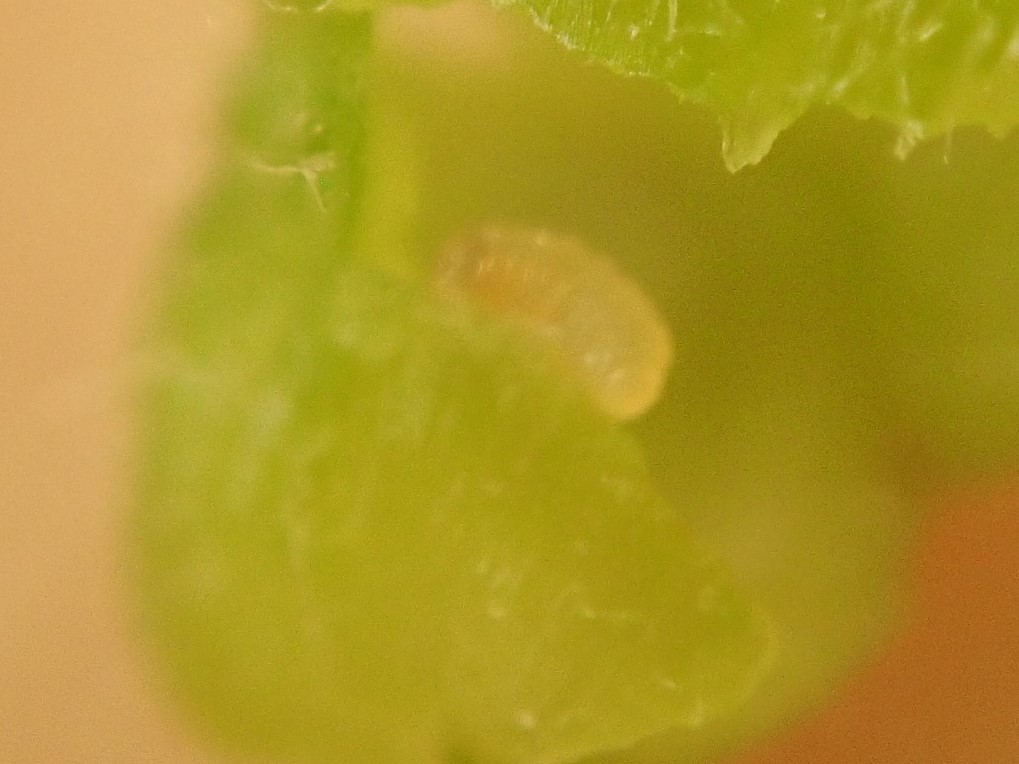
- Hackberry acorn galls (top) and larva (bottom)

Scientific classification
- Domain: Eukaryota
- Kingdom: Animalia
- Phylum: Arthropoda
- Class: Insecta
- Order: Diptera
- Family: Cecidomyiidae
- Genus: Celticecis
- Species: C. celtiphyllia

Binomial name
- Celticecis celtiphyllia (Felt, 1908)

Synonyms
- Mayetiola celtiphyllia Felt, 1908

= Celticecis celtiphyllia =

Species of fly

Celticecis celtiphyllia, the hackberry acorn gall midge, is a species of gall midges in the family Cecidomyiidae.
