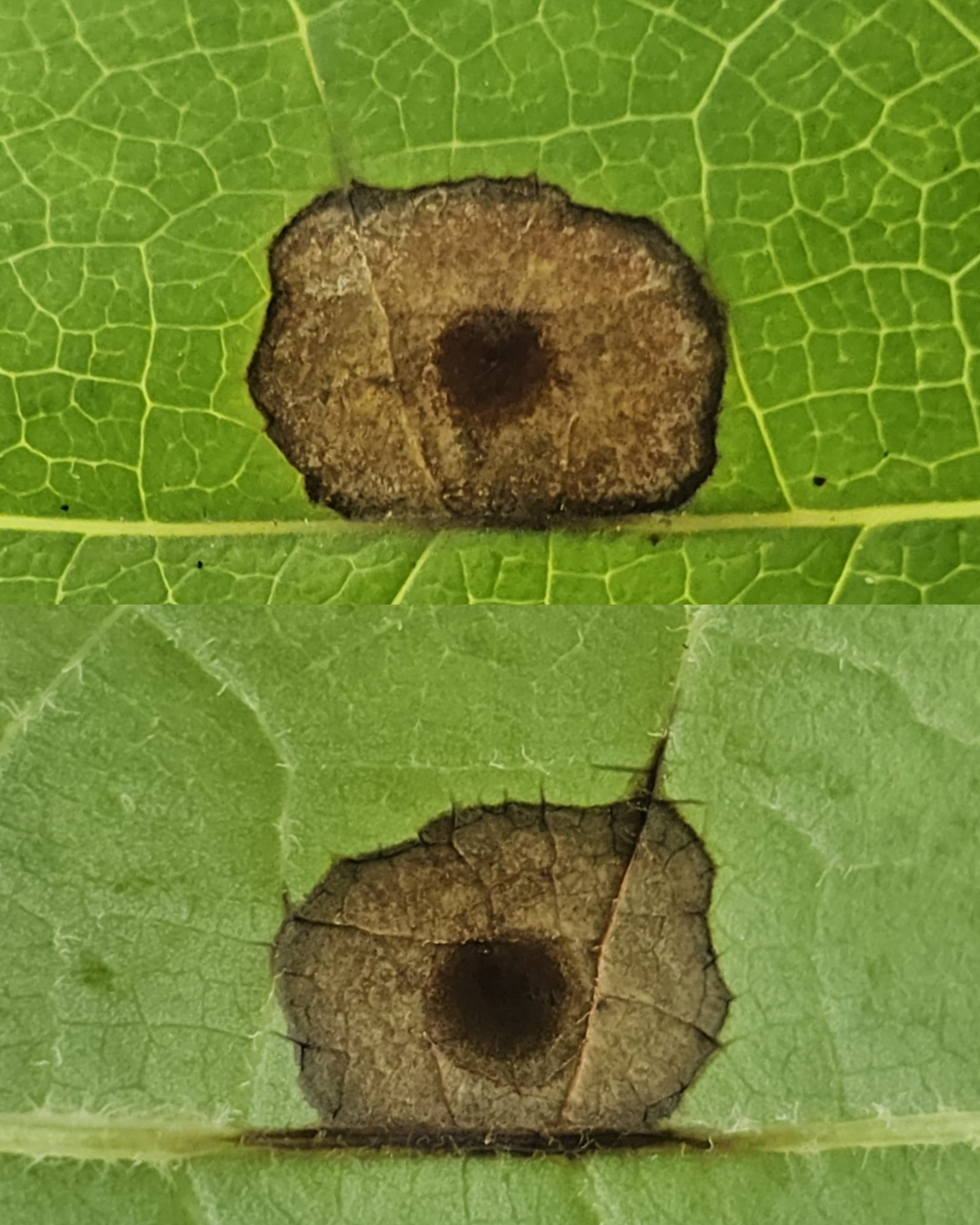

Scientific classification
- Kingdom: Animalia
- Phylum: Arthropoda
- Class: Insecta
- Order: Diptera
- Family: Cecidomyiidae
- Supertribe: Cecidomyiidi
- Genus: Resseliella
- Species: R. liriodendri

Binomial name
- Resseliella liriodendri (Osten Sacken, 1862)

Synonyms
- Cecidomyia liriodendri Osten Sacken, 1862

= Resseliella liriodendri =

Species of fly

Resseliella liriodendri is a species of gall midges in the family Cecidomyiidae.
