= Stephomyia eugeniae =

Scientific classification
- Domain: Eukaryota
- Kingdom: Animalia
- Phylum: Arthropoda
- Class: Insecta
- Order: Diptera
- Family: Cecidomyiidae
- Genus: Stephomyia
- Species: S. eugeniae

Binomial name
- Stephomyia eugeniae (Felt, 1913)

Synonyms
- Cystodiplosis eugeniae Felt, 1913

Species of fly

Stephomyia eugeniae is a species of gall midges in the family Cecidomyiidae.
