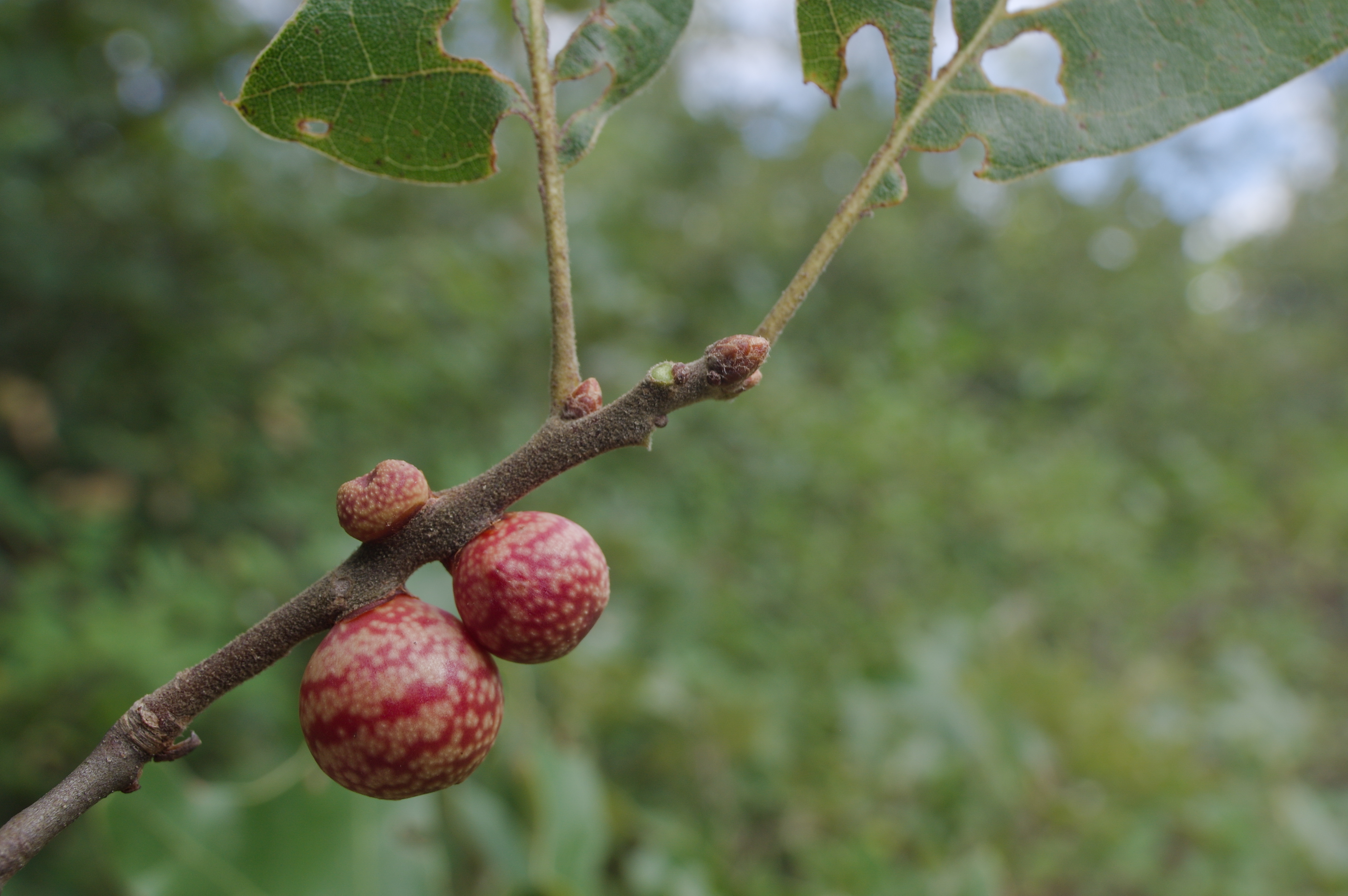
- Galls caused by Kokkocynips imbricariae larvae

Scientific classification
- Kingdom: Animalia
- Phylum: Arthropoda
- Class: Insecta
- Order: Hymenoptera
- Family: Cynipidae
- Genus: Kokkocynips
- Species: K. imbricariae

Binomial name
- Kokkocynips imbricariae (Ashmead, 1896)

Synonyms
- Kokkocynips imbricariae (Ashmead, 1896)

= Dryocosmus imbricariae =

Species of wasp

Kokkocynips imbricariae, the banded bullet gall wasp, is a species of gall wasp in the family Cynipidae.
