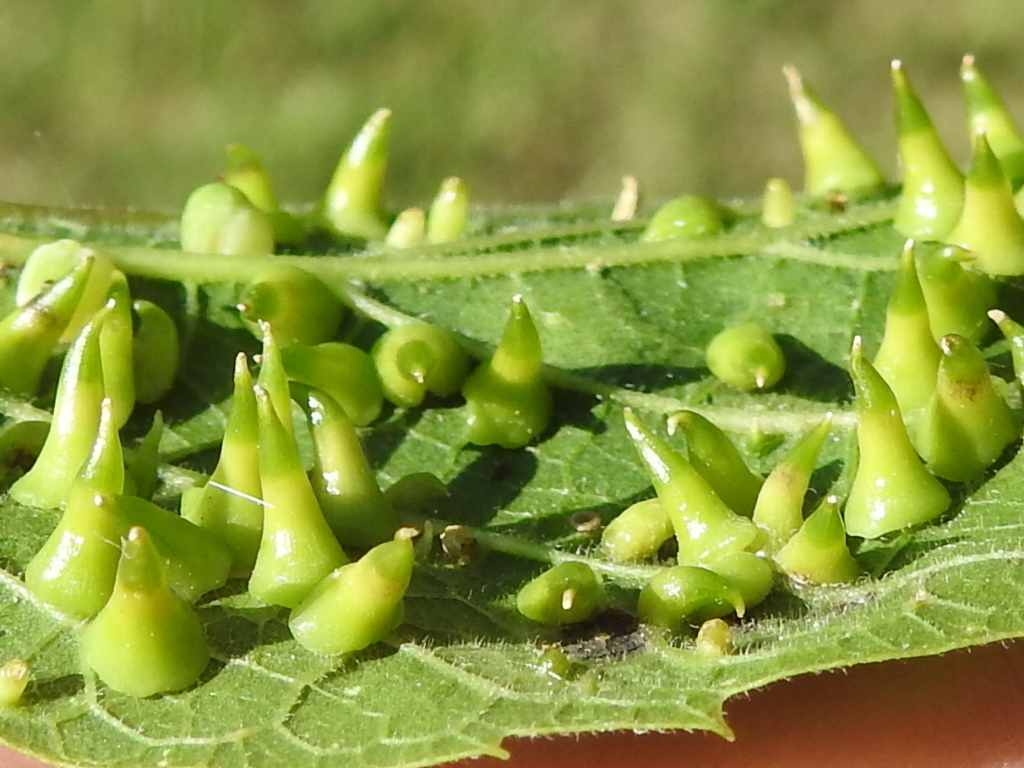
- Hackberry thorn galls

Scientific classification
- Domain: Eukaryota
- Kingdom: Animalia
- Phylum: Arthropoda
- Class: Insecta
- Order: Diptera
- Family: Cecidomyiidae
- Genus: Celticecis
- Species: C. spiniformis

Binomial name
- Celticecis spiniformis (Patton, 1897)

Synonyms
- Cecidomyiaceltis spiniformis Patton, 1897

= Celticecis spiniformis =

Species of fly

Celticecis spiniformis, the hackberry thorn gall midge, is a species of gall midges in the family Cecidomyiidae.
