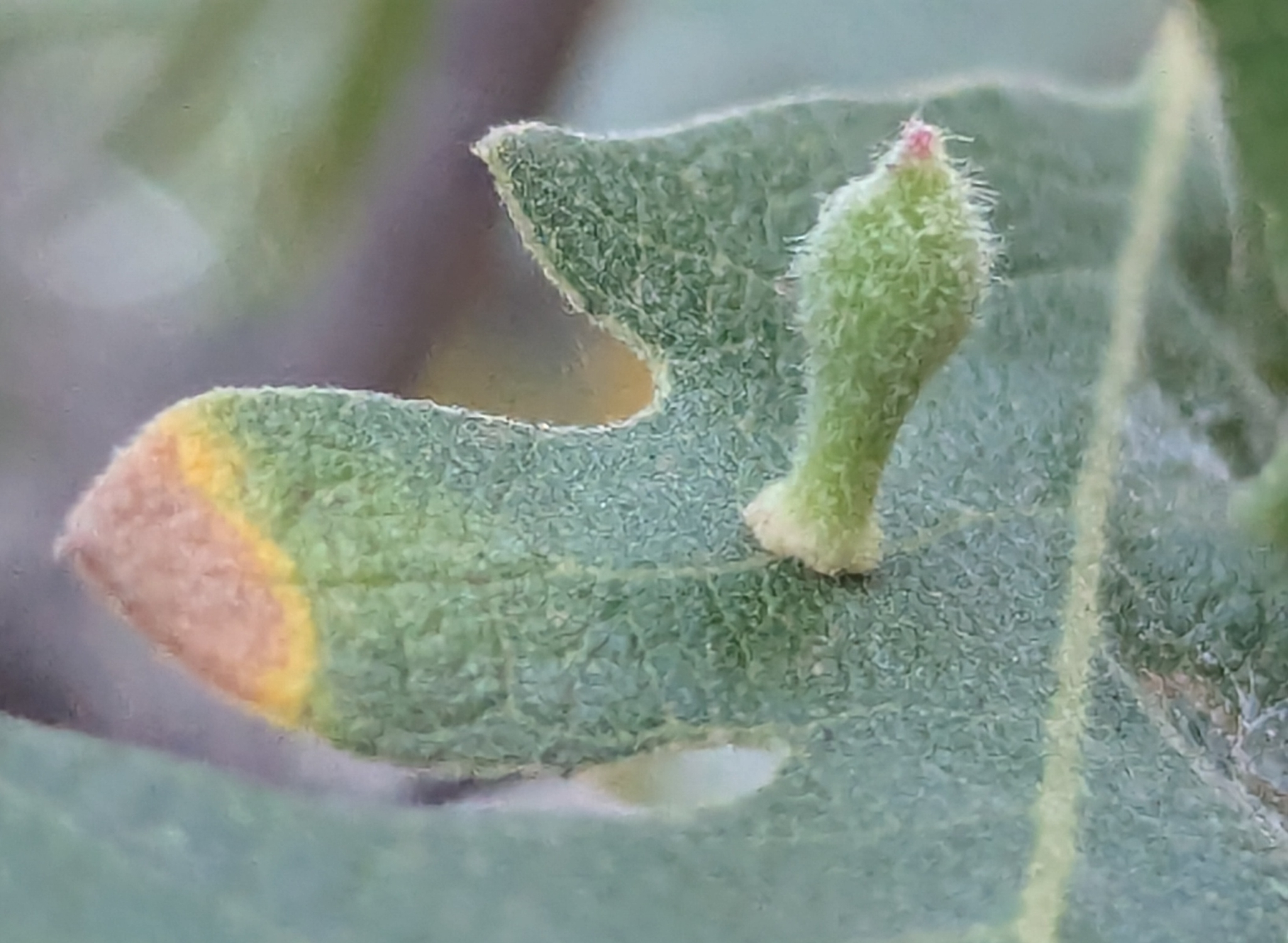
- The gall formed by the asexual generation of X. clavuloides, on the leaf of Quercus lobata, Santa Clara County, 2025

Scientific classification
- Kingdom: Animalia
- Phylum: Arthropoda
- Class: Insecta
- Order: Hymenoptera
- Family: Cynipidae
- Genus: Xanthoteras
- Species: X. clavuloides

Binomial name
- Xanthoteras clavuloides Beutenmuller, 1911

Synonyms
- Cynips clavula; Antron clavula Weld, 1967; Atrusca clavuloides Melika and Abrahamson, 2002; Cynips teres var. clavuloides Kinsey, 1929; Diplolepis clavula Dailey & Menke, 1980; Dryophanta clavula Beutenmuller, 1911

= Xanthoteras clavuloides =

Species of wasp

Xanthoteras clavuloides, also known as the club gall wasp, is a species of gall-inducing wasp. It is native to California, where it induces galls on the leaves of valley oak.

== Description ==
The club gall wasp is named for the hairy, green, club-shaped galls induced by its larvae. The characteristic bulge in the gall is due to the larval chamber. The galls begin developing in August on the underside of leaves, and are fully formed by September when they stand up to 8 mm high. Female adults from the asexual generation emerge in the spring.

The adult female is described as having a brown thorax, yellowish brown legs, black eyes, and translucent wings with brown, heavily marked veins.

== Taxonomy ==
Only the asexual generation is known, and was first described in 1911 by William Beutenmuller under the name Dryophanta clavula. In 1979, Burks recognized this species under Xanthoteras, and in 2002, it was transferred again to the genus Atrusca. However, by the presence of a malar sulcus, or groove on the cheek of the adult female, the organism was distinguished from Atrusca and transferred back to Xanthoteras in 2025.
