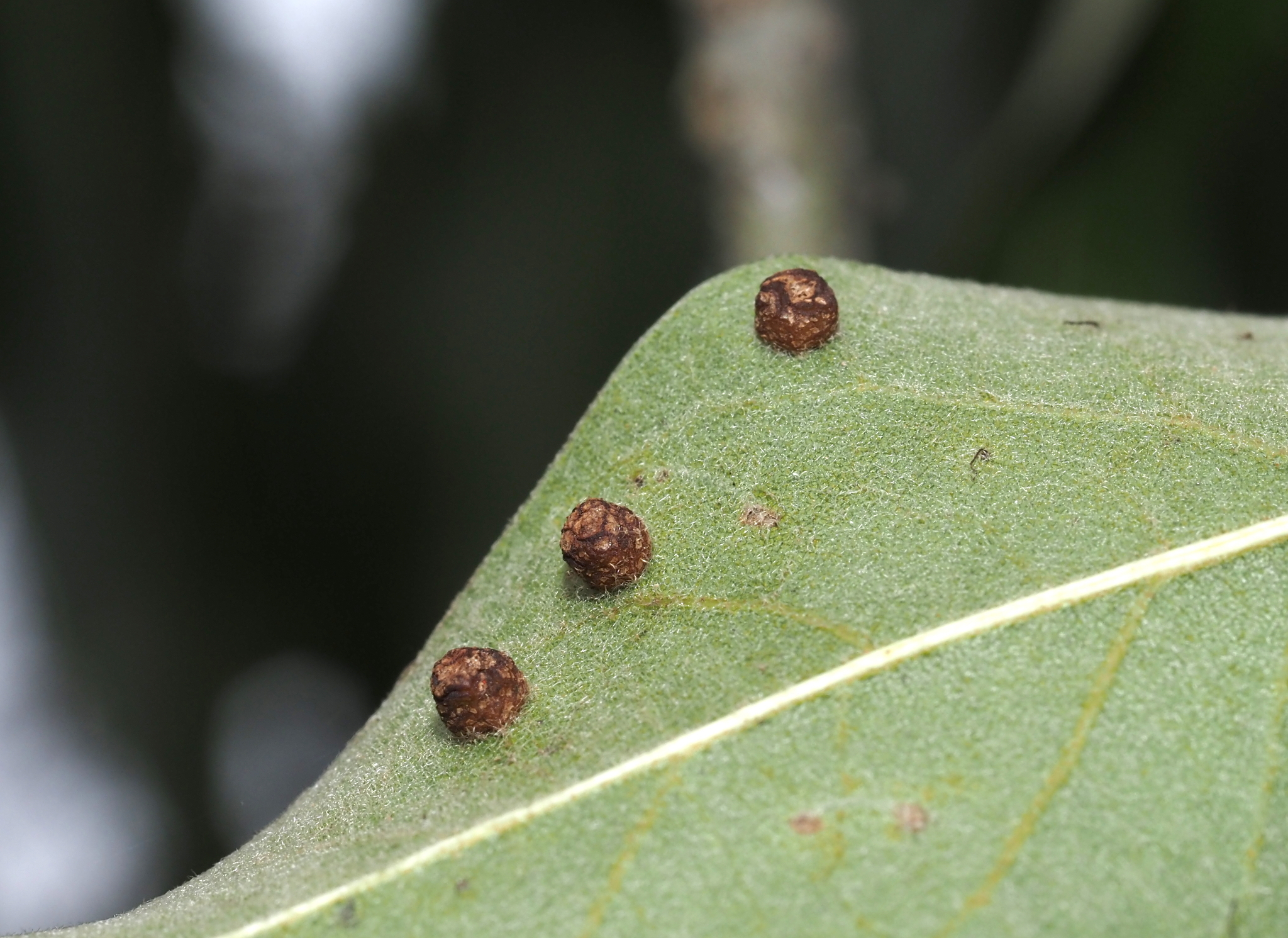

Scientific classification
- Kingdom: Animalia
- Phylum: Arthropoda
- Class: Insecta
- Order: Diptera
- Family: Cecidomyiidae
- Supertribe: Asphondyliidi
- Tribe: Asphondyliini
- Genus: Polystepha
- Species: P. globosa

Binomial name
- Polystepha globosa (Felt, 1909)

Synonyms
- Cincticornia globosa Felt, 1909

= Polystepha globosa =

Species of fly

Polystepha globosa is a species of gall midges in the family Cecidomyiidae.
