= Placochela nigripes =

Scientific classification
- Kingdom: Animalia
- Phylum: Arthropoda
- Class: Insecta
- Order: Diptera
- Family: Cecidomyiidae
- Subfamily: Cecidomyiinae
- Genus: Placochela
- Species: P. nigripes

Binomial name
- Placochela nigripes (F. Löw, 1877)

Synonyms
- Epidosis nigripes F. Löw, 1877

Species of fly

Placochela nigripes is a gall midge which forms galls on the flower buds of elder, honeysuckle and privet. It was described by F Löw in 1877.

== Appearance of the gall ==
Eggs are laid in the spring on the flower buds of wild privet (Ligustrum vulgare), fly honeysuckle (Lonicera xylosteum), danewort (Sambucus ebulus) and elder (Sambucus nigra). The orange larvae prevent the buds from opening and the swollen petals form a cap, which hides the larva. In elder the buds may stay green, or can turn pink or purple. The galls mature in the late summer and the larvae leave and spend the winter in the soil, pupating. Several buds can be occupied in an inflorescence. According to British Plant Galls, P. nigripes alternates between elder and wild privet.

There may be other causes of closed flowers, and larvae need to be examined to confirm they are this species. Trotteria ligrustri is an inquiline; the larvae are dirty yellow and when mature have a pink fat body. Another inquiline is Arnoldiola sambuci, which has white larvae and may also be found in the flowers of elder. Contarinia sambuci also gall the flowers of elder; the jumping larvae are yellow and are found in mainland Europe. In Britain the host of C sambuci is usually the flowers of Viburnum.

== Distribution ==
The insect is found in Europe.
