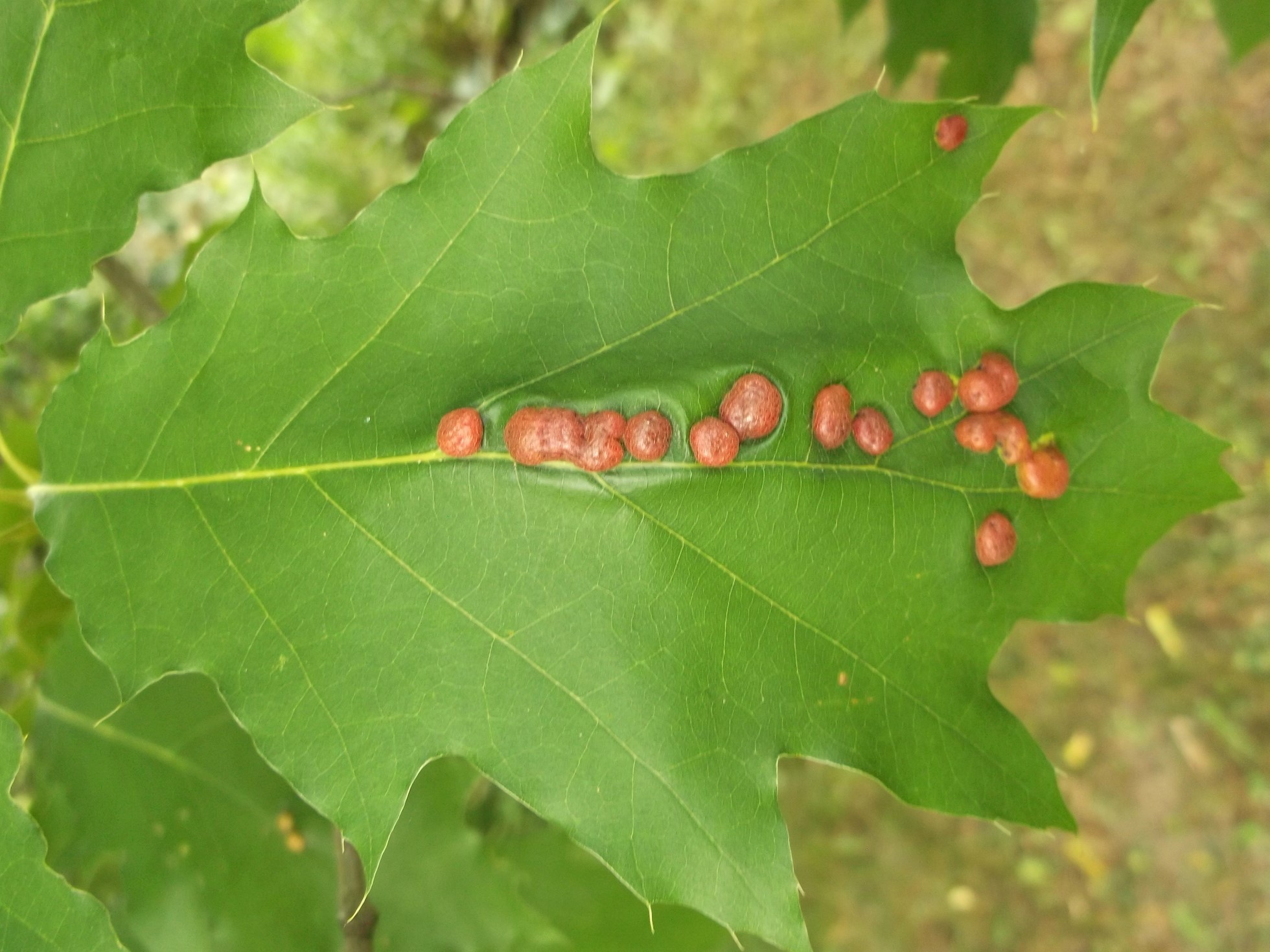
- Polystepha pilulae galls on Quercus rubra

Scientific classification
- Kingdom: Animalia
- Phylum: Arthropoda
- Class: Insecta
- Order: Diptera
- Family: Cecidomyiidae
- Genus: Polystepha
- Species: P. pilulae

Binomial name
- Polystepha pilulae (Beutenmüller, 1892)

Synonyms
- Cincticornia pilulae Beutenmüller, 1892

= Polystepha pilulae =

Species of fly

Polystepha pilulae, the oak leaf gall midge, is a species of gall midge in the family Cecidomyiidae. It is found in eastern North America.

== Description of the gall ==
The larvae of this species of midge form circular galls that can be flat or convex. These form on the upper surface of oak leaves of the red oak group (Quercus sect. Lobatae), between the veins. The galls are thick-walled and reddish-brown in colour. They are 3 to 4 mm in diameter.

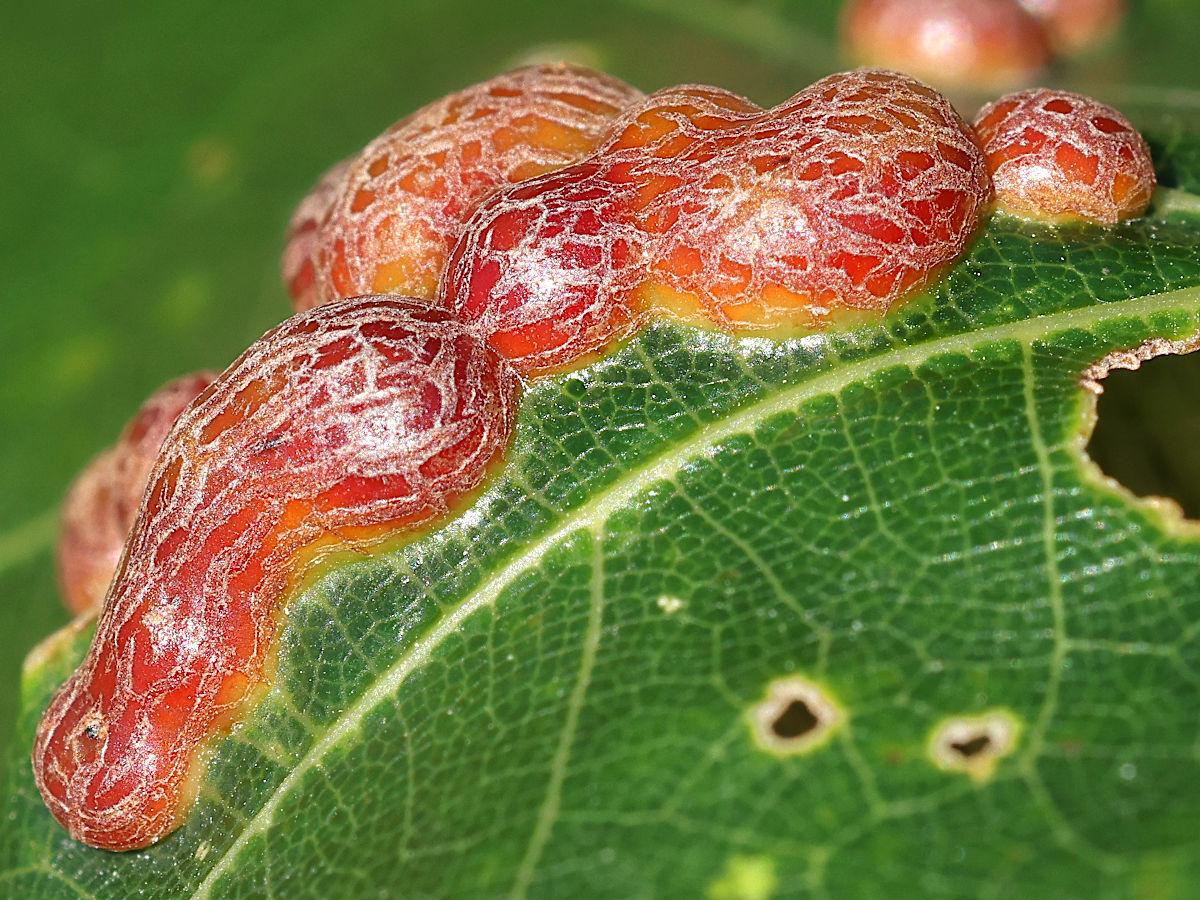
closeup view of galls
