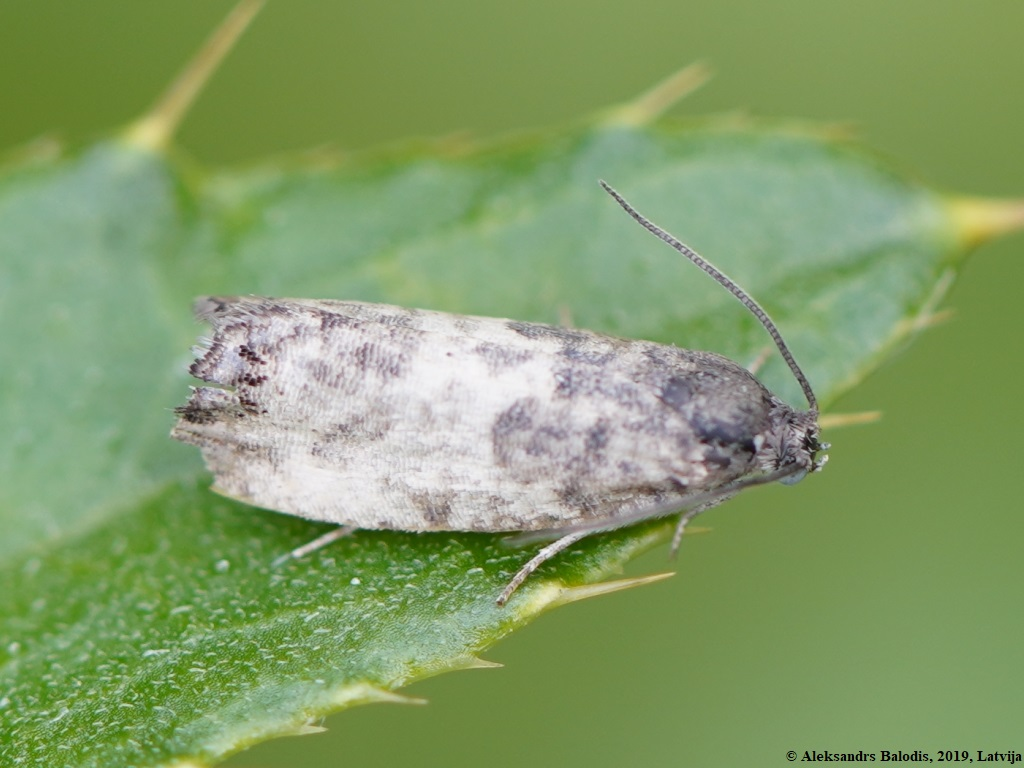

Scientific classification
- Kingdom: Animalia
- Phylum: Arthropoda
- Class: Insecta
- Order: Lepidoptera
- Family: Tortricidae
- Genus: Cydia
- Species: C. servillana

Binomial name
- Cydia servillana (Duponchel, 1836)

Synonyms
- Penthina servillana Duponchel, in Godart, 1836; Carpocapsa putaminana Staudinger, 1859

= Cydia servillana =

Species of moth

Cydia servillana is a moth of the family Tortricidae which forms galls on the young shoots of willow (Salix species). It was first described by Philogène Auguste Joseph Duponchel in 1836.

== Description ==
A single egg is laid on the buds of the food plant in May and June. The newly hatched larva enters the twig near the apex of the bud. At first the frass is ejected but as the larva penetrates the twig the frass packs the tunnel. The gall is a spindle-shaped swelling, which can be difficult to find, on a one- or two-year-old willow shoot. Inside, the 3 cm tunnel-like chamber contains a larva or pupa. The larva overwinters fully fed in a cocoon, preparing an exit hole before it pupates in April or May. The exit hole is just above a bud and is covered by silk mixed with reddish frass. When the moth emerges the pupal exuviae is left in the exit hole making the gall easier to find.

The gall has been recorded on eared willow (Salix aurita), goat willow (S. caprea), grey willow (S. cinerea) and creeping willow S. repens.

== Distribution ==
Has been recorded from Belgium, Germany, Great Britain (uncommon in southern England and Wales), Russia and Sweden.
