= Pseudoneuroterus mazandarani =

Scientific classification
- Kingdom: Animalia
- Phylum: Arthropoda
- Class: Insecta
- Order: Hymenoptera
- Family: Cynipidae
- Genus: Pseudoneuroterus
- Species: P. mazandarani

Binomial name
- Pseudoneuroterus mazandarani Melika and Stone, 2010

Species of wasp

Pseudoneuroterus mazandarani is a gall wasp species in the family Cynipidae whose life cycle involves only Palaearctic oaks, Quercus subgen. Quercus, in the section Cerris. The species is named for the Mazandaran province of Iran where it was collected. Gall wasps evolved in the Northern Hemisphere and started as herb gallers. Through natural selection they went through a period where they lost the ability to initiate galls and later regained it back. It is suggested the first gall wasps were associated with woody host plants.

== Description ==
=== Morphological description ===
Pseudoneuroterus mazandarani females are small, 1.8–2.1 mm in body length. The body is dark brown, with the metasoma and lower face somewhat lighter. The legs and antennae are light brown, and the scape and pedicel are yellowish. The antennae have 12 flagellomeres and are longer than the head and mesosoma together. The head is rounded in front view, with the genae noticeably expanded posterior to the compound eyes. The mesosoma is densely white setose and longer than high in lateral view. The metasoma is smooth, glossy, and setose-less.

=== Gall structure and development ===
The gall, caused by P. mazandarani, is a fleshy, firm swelling at the base of the midrib or along major veins of leaves of Quercus castaneifolia. The galls are multilocular and irregular, reaching up to 15 mm in length and 10–15 mm in width. There are several round larval chambers in a gall, measuring around 3–4 mm in diameter, embedded in the swollen parenchymal tissue. Young galls are pale greenish to yellowish and are tender throughout their development. The larva is fed by nutritive tissue within the gall, which feeds it up until pupation.

=== Life cycle and penology ===
Only the asexual generation of this species is known so far. Galls begin to form early in May and reach maturity towards the end of the month. The adults emerge in June, exceptionally early for most of the other gall wasps in the genera Pseudoneuroterus and Neuroterus, whose galls are mature in late autumn or during the summer. This phenology is exceptional for P. mazandarani compared to its close relatives.

=== Habitat and distribution ===
The species is only known to inhabit northern Iran. It is locally frequent in the type locality at Sari, where it occurs in Hyrcanian forest vegetation-dominated habitat. Its host, Quercus castaneifolia, is a dominant oak in this temperate broadleaf environment. This host specialization, and early-season gall development, reflect ecological adaptation to local environmental pressures.
