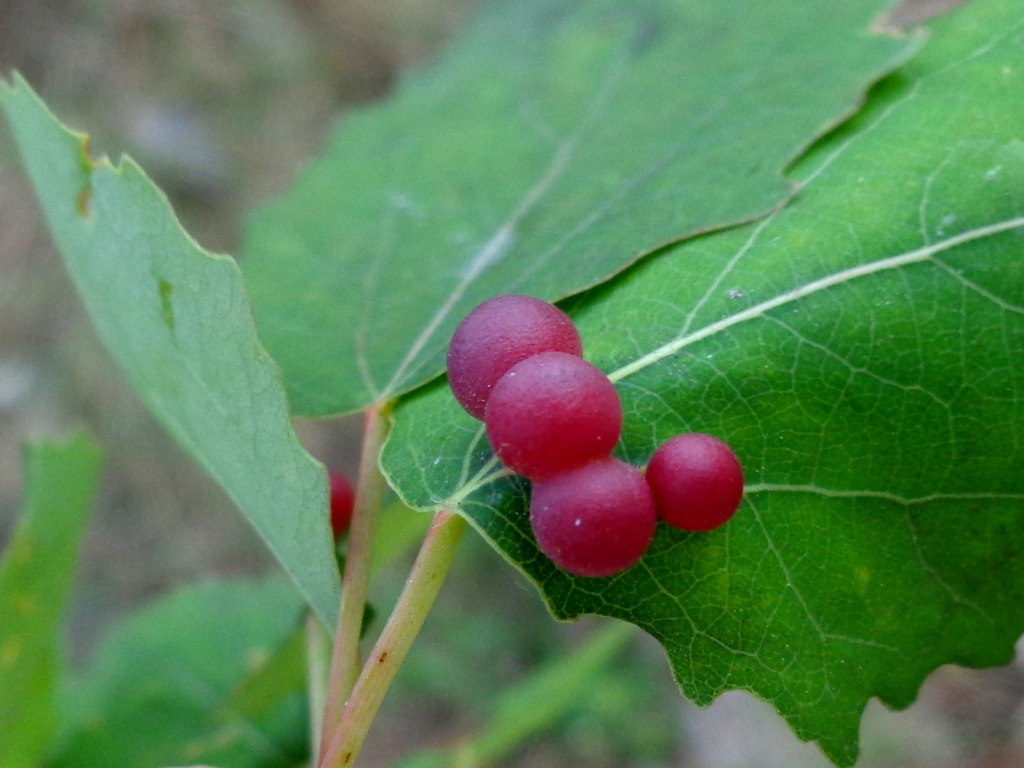
- H. tremulae galls.

Scientific classification
- Kingdom: Animalia
- Phylum: Arthropoda
- Class: Insecta
- Order: Diptera
- Family: Cecidomyiidae
- Subfamily: Cecidomyiinae
- Supertribe: Cecidomyiidi
- Genus: Harmandiola
- Species: H. tremulae

Binomial name
- Harmandiola tremulae (Winnertz, 1853)

Synonyms
- Cecidomyia tremulae Winnertz, 1853; Diplosis loewii Rübsaamen, 1892; Harmandia loewi (Rübsaamen, 1892); Harmandia tremulae (Winnertz, 1853); Harmandiola loewii (Rübsaamen, 1892)

= Harmandiola tremulae =

Species of insect

Harmandiola tremulae, the aspen leaf gall midge, is a species of gall midge in the family Cecidomyiidae.

== Description ==
"The larvae live in galls on the leaves of Populus tremula and two different forms can be found. One is the size of a pea, green, red, or green and red, hard, with a slightly wrinkled surface, and is found on the leaf surface or leaf veins in clusters. The second form is much smaller, usually yellowish but can also be red or green. The substance is usually looser, spongy or pithy with a small single-chambered larval cavity. The gall is usually not perfectly round, as they are clustered close together on the leaf surface, they become angular due to squeezing each other. Both types of galls open on the underside of the leaf, rarely on the side, mature in August and September, and release the larvae into the ground, where they develop either in the autumn or the following spring. Regarding the two following galls, I cannot agree with Winnertz. He considers them to be varieties of the previous one, but in my experience, they must be considered as independent forms." Translated from 'Overview of the gall formations that occur in Tilia, Salix, Populus, Artemisia, along with comments on some other galls', by Dr. F. Rudow.
