= Rhinusa pilosa =

Scientific classification
- Domain: Eukaryota
- Kingdom: Animalia
- Phylum: Arthropoda
- Class: Insecta
- Order: Coleoptera
- Suborder: Polyphaga
- Infraorder: Cucujiformia
- Family: Curculionidae
- Genus: Rhinusa
- Species: R. pilosa

Binomial name
- Rhinusa pilosa (Gyllenhal, 1838)

Species of beetle

Rhinusa pilosa is a species of true weevil in the family of beetles known as Curculionidae. It is found exclusively on Linaria vulgaris Mill. (Plantaginaceae), also known as common or yellow toadflax where it creates a gall on the plant's stem, and was found originally in Serbia. R. pilosa has been introduced in the United States and Canada as an biocontrol agent to control L. vulgaris.

Two related species formerly considered part of R. pilosa are Rhinusa brondelii and Rhinusa rara, which feed on Linaria purpurea and Linaria genistifolia/Linaria dalmatica, respectively.
