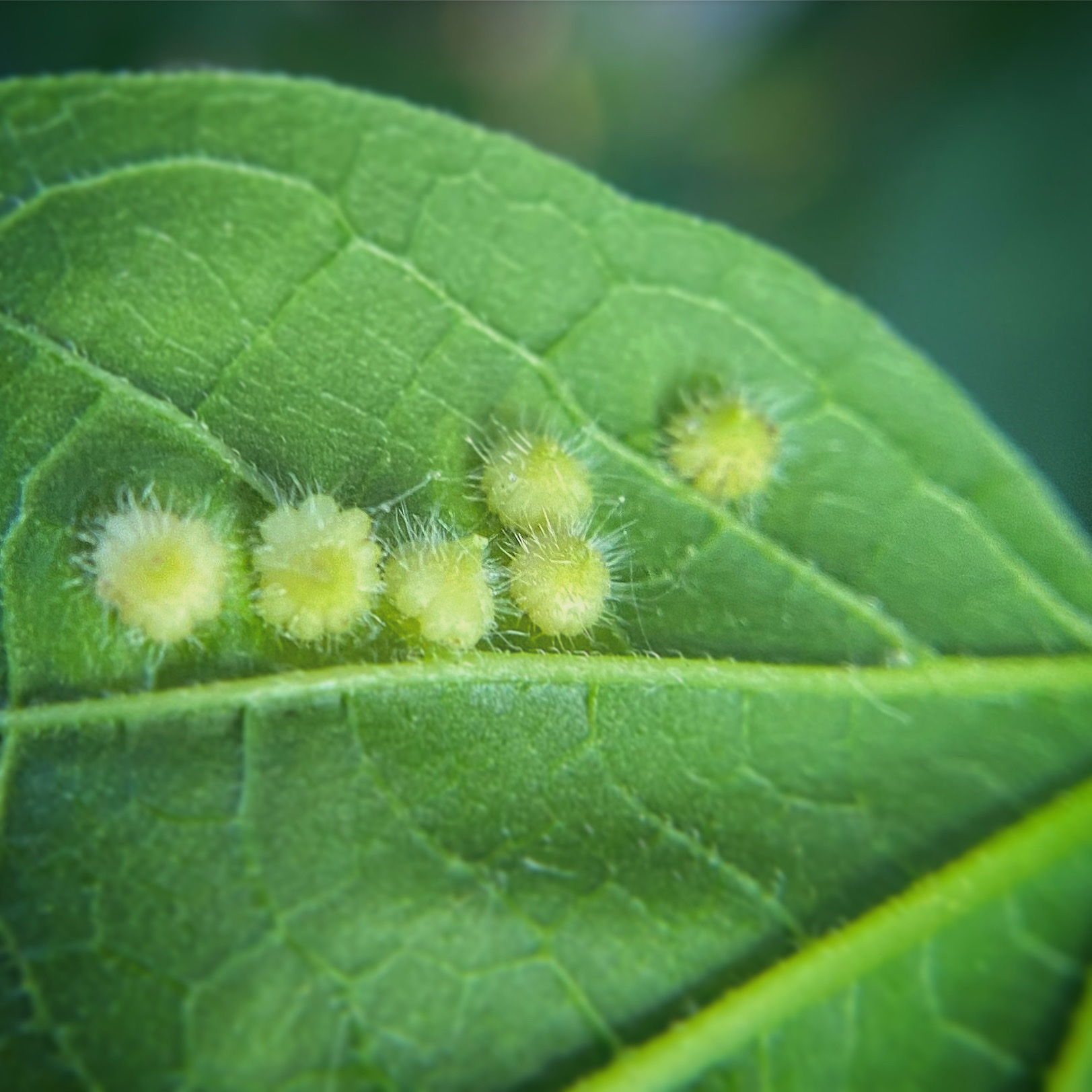
- Hackberry rosette gall

Scientific classification
- Domain: Eukaryota
- Kingdom: Animalia
- Phylum: Arthropoda
- Class: Insecta
- Order: Diptera
- Family: Cecidomyiidae
- Genus: Celticecis
- Species: C. capsularis

Binomial name
- Celticecis capsularis (Patton, 1897)

Synonyms
- Cecidomyiaceltis capsularis Patton, 1897

= Celticecis capsularis =

Species of fly

Celticecis capsularis, the hackberry rosette gall midge, is a species of gall midge in the family Cecidomyiidae.
