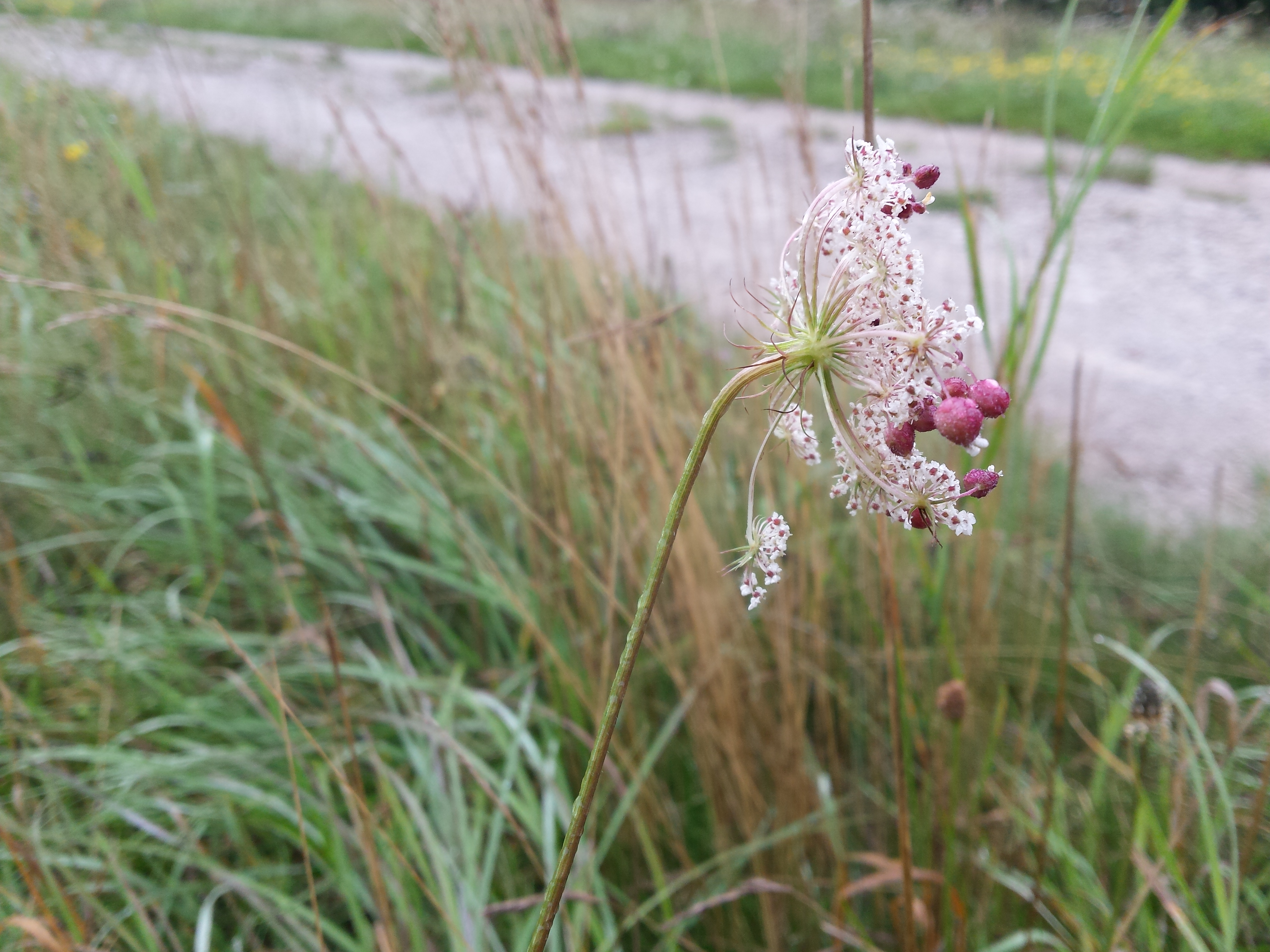
- Kiefferia pericarpiicola gall on Daucus carota

Scientific classification
- Kingdom: Animalia
- Phylum: Arthropoda
- Clade: Pancrustacea
- Class: Insecta
- Order: Diptera
- Family: Cecidomyiidae
- Genus: Kiefferia
- Species: K. pericarpiicola

Binomial name
- Kiefferia pericarpiicola (Bremi, 1847)

= Kiefferia pericarpiicola =

Species of fly

Kiefferia pericarpiicola is a species of fly in the family Cecidomyiidae. It is found in the Palearctic. The larvae gall on Apiaceae.
