= Polystepha quercifolia =

Scientific classification
- Kingdom: Animalia
- Phylum: Arthropoda
- Class: Insecta
- Order: Diptera
- Family: Cecidomyiidae
- Supertribe: Asphondyliidi
- Tribe: Asphondyliini
- Genus: Polystepha
- Species: P. quercifolia

Binomial name
- Polystepha quercifolia (Felt, 1908)

Synonyms
- Cincticornia quercifolia Felt, 1908

Species of fly

Polystepha quercifolia is a species of gall midges in the family Cecidomyiidae.
