= Macrodiplosis erubescens =

Scientific classification
- Domain: Eukaryota
- Kingdom: Animalia
- Phylum: Arthropoda
- Class: Insecta
- Order: Diptera
- Family: Cecidomyiidae
- Supertribe: Cecidomyiidi
- Genus: Macrodiplosis
- Species: M. erubescens

Binomial name
- Macrodiplosis erubescens (Osten Sacken, 1862)

Synonyms
- Cecidomyia erubescens Osten Sacken, 1862; Cecidomyia foliora Russell and Hooker, 1908

Species of fly

Macrodiplosis erubescens is a species of gall midges, insects in the family Cecidomyiidae.
