= Macrodiplosis qoruca =

Scientific classification
- Domain: Eukaryota
- Kingdom: Animalia
- Phylum: Arthropoda
- Class: Insecta
- Order: Diptera
- Family: Cecidomyiidae
- Genus: Macrodiplosis
- Species: M. qoruca

Binomial name
- Macrodiplosis qoruca (Felt, 1925)

Synonyms
- Cecidomyia q-oruca Felt, 1925

Species of fly

Macrodiplosis qoruca is a species of gall midges, insects in the family Cecidomyiidae.
