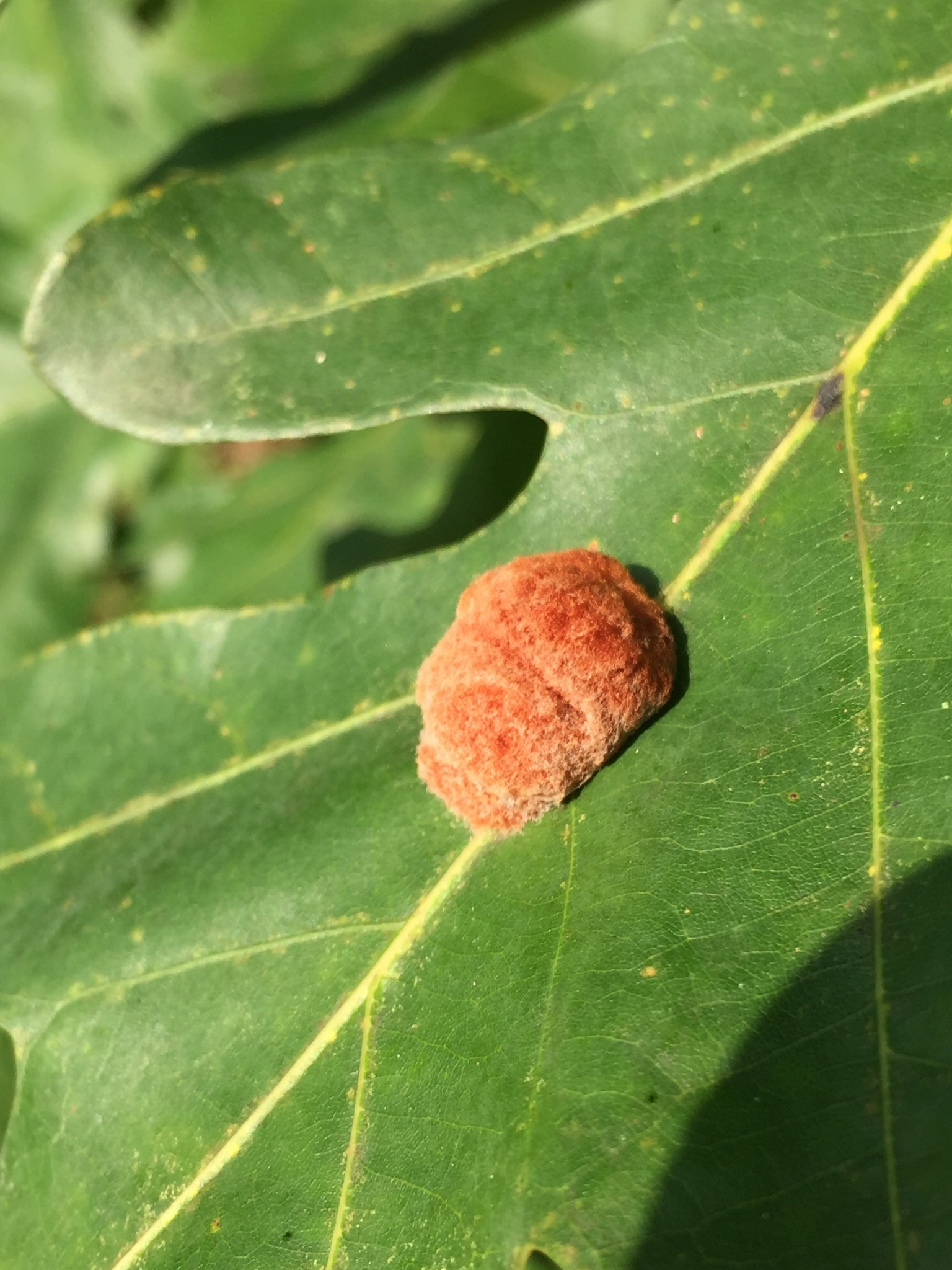
- Gall caused by Andricus quercusflocci

Scientific classification
- Kingdom: Animalia
- Phylum: Arthropoda
- Class: Insecta
- Order: Hymenoptera
- Family: Cynipidae
- Genus: Andricus
- Species: A. quercusflocci

Binomial name
- Andricus quercusflocci (Walsh, 1864)

= Andricus quercusflocci =

Species of wasp

Andricus quercusflocci is a species of gall wasp in the family Cynipidae.
