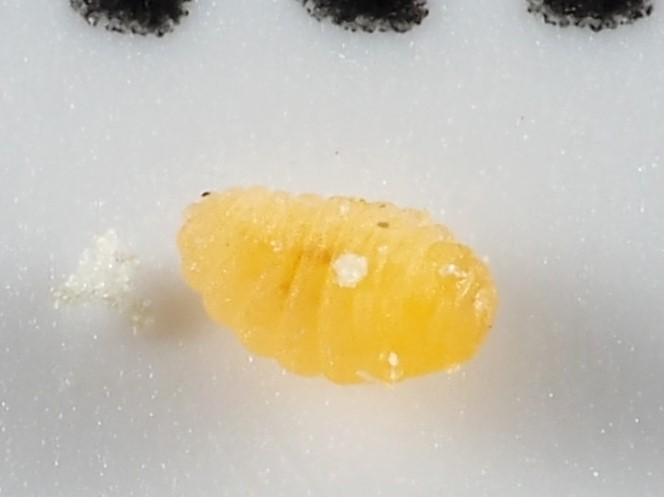

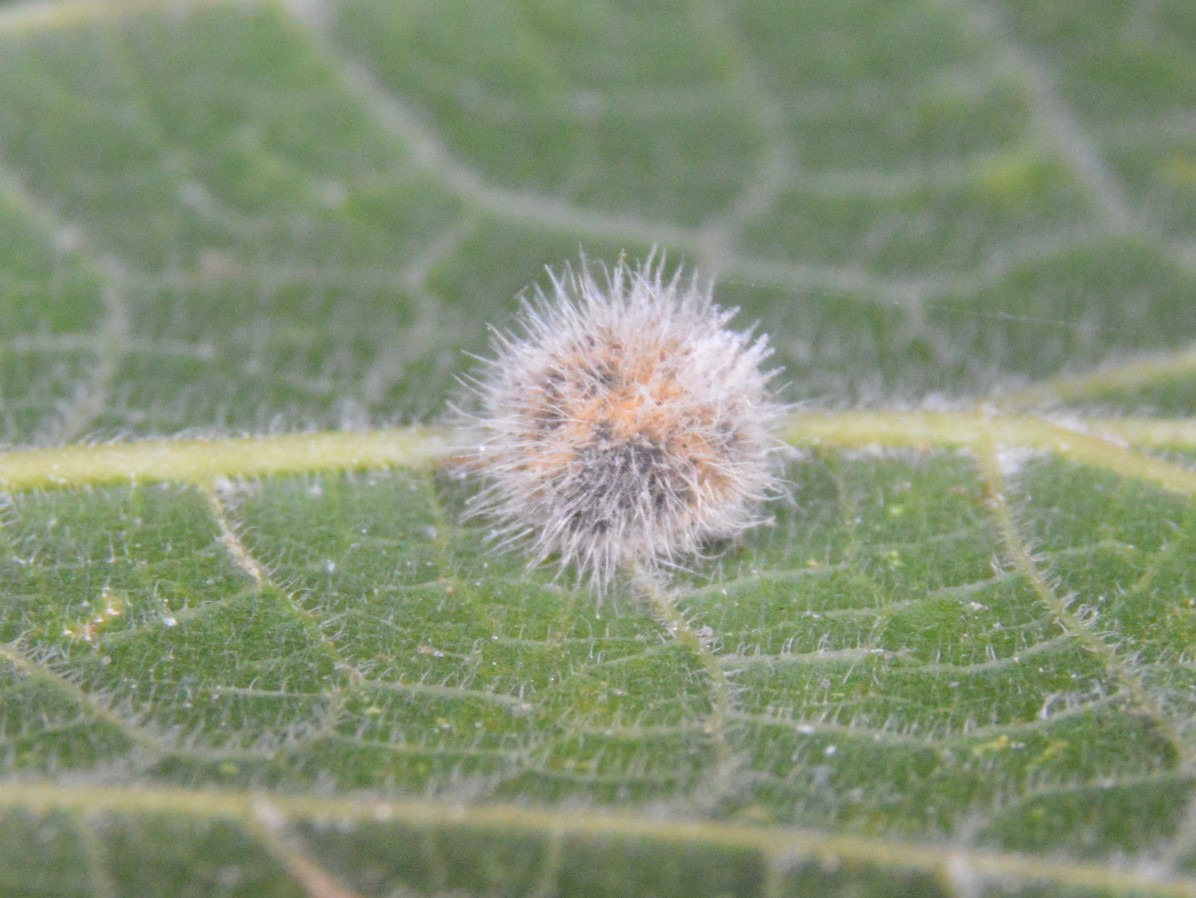
- Larva (top) and hackberry pubescent gall (bottom)

Scientific classification
- Domain: Eukaryota
- Kingdom: Animalia
- Phylum: Arthropoda
- Class: Insecta
- Order: Diptera
- Family: Cecidomyiidae
- Supertribe: Lasiopteridi
- Genus: Celticecis
- Species: C. pubescens

Binomial name
- Celticecis pubescens (Patton, 1897)

Synonyms
- Cecidomyiaceltis pubescens Patton, 1897

= Celticecis pubescens =

Species of fly

Celticecis pubescens, the hackberry pubescent gall midge, is a species of gall midges in the family Cecidomyiidae.
