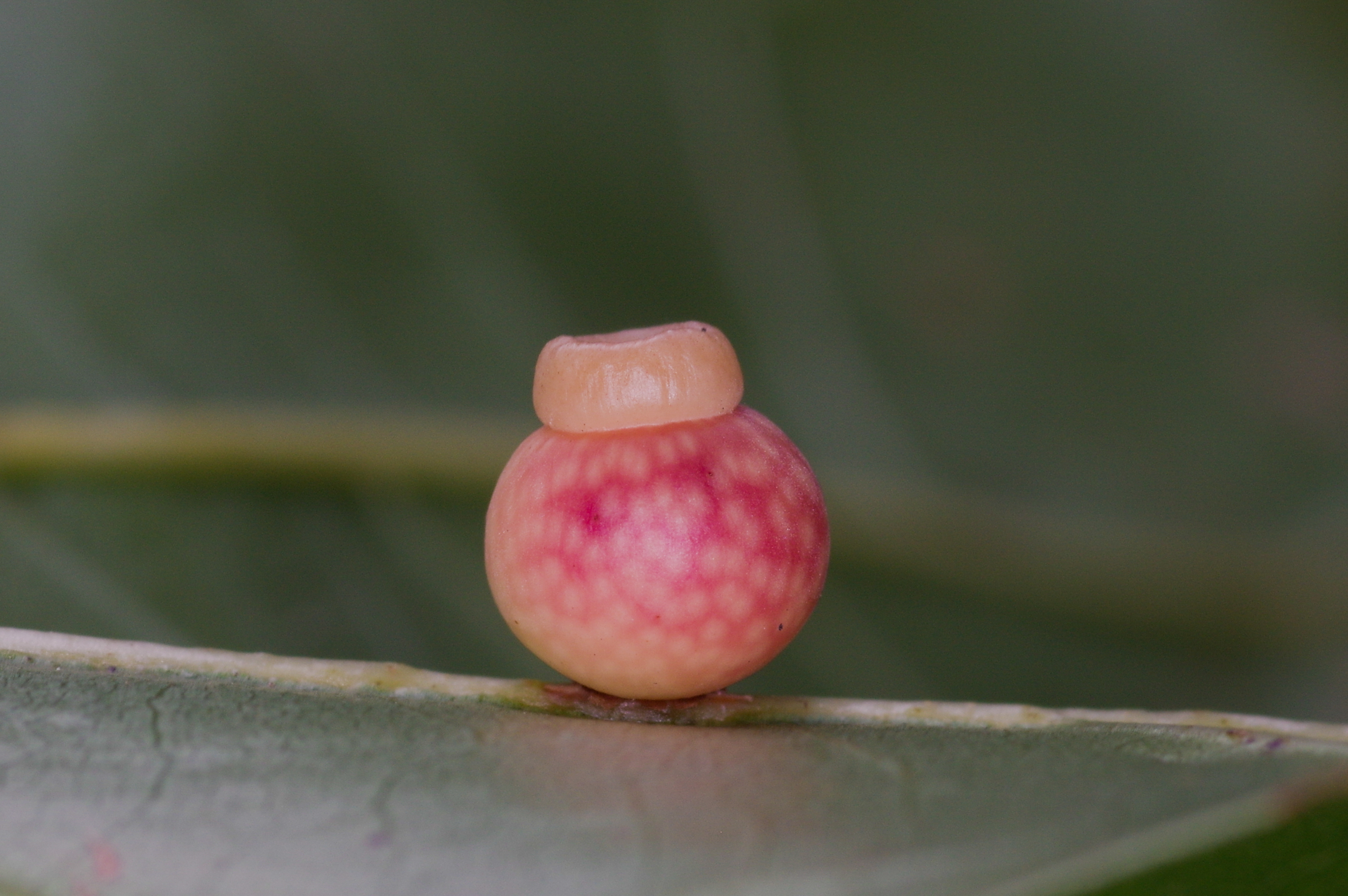

Scientific classification
- Kingdom: Animalia
- Phylum: Arthropoda
- Class: Insecta
- Order: Hymenoptera
- Family: Cynipidae
- Genus: Kokkocynips
- Species: K. rileyi

Binomial name
- Kokkocynips rileyi (Nieves-Aldrey, 2021)

= Dryocosmus rileyi =

Species of wasp

Kokkocynips rileyi is a species of gall wasp in the family Cynipidae. K. rileyi has two structures; a gall body and a kapello. The kapello. is a fatty lipid rich appendage that attracts ants for gall dispersal, similar to myrmecochorous seeds.

Previously in the genus Dryocosmus, but rearranged into Kokkocynips.
