= Macrodiplosis majalis =

Scientific classification
- Domain: Eukaryota
- Kingdom: Animalia
- Phylum: Arthropoda
- Class: Insecta
- Order: Diptera
- Family: Cecidomyiidae
- Supertribe: Cecidomyiidi
- Genus: Macrodiplosis
- Species: M. majalis

Binomial name
- Macrodiplosis majalis (Osten Sacken, 1878)

Synonyms
- Cecidomyia majalis Osten Sacken, 1878

Species of fly

Macrodiplosis majalis is a species of gall midges, insects in the family Cecidomyiidae.
