= Pseudoneuroterus nichollsi =

Scientific classification
- Kingdom: Animalia
- Phylum: Arthropoda
- Class: Insecta
- Order: Hymenoptera
- Family: Cynipidae
- Genus: Pseudoneuroterus
- Species: P. nichollsi

Binomial name
- Pseudoneuroterus nichollsi Melika and Stone, 2010

Species of wasp

Pseudoneuroterus nichollsi is a gall wasp species in the family Cynipidae whose life cycle involves only Palaearctic oaks, Quercus subgen. Quercus, in the section Cerris.
