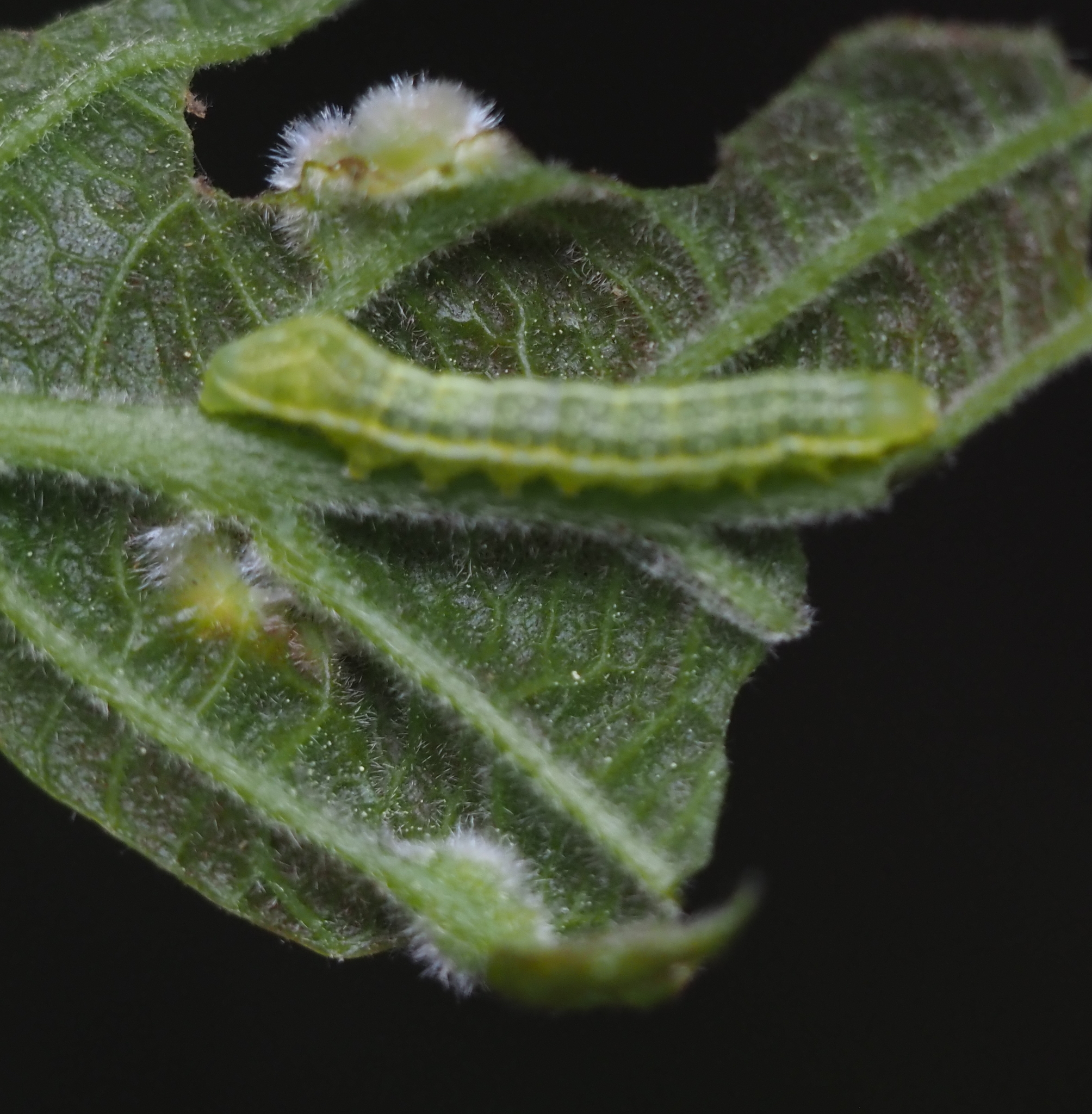

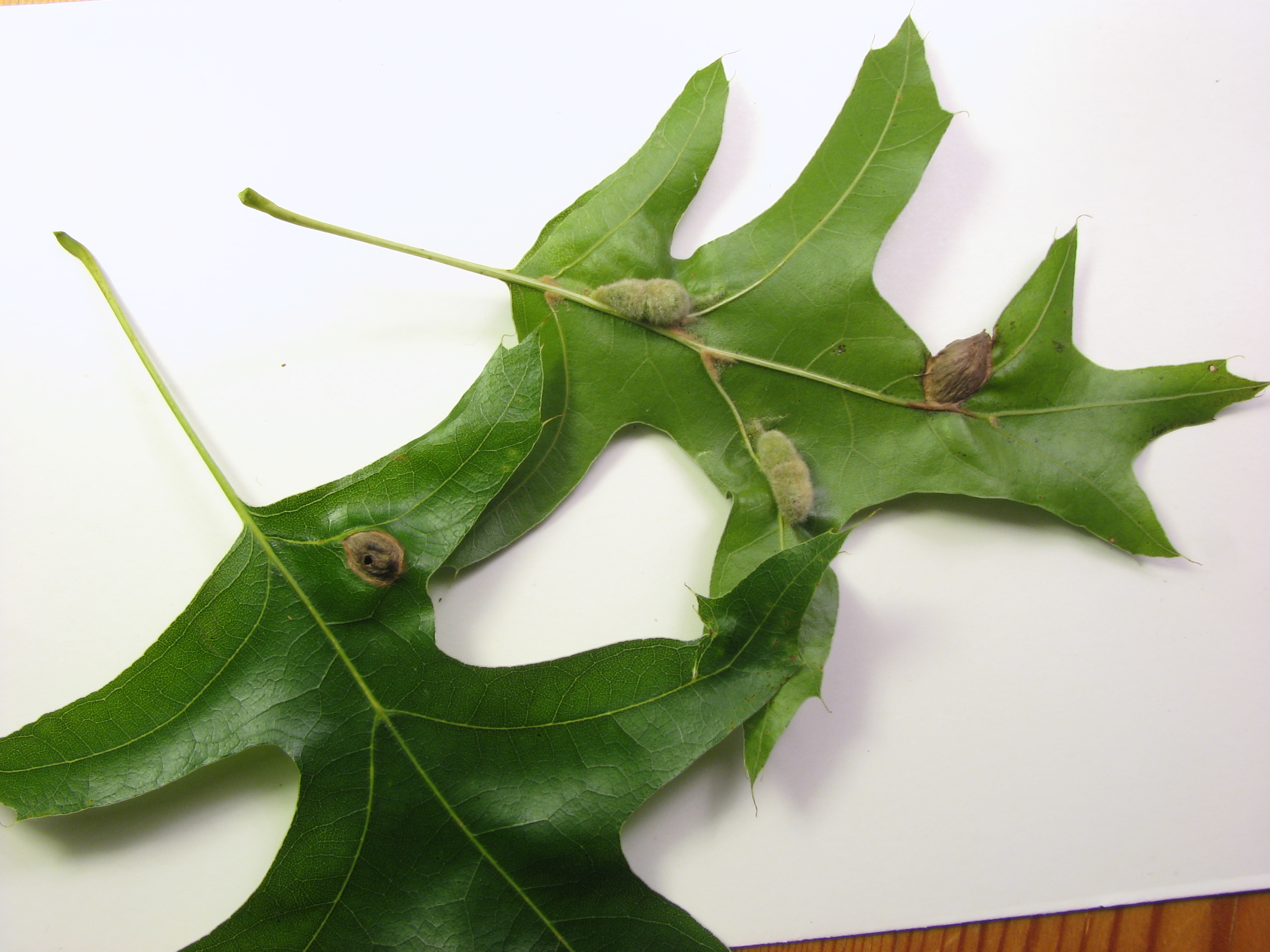
- Larva (top) and galls on red oak leaves (bottom)

Scientific classification
- Domain: Eukaryota
- Kingdom: Animalia
- Phylum: Arthropoda
- Class: Insecta
- Order: Diptera
- Family: Cecidomyiidae
- Genus: Macrodiplosis
- Species: M. niveipila

Binomial name
- Macrodiplosis niveipila (Osten Sacken, 1862)

Synonyms
- Cecidomyia niveipila Osten Sacken, 1862

= Macrodiplosis niveipila =

Species of fly

Macrodiplosis niveipila is a species of gall midge in the family Cecidomyiidae.
