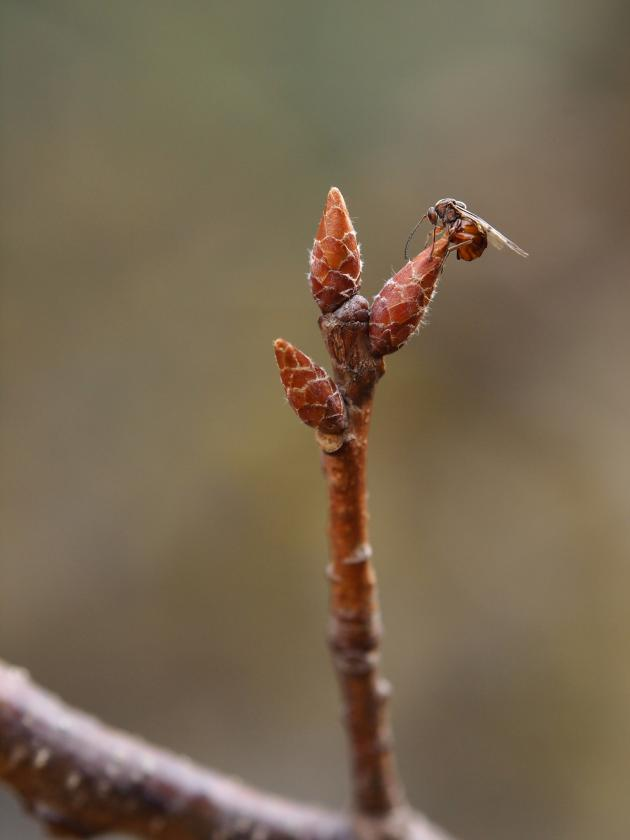

Scientific classification
- Kingdom: Animalia
- Phylum: Arthropoda
- Class: Insecta
- Order: Hymenoptera
- Family: Cynipidae
- Genus: Trichagalma
- Species: T. formosana

Binomial name
- Trichagalma formosana Melika and Tang, 2010

= Trichagalma formosana =

Species of wasp

Trichagalma formosana is a gall wasp species in the family Cynipidae whose life cycle involves only Palaearctic oaks, Quercus subgen. Quercus, in the section Cerris. It is endemic to Taiwan.

== Description and biology ==
Trichagalma formosana is only known from galls on Quercus variabilis and Q. acutissima. New galls appear in August. Adults emerged in December in the lab, but in the wild they might overwinter in the gall and emerge next spring. The galls reach a diameter of 15 mm (0.59 in). Only asexual females are known, measuring about 5 mm (0.20 in) in body length.

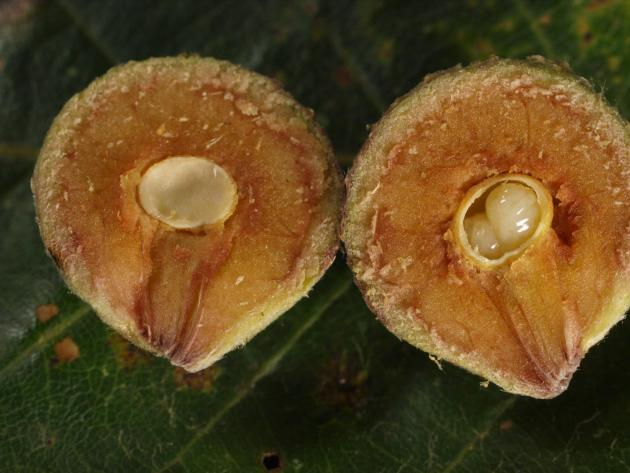
Trichagalma formosana open gall

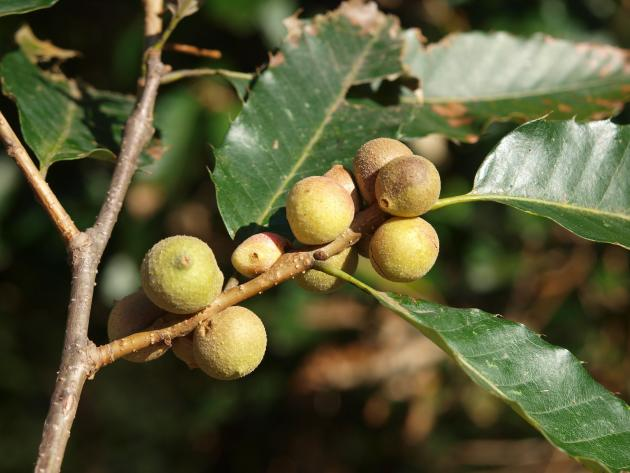
Trichagalma formosana galls
