= Harmandiola castaneae =

Scientific classification
- Kingdom: Animalia
- Phylum: Arthropoda
- Class: Insecta
- Order: Diptera
- Family: Cecidomyiidae
- Supertribe: Cecidomyiidi
- Genus: Harmandiola
- Species: H. castaneae

Binomial name
- Harmandiola castaneae (Stebbins, 1910)

Synonyms
- Cecidomyia castaneae Stebbins, 1910; Macrodiplosis castaneae (Stebbins, 1910)

Species of fly

Harmandiola castaneae is a species of gall midge, insects in the family Cecidomyiidae. This species induces leaf galls on Castanea dentata. It was first described by Fannie Adelle Stebbins in 1910.
