= List of Dasineura species =

This is a list of 497 species in Dasineura, a genus of gall midges in the family Cecidomyiidae.

== Dasineura species ==
- Dasineura aberrata (Felt, 1908)^{i c g}
- Dasineura abiesemia (Foote, 1956)^{i c g}
- Dasineura abietiperda (Henschel, 1880)^{c g}
- Dasineura acaciaelongifoliae (Skuse, 1890)^{c g}
- Dasineura acerifolia (Felt, 1907)^{c g}
- Dasineura acerifoliae (Felt, 1907)^{i c g}
- Dasineura aceris (Shimer, 1868)^{i c g}
- Dasineura acerobia (Kovalev, 1967)^{c g}
- Dasineura acrophila (Winnertz, 1853)^{c g}
- Dasineura acuminata (Rübsaamen, 1916)^{c g}
- Dasineura adenophorae (Kovalev, 1967)^{c g}
- Dasineura affinis (Kieffer, 1886)^{c g}
- Dasineura airae (Kieffer, 1897)^{c g}
- Dasineura alatavica Fedotova, 1990^{c g}
- Dasineura albohirta (Felt, 1908)^{i c g}
- Dasineura albovittata (Walsh, 1864)^{i c g}
- Dasineura alliicola Fedotova, 1993^{c g}
- Dasineura alopecuri (Reuter, 1895)^{i c g}
- Dasineura alpestris (Kieffer, 1909)^{c g}
- Dasineura altajensis Fedotova, 1997^{c g}
- Dasineura alyssi (Kieffer, 1901)^{c g}
- Dasineura amaramanjarae Grover, 1965^{c g}
- Dasineura americana (Felt, 1913)^{i c g}
- Dasineura ammodendronae Fedotova, 1993^{c g}
- Dasineura andrieuxi (Tavares, 1902)^{c g}
- Dasineura anemone (Felt, 1907)^{i c g}
- Dasineura angelicae (Rübsaamen, 1916)^{c g}
- Dasineura anglica (Kieffer, 1909)^{c g}
- Dasineura antennata (Felt, 1908)^{i c g}
- Dasineura aparines (Kieffer, 1889)^{c g}
- Dasineura aparinicola Fedotova, 1997^{c g}
- Dasineura apicata (Felt, 1908)^{i c g}
- Dasineura armoraciae (Vimmer, 1936)^{c g}
- Dasineura aromaticae (Felt, 1909)^{i c g}
- Dasineura artemisiae (Rübsaamen, 1916)^{c}
- Dasineura asparagi (Tavares, 1902)^{c g}
- Dasineura asparagiiflora Fedotova, 1993^{c g}
- Dasineura asperulae (Low, 1875)^{c g}
- Dasineura asteriae (Shinji, 1942)^{c g}
- Dasineura astericola (Kieffer, 1909)^{c g}
- Dasineura astragalorum (Kieffer, 1909)^{c g}
- Dasineura atraphaxiflorae Fedotova, 1984^{c g}
- Dasineura attenuata (Felt, 1908)^{i c g}
- Dasineura aucupariae (Kieffer, 1909)^{c g}
- Dasineura augusta (Felt, 1908)^{i c g}
- Dasineura auricomi (Kieffer, 1909)^{c g}
- Dasineura aurihirta (Felt, 1908)^{i c g}
- Dasineura auritae (Rübsaamen, 1916)^{c g}
- Dasineura axillaris (Kieffer, 1896)^{c g}
- Dasineura azutavica Fedotova, 1996^{c g}
- Dasineura balsamicola (Lintner, 1888)^{i c g}
- Dasineura balsamifera (Felt, 1908)^{i c g}
- Dasineura banksiae Kolesik, 2007^{c g}
- Dasineura barbareae Stelter, 1992^{c g}
- Dasineura basavannii Vasanthakumar and Udikeri, 2025
- Dasineura bayeri (Rübsaamen, 1914)^{c g}
- Dasineura beccariella (Guercio, 1918)^{c g}
- Dasineura berberidis (Kieffer, 1909)^{c g}
- Dasineura berestae Fedotova, 1993^{c g}
- Dasineura berteroae (Stelter, 1976)^{c g}
- Dasineura berti Sylven, 1993^{c g}
- Dasineura betuleti (Kieffer, 1886)^{c g}
- Dasineura bidentata (Felt, 1907)^{i c g}
- Dasineura bistortae (Kieffer, 1909)^{c g}
- Dasineura borealis (Felt, 1907)^{i c g}
- Dasineura bragancae (Tavares, 1904)^{c g}
- Dasineura brassicae (Winnertz, 1853)^{c g}
- Dasineura braziliensis (Tavares, 1922)^{c g}
- Dasineura broteri (Tavares, 1901)^{c g}
- Dasineura brunellae (Kieffer, 1909)^{c g}
- Dasineura bupleuri (Wachtl, 1883)^{c g}
- Dasineura bursakovi Fedotova, 1996^{c g}
- Dasineura bursifex (Kieffer, 1909)^{c g}
- Dasineura californica (Felt, 1908)^{i c g}
- Dasineura callistemoni Hills-Hayes, 2017^{g}
- Dasineura callitridis Kolesik, 2000^{c g}
- Dasineura calophacifoliae Fedotova, 1989^{c g}
- Dasineura campanulae (Rübsaamen, 1914)^{c g}
- Dasineura campanularum (Kieffer, 1909)^{c g}
- Dasineura canadensis (Felt, 1907)^{c g}
- Dasineura capsulae (Kieffer, 1901)^{c g}
- Dasineura carbonaria (Felt, 1907)^{i c g b}
- Dasineura cardaminicola (Rübsaamen, 1916)^{c g}
- Dasineura cardaminis (Winnertz, 1853)^{c g}
- Dasineura cardariae Fedotova, 1994^{c g}
- Dasineura caricicola (Kieffer, 1913)^{i c g}
- Dasineura caricis (Kieffer, 1901)^{c g}
- Dasineura carpesii (Kieffer, 1909)^{c g}
- Dasineura carpophaga (Tripp, 1955)^{i c g}
- Dasineura cecconiana (Kieffer, 1909)^{c g}
- Dasineura cedri Coutin, 2000^{c g}
- Dasineura centaureae (Kieffer, 1909)^{c g}
- Dasineura cephalanthi (Felt, 1908)^{c g}
- Dasineura cerastii (Binnie, 1877)^{c g}
- Dasineura cerastiiflora Fedotova, 1993^{c g}
- Dasineura cercocarpi (Felt, 1913)^{i c g}
- Dasineura cereocarpi (Felt, 1913)^{c g}
- Dasineura chilensis (Kieffer & Herbst, 1909)^{c}
- Dasineura chinquapin (Beutenmuller, 1907)^{i c g}
- Dasineura chrysanthemi (Heath, 1962)^{c g}
- Dasineura chrysophyllae (Guercio, 1918)^{c g}
- Dasineura cirsioni (Felt, 1908)^{i c g}
- Dasineura citri (Rao & Grover, 1960)^{c g}
- Dasineura citrigemina Yang & Tang, 1991^{c g}
- Dasineura citrigemmia Yang & Tang, 1991^{c g}
- Dasineura clematidina (Kieffer, 1913)^{c g}
- Dasineura clematidis (Felt, 1908)^{i c g}
- Dasineura clematifolia Fedotova, 1985^{c g}
- Dasineura coffeae (Barnes, 1939)^{c g}
- Dasineura collinsoniae (Beutenmuller, 1908)^{i g}
- Dasineura columnae (Kieffer, 1909)^{c g}
- Dasineura communis (Felt, 1911)^{i c g b} (gouty vein midge)
- Dasineura comosae (Rübsaamen, 1916)^{c g}
- Dasineura consobrina (Felt, 1907)^{i g}
- Dasineura copacabanensis Maia, 1993^{c g}
- Dasineura copiosa Fedotova, 1996^{c g}
- Dasineura corniculata (Kieffer, 1909)^{c g}
- Dasineura corollae Gagne, 1977^{c g}
- Dasineura coronillae (Tavares, 1901)^{c g}
- Dasineura corticis (Felt, 1909)^{i c g}
- Dasineura corylina (Kieffer, 1913)^{c g}
- Dasineura cotini Janezic, 1979^{c g}
- Dasineura cotoneasteris Fedotova, 1990^{c g}
- Dasineura couepiae Maia, 2001^{c g}
- Dasineura crataegi (Winnertz, 1853)^{c g}
- Dasineura crataegibedeguar (Osten Sacken, 1878)^{i b}
- Dasineura cyanococci (Felt, 1907)^{i c g}
- Dasineura cystiphorae Fedotova, 1985^{c g}
- Dasineura cytisi (Kieffer, 1909)^{c g}
- Dasineura dactylidis (Metcalfe, 1933)^{c g}
- Dasineura daphnephila (Kieffer, 1909)^{c g}
- Dasineura daphnes (Kieffer, 1901)^{c g}
- Dasineura dentatae (Stebbins, 1910)^{i c g}
- Dasineura denticulata (Felt, 1907)^{i c g}
- Dasineura dianthi (Kieffer, 1909)^{c g}
- Dasineura dielsi (Rübsaamen, 1916)^{c g}
- Dasineura dioicae (Rübsaamen, 1895)^{c g}
- Dasineura dombrovskae Fedotova, 1985^{c g}
- Dasineura dryophila (Rübsaamen, 1917)^{c g}
- Dasineura dzhanokmenae Fedotova, 1994^{c g}
- Dasineura elatostemmae (Felt, 1921)^{c g}
- Dasineura elegans (Tavares, 1907)^{c g}
- Dasineura emilyae (Gagne, 1985)^{c g}
- Dasineura engstfeldi (Rübsaamen, 1889)^{c g}
- Dasineura epilobii (Low, 1889)^{c g}
- Dasineura ericaescopariae (Dufour, 1837)^{c g}
- Dasineura erigerontis (Rübsaamen, 1912)^{c g}
- Dasineura erodiicola Sylven, 1993^{c g}
- Dasineura erysimicola Fedotova, 1994^{c g}
- Dasineura eugeniae (Felt, 1912)^{i c g}
- Dasineura euphorbiarum (Kieffer, 1909)^{c g}
- Dasineura excavans (Kieffer, 1909)^{c g}
- Dasineura ezomatsue (Uchida & Inouye, 1954)^{c g}
- Dasineura fairmairei (Kieffer, 1897)^{c g}
- Dasineura fastidiosa Roskam, 1979^{c g}
- Dasineura fedtshenkoi Fedotova, 1984^{c g}
- Dasineura festucae (Barnes, 1939)^{c g}
- Dasineura filicae (Felt, 1907)^{i c g}
- Dasineura filiciae (Felt, 1907)^{c g}
- Dasineura filicina (Kieffer, 1889)^{c g}
- Dasineura filipendulae (Kieffer, 1909)^{c g}
- Dasineura fistulosa Kolesik, Adair & Eick, 2005^{c g}
- Dasineura flavescens (Felt, 1908)^{i c g}
- Dasineura flavicornis (Felt, 1908)^{i c g}
- Dasineura flavoabdominalis (Felt, 1908)^{i c g}
- Dasineura flavoscuta (Felt, 1908)^{i c g}
- Dasineura floralis (Marikovskij, 1956)^{c g}
- Dasineura florida (Felt, 1908)^{i c g}
- Dasineura foliumcrispans (Rübsaamen, 1895)^{c g}
- Dasineura folliculi (Felt, 1908)^{i c g}
- Dasineura frangulae (Kieffer, 1917)^{c g}
- Dasineura frauenfeldi Schiner, 1868^{g}
- Dasineura fraxinea (Kieffer, 1907)^{c g}
- Dasineura fraxini (Bremi, 1847)^{c g}
- Dasineura fraxinifolia (Felt, 1907)^{i c g}
- Dasineura fructicola (Kieffer, 1909)^{c g}
- Dasineura fructum (Rübsaamen, 1895)^{c g}
- Dasineura fulva (Felt, 1908)^{i c g}
- Dasineura fulvicola (Shinji, 1938)^{c g}
- Dasineura furcata Kolesik, Adair & Eick, 2005^{c g}
- Dasineura fusca (Rübsaamen, 1914)^{c g}
- Dasineura galeopsis (Kieffer, 1897)^{c g}
- Dasineura galiicola (Low, 1880)^{c g}
- Dasineura gallica (Kieffer, 1909)^{c g}
- Dasineura gardoquiae (Kieffer & Herbst, 1905)^{c g}
- Dasineura geisenheyneri (Kieffer, 1904)^{c g}
- Dasineura gemmae (Felt, 1909)^{i c g}
- Dasineura genistarum (Kieffer, 1909)^{c g}
- Dasineura gentianae (Kieffer, 1909)^{c g}
- Dasineura gentneri (Pritchard, 1953)^{i c g}
- Dasineura geranii (Kieffer, 1907)^{c g}
- Dasineura gibsoni (Felt, 1911)^{i c g}
- Dasineura gigantea Angelo & Maia, 1999^{c g}
- Dasineura giraudi (Frauenfeld, 1863)^{c g}
- Dasineura glandis (Felt, 1908)^{i c g}
- Dasineura glauca Kolesik, Adair & Eick, 2005^{c g}
- Dasineura glechomae (Kieffer, 1889)^{i c g}
- Dasineura gleditchiae (Osten Sacken, 1866)^{i c g b} (honeylocust podgall midge)
- Dasineura globosa Maia, 1996^{c g}
- Dasineura glomerata Kolesik, Adair & Eick, 2005^{c g}
- Dasineura glyciphyli (Rübsaamen, 1912)^{c g}
- Dasineura glycyrrhizicola Fedotova, 1985^{c g}
- Dasineura gmelinii Fedotova, 1992^{c g}
- Dasineura gossypii (Felt, 1916)^{c}
- Dasineura gracilicornis (Kieffer & Herbst, 1905)^{c g}
- Dasineura graminis (Felt, 1908)^{i c g}
- Dasineura grasseti (Barnes, 1935)^{c g}
- Dasineura halimii (Tavares, 1902)^{c g}
- Dasineura halimodendronifolia Fedotova, 1990^{c g}
- Dasineura harrisoni (Bagnall, 1922)^{c g}
- Dasineura hebefolia (Lamb, 1951)^{c g}
- Dasineura helenae Sylven, 1993^{c g}
- Dasineura helianthemiflorae Fedotova, 1991^{c g}
- Dasineura herminii (Tavares, 1902)^{c g}
- Dasineura hirticornis (Felt, 1909)^{i c g}
- Dasineura hisarenis Sharma & Singh, 1991^{c g}
- Dasineura hisarensis Sharma, 1991^{c g}
- Dasineura holosteae (Kieffer, 1909)^{c g}
- Dasineura hybanthi Kolesik & Skuhrava, 1997^{c g}
- Dasineura hygrophila (Mik, 1883)^{c g}
- Dasineura hyperici (Bremi, 1847)^{c g}
- Dasineura hyssopi (Kieffer, 1909)^{c g}
- Dasineura ilicis (Tavares, 1919)^{c g}
- Dasineura incola Fedotova, 1990^{c g}
- Dasineura inflata Stelter, 1986^{c g}
- Dasineura ingeris Sylven & Lovgren, 1995^{c g}
- Dasineura interbracta Roskam, 1979^{c g}
- Dasineura inventa Fedotova, 1996^{c g}
- Dasineura investita ^{b}
- Dasineura irregularis (Bremi, 1847)^{c g}
- Dasineura ivashenkoae Fedotova, 1996^{c g}
- Dasineura jaapi (Rübsaamen, 1914)^{c g}
- Dasineura jujubifolia Jiao & Bu^{g}
- Dasineura karnerensis (Felt, 1908)^{i c g}
- Dasineura kellneri (Henschel, 1875)^{c g}
- Dasineura kiefferi (Marchal, 1896)^{c g}
- Dasineura kiefferiana (Rübsaamen, 1891)^{c g}
- Dasineura kleini (Rübsaamen, 1892)^{c g}
- Dasineura koesterbecki Stelter, 1986^{c g}
- Dasineura kungeica Fedotova, 1993^{c g}
- Dasineura lamii (Kieffer, 1909)^{c g}
- Dasineura lamiicola (Mik, 1888)^{c g}
- Dasineura lappulae Fedotova, 1993^{c g}
- Dasineura lathierei (Guercio, 1910)^{c g}
- Dasineura lathyri (Kieffer, 1909)^{c g}
- Dasineura lathyricola (Rübsaamen, 1890)^{c g}
- Dasineura lathyrina (Rübsaamen, 1890)^{c g}
- Dasineura leguminicola (Lintner, 1879)^{i c g}
- Dasineura lenkiewicziae (Debski, 1918)^{c g}
- Dasineura lepidii (Felt, 1908)^{i c g}
- Dasineura lepidiis Fedotova, 1992^{c g}
- Dasineura ligulariae Fedotova, 1993^{c g}
- Dasineura lini (Barnes, 1936)^{c g}
- Dasineura linosyridis (Möhn, 1958)^{c g}
- Dasineura lithospermi (Loew, 1850)^{c g}
- Dasineura loewiana (Rübsaamen, 1917)^{c g}
- Dasineura loewii (Mik, 1882)^{c g}
- Dasineura loniceraegemmae Fedotova, 1991^{c g}
- Dasineura lotharingiae (Kieffer, 1888)^{c g}
- Dasineura lupini (Felt, 1916)^{i c g}
- Dasineura lupinorum Gagne, 1993^{c g}
- Dasineura lupulinae (Kieffer, 1891)^{c g}
- Dasineura luteofusca (Rondani, 1840)^{c g}
- Dasineura lysimachiae (Beutenmuller, 1907)^{i c g}
- Dasineura mali (Kieffer, 1904)^{i c g}
- Dasineura marginalis Maia, 2005^{c g}
- Dasineura marginata (Felt, 1908)^{i c g}
- Dasineura mariae Sylven, 1993^{c g}
- Dasineura maritima (Felt, 1909)^{i c g}
- Dasineura markakolica Fedotova, 1996^{c g}
- Dasineura medicaginis (Bremi, 1847)^{c g}
- Dasineura medullaris (Kieffer, 1892)^{c g}
- Dasineura meibomiae (Beutenmuller, 1907)^{i c g}
- Dasineura meliloti (Felt, 1907)^{i c g}
- Dasineura miki (Kieffer, 1909)^{c g}
- Dasineura mimosae (Kieffer, 1909)^{c g}
- Dasineura minardii (Stefani, 1913)^{c g}
- Dasineura minoterminalis (Stelter, 1969)^{c g}
- Dasineura minungula Stelter, 1986^{c g}
- Dasineura miranda Fedotova, 1996^{c g}
- Dasineura modesta (Felt, 1908)^{i c g}
- Dasineura mojynkumensis Fedotova, 1994^{c g}
- Dasineura multiannulata (Felt, 1908)^{i c g}
- Dasineura multianulata (Felt, 1908)^{c}
- Dasineura myosotidis (Kieffer, 1902)^{c g}
- Dasineura myrciariae Maia, 1996^{c g}
- Dasineura myrtylli (Rübsaamen, 1916)^{c g}
- Dasineura nasturtii (Rübsaamen, 1916)^{c g}
- Dasineura nervicola (Kieffer, 1909)^{c g}
- Dasineura nipponica (Inouye, 1966)^{c g}
- Dasineura nodosa (Felt, 1907)^{i c g}
- Dasineura nummulariifoliae Fedotova, 1996^{c g}
- Dasineura obscura (Rondani, 1840)^{c g}
- Dasineura odoratae Stelter, 1982^{c g}
- Dasineura oldfieldii Kolesik, Adair & Eick, 2005^{c g}
- Dasineura oleae (Low, 1885)^{c g}
- Dasineura oshanesii Kolesik, Adair & Eick, 2005^{c g}
- Dasineura oxyacanthae (Rübsaamen, 1914)^{c g}
- Dasineura oxycoccana (Johnson, 1899)^{i c g}
- Dasineura oxytropifolia Fedotova, 1984^{c g}
- Dasineura oxytropigemma Fedotova, 1984^{c g}
- Dasineura paeoniae Fedotova, 1989^{c g}
- Dasineura pallasi Fedotova, 1996^{c g}
- Dasineura panteli (Kieffer, 1909)^{c g}
- Dasineura papaveris (Winnertz, 1853)^{c g}
- Dasineura papivora Grover & Prasad, 1966^{c g}
- Dasineura parthenocissi (Stebbins, 1910)^{i c g b}
- Dasineura pedalis (Felt, 1908)^{i c g}
- Dasineura pediculariflorae Fedotova, 2005^{c g}
- Dasineura peinei (Rübsaamen, 1890)^{c g}
- Dasineura pellex (Osten Sacken, 1862)^{i c g b} (ash bullet gall midge)
- Dasineura pentaphylloidiflora Fedotova, 1990^{c g}
- Dasineura pergandei (Felt, 1911)^{i c g}
- Dasineura periclymeni (Rübsaamen, 1889)^{c g}
- Dasineura perigonialis Fedotova, 1996^{c g}
- Dasineura peyerimhoffi (Kieffer, 1919)^{c g}
- Dasineura phlomicola (Kovalev, 1967)^{c g}
- Dasineura phyteumatis (Low, 1885)^{c g}
- Dasineura piceae (Felt, 1926)^{i c g}
- Dasineura pilifera Kolesik, Adair & Eick, 2005^{c g}
- Dasineura pilosa ^{b}
- Dasineura pini (Felt, 1907)^{i c g}
- Dasineura piperitae (Felt, 1908)^{i c g}
- Dasineura pirolae (Kieffer, 1909)^{c g}
- Dasineura plectranthi (Kovalev, 1967)^{c g}
- Dasineura plicata (Felt, 1908)^{i c g}
- Dasineura plicatrix (Loew, 1850)^{c g}
- Dasineura poae (Muhle, 1957)^{c g}
- Dasineura polygalae (Kieffer, 1909)^{c g}
- Dasineura populeti (Rübsaamen, 1889)^{c g}
- Dasineura populicola (Marikovskij, 1957)^{c g}
- Dasineura populnea (Kieffer, 1909)^{c g}
- Dasineura porrecta (Felt, 1915)^{i g}
- Dasineura potentillae (Wachtl, 1885)^{c g}
- Dasineura potentillaeflora Fedotova, 2005^{c g}
- Dasineura praecox Gagne, 1996^{c g}
- Dasineura pratensis (Kieffer, 1909)^{c g}
- Dasineura praticola (Kieffer, 1892)^{c g}
- Dasineura procera (Rübsaamen, 1914)^{c g}
- Dasineura proxima (Guercio, 1918)^{c g}
- Dasineura prunicola (Low, 1889)^{c g}
- Dasineura pseudacaciae (Fitch, 1859)^{i c g}
- Dasineura pseudococcus (Thomas, 1890)^{c g}
- Dasineura psoraleae Sharma, 1987^{c g}
- Dasineura pteridicola (Kieffer, 1901)^{c g}
- Dasineura pteridis (Muller, 1871)^{c g}
- Dasineura pudibunda (Osten Sacken, 1862)^{i c g b}
- Dasineura pulsatillae (Kieffer, 1894)^{c g}
- Dasineura pulvini (Kieffer, 1891)^{c g}
- Dasineura purpurea (Felt, 1908)^{i c g}
- Dasineura pustulans (Rübsaamen, 1889)^{c g}
- Dasineura pyri (Bouche, 1847)^{i c g}
- Dasineura quercina (Felt, 1907)^{i c g}
- Dasineura racemi (Felt, 1908)^{c g}
- Dasineura rachiphaga (Tripp, 1955)^{c g}
- Dasineura radifolii (Felt, 1909)^{i c g}
- Dasineura ranunculi (Bremi, 1847)^{c g}
- Dasineura rapunculi (Kieffer, 1906)^{c g}
- Dasineura rhododendri (Kieffer, 1909)^{c g}
- Dasineura rhodophaga (Coquillett, 1900)^{i c g}
- Dasineura rhois (Coquillett, 1900)^{i c g}
- Dasineura ribis (Barnes, 1940)^{c g}
- Dasineura rileyana (Felt, 1909)^{i c g}
- Dasineura rosarum (Hardy, 1850)^{i c g}
- Dasineura rosmarini Tavares, 1902^{c g}
- Dasineura rossi (Rübsaamen, 1914)^{c g}
- Dasineura rostratae Stelter, 1992^{c g}
- Dasineura rozhkovi (Mamaev & Nikolskiy, 1983)^{c g}
- Dasineura rubella (Kieffer, 1896)^{c g}
- Dasineura rubiflorae (Felt, 1908)^{i c g}
- Dasineura rubiformis Kolesik, Adair & Eick, 2005^{c g}
- Dasineura ruebsaameni (Kieffer, 1909)^{c g}
- Dasineura rufescens (Stefani, 1898)^{c g}
- Dasineura rufipedalis (Felt, 1908)^{i c g}
- Dasineura rumicicola (Rübsaamen, 1914)^{c g}
- Dasineura salicifolia (Felt, 1907)^{i c g}
- Dasineura salicifoliae (Osten Sacken, 1866)^{i c g b}
- Dasineura salviae (Kieffer, 1909)^{c g}
- Dasineura sampaina (Tavares, 1902)^{c g}
- Dasineura sanguisorbae (Rübsaamen, 1890)^{c g}
- Dasineura sassafras (Felt, 1916)^{i c g}
- Dasineura saurica Fedotova, 1993^{c g}
- Dasineura saussureae Fedotova, 1996^{c g}
- Dasineura saxifragae (Kieffer, 1892)^{c g}
- Dasineura schulzei (Kieffer, 1917)^{c g}
- Dasineura scirpi (Kieffer, 1898)^{c}
- Dasineura scorpii (Kieffer, 1909)^{c g}
- Dasineura scorsonerae Fedotova, 1982^{c g}
- Dasineura scorzonerifloris Fedotova, 1996^{c g}
- Dasineura scutata (Felt, 1908)^{i c g}
- Dasineura sedicola (Kovalev, 1967)^{c g}
- Dasineura semenivora (Beutenmuller, 1907)^{i c g}
- Dasineura senebrierae (Kieffer, 1909)^{c g}
- Dasineura seneciocola Fedotova, 1998^{c g}
- Dasineura senecioflora Fedotova, 1993^{c g}
- Dasineura senecionis (Rübsaamen, 1925)^{c}
- Dasineura serotina (Winnertz, 1853)^{c g}
- Dasineura serrulatae (Osten Sacken, 1862)^{i c g b}
- Dasineura sesami Grover & Prasad, 1966^{c g}
- Dasineura setosa (Felt, 1907)^{i c g}
- Dasineura severzovi Fedotova, 1996^{c g}
- Dasineura shinjii Skuhrava, 1986^{c g}
- Dasineura sibirica (Marikovskij, 1962)^{c g}
- Dasineura silvestrii (Trotter, 1911)^{i g}
- Dasineura silvestris (Kieffer, 1909)^{c g}
- Dasineura silvicola (Kieffer, 1909)^{c g}
- Dasineura similis (Löw, 1888)^{c g}
- Dasineura simillima (Kieffer, 1913)^{i c g}
- Dasineura sisymbrii (Schrank, 1803)^{c g}
- Dasineura smilacifolia (Felt, 1911)^{i c g}
- Dasineura smilacinae (Bishop, 1911)^{i c g}
- Dasineura socialis (Kieffer, 1909)^{c g}
- Dasineura sodalis (Low, 1877)^{c g}
- Dasineura solonaica Fedotova, 1996^{c g}
- Dasineura soongarica Fedotova, 1994^{c g}
- Dasineura spadicea (Rübsaamen, 1917)^{c g}
- Dasineura sphaerophysae Fedotova, 1983^{c g}
- Dasineura spiraeae (Loiselle, 1912)^{c g}
- Dasineura spiraeina (Felt, 1908)^{i c g}
- Dasineura squamosa (Tavares, 1919)^{c g}
- Dasineura stanleyae (Cockerell, 1914)^{i c g}
- Dasineura stellariae (Rübsaamen, 1916)^{c g}
- Dasineura stelteri Gagne, 2004^{c g}
- Dasineura storozhenkoi Fedotova, 2003^{c g}
- Dasineura strobilina (Bremi, 1847)^{c g}
- Dasineura strumosa (Bremi, 1847)^{c g}
- Dasineura subinermis (Kieffer & Herbst, 1911)^{c g}
- Dasineura subterranea (Kieffer, 1909)^{c g}
- Dasineura sulcata Kolesik, Adair & Eick, 2005^{c g}
- Dasineura swainei (Felt, 1914)^{i c g}
- Dasineura symphyti (Rübsaamen, 1892)^{c g}
- Dasineura syreniae Fedotova, 1994^{c g}
- Dasineura szepligetii (Kieffer, 1909)^{c g}
- Dasineura tamaricicarpa Fedotova, 1983^{c g}
- Dasineura tamaricicola Fedotova, 1983^{c g}
- Dasineura tamariciflora Fedotova, 1983^{c g}
- Dasineura tanaitica Fedotova, 1992^{c g}
- Dasineura tavaresi Maia, 1996^{c g}
- Dasineura tavolga Fedotova, 2002^{c g}
- Dasineura tetensi (Rübsaamen, 1892)^{c g}
- Dasineura tetragynae (Debski, 1918)^{c g}
- Dasineura tetrahit (Kieffer, 1909)^{c g}
- Dasineura tetrastigma (Felt, 1927)^{c g}
- Dasineura teucrii (Tavares, 1903)^{c g}
- Dasineura theobromae Maia & Vasguez, 2006^{c g}
- Dasineura thlaspicarpae Fedotova, 1990^{c g}
- Dasineura thomasi (Kieffer, 1909)^{c g}
- Dasineura thomasiana (Kieffer, 1888)^{c g}
- Dasineura tiliae (Schrank, 1803)^{c g}
- Dasineura tjanshanica Fedotova, 2003^{c g}
- Dasineura torontoensis (Felt, 1914)^{i c g}
- Dasineura tortilis (Bremi, 1847)^{c g}
- Dasineura tortrix (Low, 1877)^{c g}
- Dasineura toweri (Felt, 1909)^{i c g}
- Dasineura tragonopogonicola Fedotova, 1996^{c g}
- Dasineura tragopogonicola Fedotova, 1995^{c g}
- Dasineura traili (Kieffer, 1909)^{c g}
- Dasineura trifolii Loew, 1874^{i c g b} (clover leaf midge)
- Dasineura tripolii (Neacs(with line beneath)u, 1968)^{c g}
- Dasineura triseti (Barnes, 1939)^{c g}
- Dasineura trotteri (Tavares, 1902)^{c g}
- Dasineura tuba (Stebbins, 1910)^{c g}
- Dasineura tubicoloides Gagne, 2004^{c g}
- Dasineura tubularis (Kieffer, 1909)^{c g}
- Dasineura tumidosae (Felt, 1908)^{i c g b}
- Dasineura turgenica Fedotova, 1993^{c g}
- Dasineura turionum (Kieffer & Trotter, 1904)^{c g}
- Dasineura tympani (Kieffer, 1909)^{c g}
- Dasineura ulicis (Kieffer, 1909)^{c g}
- Dasineura ulmaria (Bremi, 1847)^{c g}
- Dasineura ulmea (Felt, 1908)^{i c g}
- Dasineura ulmicola (Kieffer, 1909)^{c g}
- Dasineura umbrosa (Kieffer, 1909)^{c g}
- Dasineura urnicola (Osten Sacken, 1875)^{i g}
- Dasineura urticae (Perris, 1840)^{c g}
- Dasineura vagans (Kieffer, 1909)^{c g}
- Dasineura valerianae (Kieffer, 1909)^{c g}
- Dasineura vallisumbrosae (Kieffer, 1904)^{c g}
- Dasineura verbasci (Kieffer, 1909)^{c g}
- Dasineura vernalis (Felt, 1908)^{i c g}
- Dasineura verrucosa (Guercio, 1918)^{c g}
- Dasineura viciae (Kieffer, 1888)^{c g}
- Dasineura vicicola (Tavares, 1905)^{c g}
- Dasineura vincae (Kieffer & Trotter, 1904)^{c g}
- Dasineura violae (Low, 1880)^{c g}
- Dasineura violahirtae Stelter, 1982^{c g}
- Dasineura virgaeaureae (Liebel, 1889)^{c g}
- Dasineura vitis (Felt, 1908)^{i c g}
- Dasineura vitisidaea (Kieffer, 1909)^{c g}
- Dasineura volantis Gagne, 0000^{i c g}
- Dasineura vulgatiformiae Sylven, 1998^{c g}
- Dasineura wahlenbergiae Kolesik, 1998^{c g}
- Dasineura weigelaefolia (Kovalev, 1967)^{c g}
- Dasineura wistariae (Mani, 1954)^{c g}
- Dasineura xylostei (Kieffer, 1909)^{c g}
- Dasineura zillae (Kieffer, 1909)^{c g}
- Dasineura zimmermanni (Tavares, 1901)^{c g}

Data sources: i = ITIS, c = Catalogue of Life, g = GBIF, b = Bugguide.net
