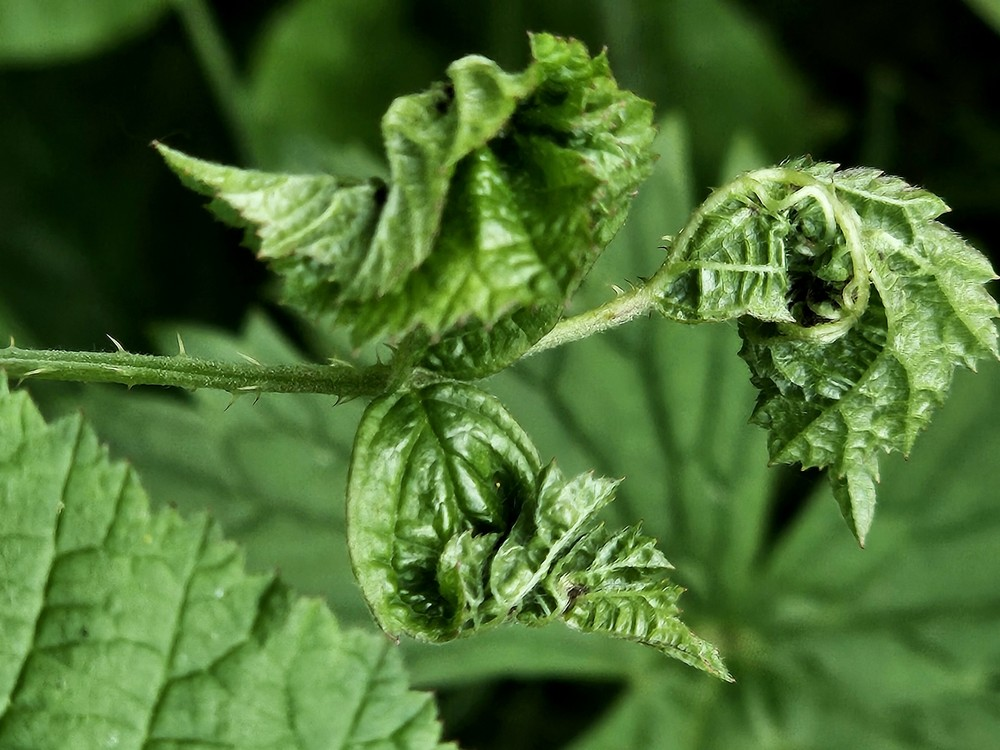

Scientific classification
- Kingdom: Animalia
- Phylum: Arthropoda
- Clade: Pancrustacea
- Class: Insecta
- Order: Diptera
- Family: Cecidomyiidae
- Genus: Dasineura
- Species: D. plicatrix

Binomial name
- Dasineura plicatrix (Loew, 1850)

Synonyms
- Cecidomyia plicatrix Loew, 1850

= Dasineura plicatrix =

Species of fly

Dasineura plicatrix is a species of gall midge, an insect in the family Cecidomyiidae, found in Europe. It was described by the German entomologist Friedrich Hermann Loew in 1850. The larvaae feed within the tissue of bramble leaves, creating an abnormal growth known as a plant gall.

== Description ==
Signs of Dasineura plicatrix are contorted, young bramble leaves, which are found in the spring and early summer. The leaves can be creased, pleated or pluckered, with thickened veins, and conspicuous black staining around the gall. The white larvae can be found until early summer when they drop out of the galls and pupate in the soil. There is disagreement in the literature as to whether there is a single generation a year or several per year. The gall is often overlooked as just a crumpled leaf.

Galls have been found on the following species,

- Rubus caesius – European dewberry
- Rubus canescens
- Rubus fruticosus – blackberry
- Rubus gracilis
- Rubus hirtus
- Rubus idaeus – raspberry
- Rubus plicatus
- Rubus ulmifolius – elmleaf blackberry
- Rubus vestitus

== Distribution ==
Found in Europe, it is common in Great Britain.

== Inquiline ==
Lestodiplosis plicatricis is an inquiline; a lodger or tenant of Dasineura plicatrix and live in the gall.
