= Dasineura serrulatae =

Scientific classification
- Domain: Eukaryota
- Kingdom: Animalia
- Phylum: Arthropoda
- Class: Insecta
- Order: Diptera
- Family: Cecidomyiidae
- Genus: Dasineura
- Species: D. serrulatae

Binomial name
- Dasineura serrulatae (Osten Sacken, 1862)

Synonyms
- Cecidomyia serrulatae Osten Sacken, 1862

Species of fly

Dasineura serrulatae is a species of gall midges, insects in the family Cecidomyiidae.
