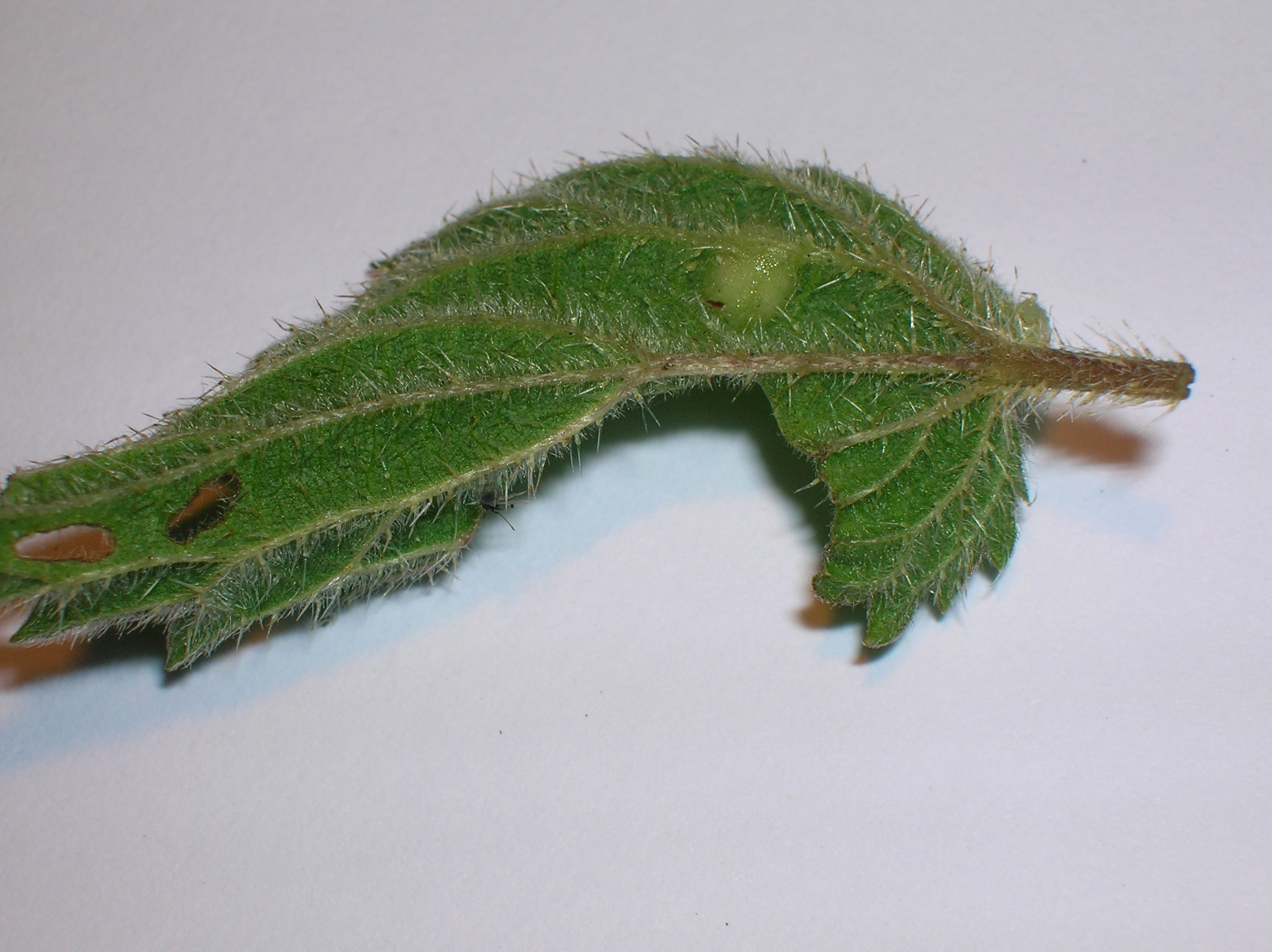
- Pouch gall on a leaf vein

Scientific classification
- Kingdom: Animalia
- Phylum: Arthropoda
- Class: Insecta
- Order: Diptera
- Family: Cecidomyiidae
- Genus: Dasineura
- Species: D. urticae

Binomial name
- Dasineura urticae (Perris, 1840)

= Dasineura urticae =

Species of fly

The nettle pouch gall develops in leaf veins, leaf petioles, flower stalks and sometimes the stem of Urtica dioica (and less commonly Urtica urens). This structure is caused by the gall midge Dasineura urticae, sometimes misspelled Dasyneura urticae. Obsolete synonyms are Perrisia urticae and Cecidomyia urticae.

== Physical appearance of the galls ==
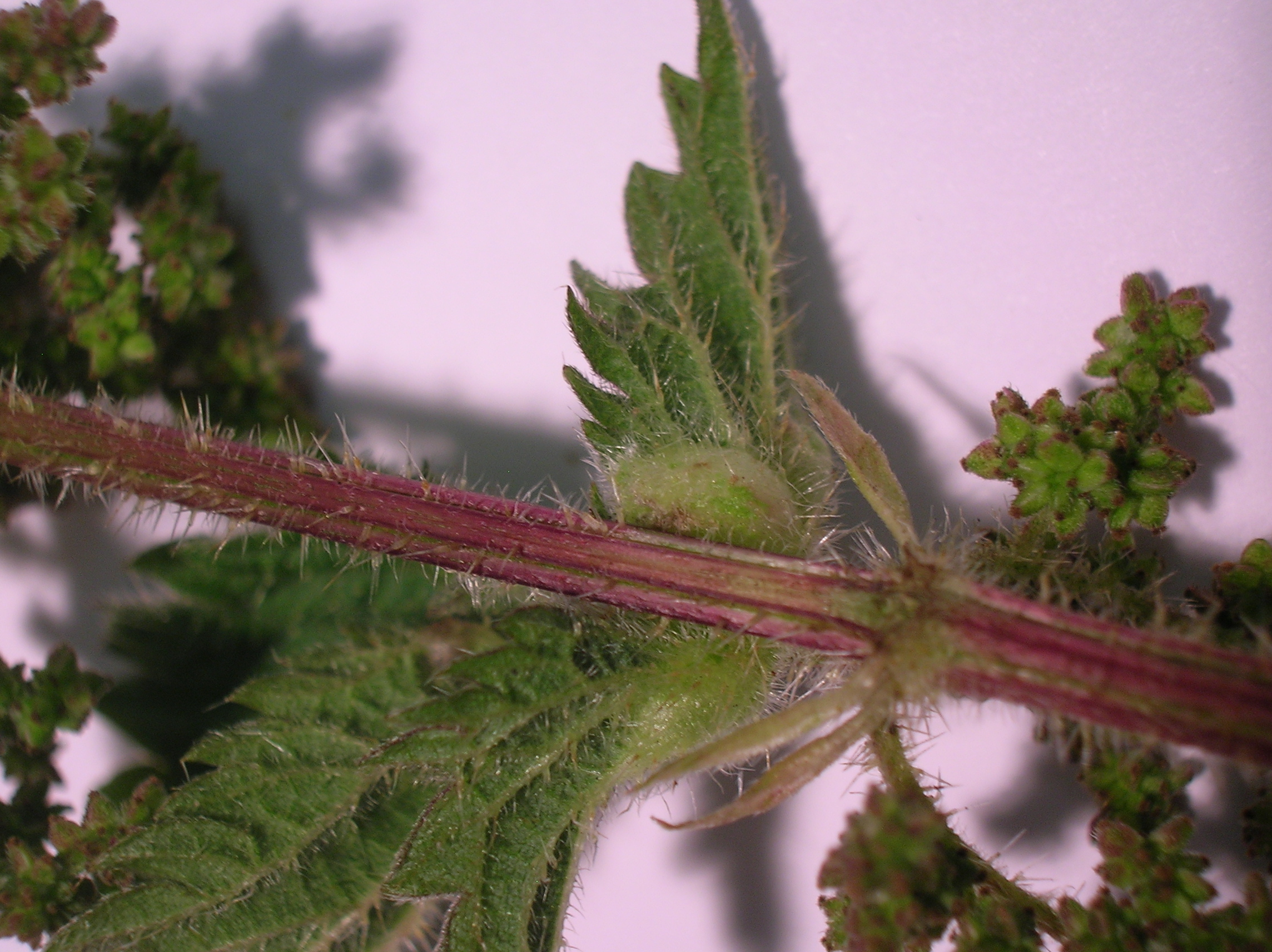
Pouch gall on nettle petiole

The galls are irregularly shaped, smooth, often shiny, and coloured from purplish to pale green, exhibiting thickened walls, with a narrow slit-shaped opening, normally on the underside. The size is from 3–8 mm. A number of galls are often found next to each other on the same or different plant structures, and they may coalesce. The galls are mainly found around the growing apex and exhibit a wide range of forms, dependent on the organ in which they are situated.

== Life-cycle ==
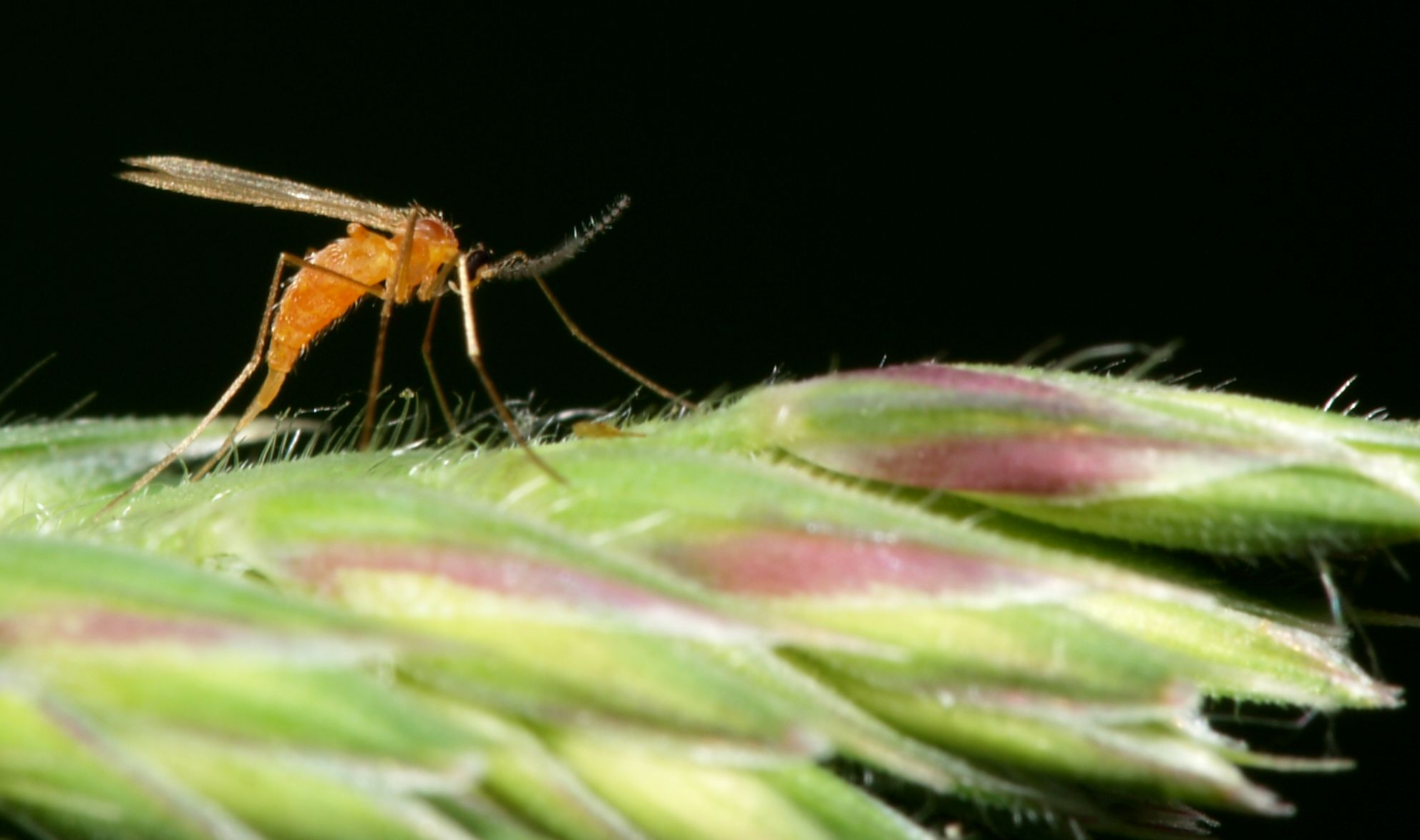
A typical cecidomyiid laying eggs on grass

White larvae live gregariously in each gall, feeding upon the plant cell contents. The first generation galls are seen in spring. When larvae reach maturity, they leave the gall to pupate in the soil. Two or more generations per year are common. The last generation in autumn hibernates in the soil as larvae, pupate in spring and emerge as adults to start the next spring generation.

== Predators and inquilines ==
Sometimes larvae of other gall midge species are found in the galls together with larvae of the gall inducer. They may be inquilines, such as the obligate associate Ametrodiplosis urticae, or they may be predators, such as Lestodiplosis urticae.

== Distribution ==
The nettle pouch gall has a Eurosiberian distribution. It is widely distributed in Central and Western Europe, but the distribution extends into Southern Siberia.
