= Dasineura crataegibedeguar =

Scientific classification
- Domain: Eukaryota
- Kingdom: Animalia
- Phylum: Arthropoda
- Class: Insecta
- Order: Diptera
- Family: Cecidomyiidae
- Supertribe: Lasiopteridi
- Tribe: Oligotrophini
- Genus: Dasineura
- Species: D. crataegibedeguar

Binomial name
- Dasineura crataegibedeguar (Osten Sacken, 1878)

Synonyms
- Cecidomyia crataegibedeguar Osten Sacken, 1878

Species of fly

Dasineura crataegibedeguar is a species of gall midges in the family Cecidomyiidae.
