= Dasineura acrophila =

Scientific classification
- Kingdom: Animalia
- Phylum: Arthropoda
- Class: Insecta
- Order: Diptera
- Family: Cecidomyiidae
- Genus: Dasineura
- Species: D. acrophila

Binomial name
- Dasineura acrophila (Winnertz), 1853

Synonyms
- Cecidomyia acrophila Winnertz, 1853

Species of fly

Dasineura acrophila is a gall midge which forms galls on the leaves of ash (Fraxinus species). It was first described by Johannes Winnertz in 1853 and is found in Europe.

== Appearance of the gall ==
Part of the leaflet is thickened and folded upwards to form a pod. It contains, up to twenty white larvae in late spring and early summer, or the remains of skin casts and faeces after the larvae have left.

Species of ash galled, include white ash or American ash (Fraxinus americana), narrow-leafed ash (Fraxinus angustifolia & subsp. oxycarpa), Bunge's ash (Fraxinus bungeana), common ash (Fraxinus excelsior), manna ash (Fraxinus ornus) and Pallis' ash (Fraxinus pallisiae).
