= Dasineura balsamifera =

Scientific classification
- Kingdom: Animalia
- Phylum: Arthropoda
- Clade: Pancrustacea
- Class: Insecta
- Order: Diptera
- Family: Cecidomyiidae
- Genus: Dasineura
- Species: D. balsamifera

Binomial name
- Dasineura balsamifera (Felt, 1908)

Species of insect

Dasineura balsamifera are a species of midges in the family Cecidomyiidae. They are an inquiline of Paradiplosis tumifex.
