= Dasineura swainei =

Spruce bud midge
- Adult female ovipositing on a spruce bud in June
- Gall on a black spruce

Scientific classification
- Kingdom: Animalia
- Phylum: Arthropoda
- Clade: Pancrustacea
- Class: Insecta
- Order: Diptera
- Family: Cecidomyiidae
- Genus: Dasineura
- Species: D. swainei

Binomial name
- Dasineura swainei (Felt, 1914)

Synonyms
- Dasyneura swainei (Felt, 1914); Rhabdophaga swainei Felt, 1914

Species of gall-causing fly

Dasineura swainei, the spruce bud midge, is a species of gall midge found in Canada and Alaska.

== Taxonomy ==
The spruce bud midge was first scientifically described under the name Rhabdophaga swainei in a 1914 paper by American entomologist Ephraim Porter Felt published in The Ottawa Naturalist. Felt reported a new species of midge "reared by Mr. J. M. Swaine, Ottawa, Canada, the latter part of May, 1914, from spruce bud galls" and provided a physical description of the galls and male and female adult midges. This classification was accepted until a 1980s reevaluation of the genus Rabdophaga culminated in its synonymy with Dasineura. A 1981 paper in a supplement to Entomologica Scandinavica investigated the morphometry and allometry of certain Oligotrophini, including species of Dasineura and Rhabdophaga. Among the authors' conclusions was that "one of the main features used in previous attempts to distinguish this latter genus [Rhabdophaga] from Dasineura ... does not in this case constitute an adequate separating character." The 1981 paper did not suggest any taxonomic changes, but a later (1986) paper went ahead and listed Rabdophaga [sic] as a synonym of Dasineura. The synonymy proved contentious and was subjected to much discussion until a late 1990s revision partially restored the genus Rabdophaga, placing willow-pests back into that genus, and keeping other species in Dasineura, including D. swainei. The species' type material is in the collections of the New York State Museum. In English, it is commonly known as the "spruce bud midge", a name dating back to at least 1917 in Felt's own Key to American Insect Galls. In French, its common name is the "cécidomyie de l'épinette".

The spruce bud midge is a species of Dasineura, of the tribe Oligotrophini in the subfamily Cecidomyiinae of the gall midge family (Cecidomyiidae).

Freshly-emerged adult female on black spruce

== Galls, significance, and control ==
Spruce bud midge galls in the terminal bud of developing spruce trees can cause the tree to branch and produce multiple leaders instead of one. Albertan CFS entomologist Herbert F. Cerezke studied this phenomenon in a 1972 paper published in The Canadian Entomologist; later, in 1990, another CFS entomologist, Newfoundlander Rick J. West, studied the distribution and effect of galls on black spruce.

A study reported in the 1988 Journal of the Entomological Society of British Columbia tested the efficacy of two insecticides, fenvalerate and acephate on Dasineura swainei at three different concentrations of aqueous solutions. The authors found that only one test "provided significant protection", fenvalerate at its highest-tested concentration (0.025%). Fenvalerate is moderately toxic to mammals and is highly ecotoxic; it is considered a highly hazardous pesticide. Fenvalerate products have been discontinued for use in Canada and the United States since the 2000s.

A D. swainei gall on this white spruce's terminal bud caused it to branch.

== Distribution and hosts ==
Scientifically discovered in the Ottawa area, Dasineura swainei is now understood to be found throughout boreal Canada, as far north as the Yukon and the Northwest Territories and northwest into the U.S. state of Alaska, mainly in the south and the interior. Spruce bud midges have been the subject of scientific studies in Newfoundland, central Alberta, and interior British Columbia.

The midges attack different species of spruce (Picea spp.) throughout their range. They are most abundant on P. mariana (black spruce) and P. glauca (white spruce), both found throughout boreal Canada and non-coastal Alaska, but have also been cited to infest:

- Picea abies (Norway spruce, introduced to Eastern Canada)
- Picea pungens (blue spruce, planted ornamentally in Canada)
- Picea rubens (red spruce, Ontario to Nova Scotia)
- Picea sitchensis (sitka spruce, coastal B.C. and Alaska)
- Picea engelmanni (Engelmann spruce, interior B.C. and western Alberta)

== Bibliography ==
- Cerezke, H. F. (June 1972). "Observations on the distribution of the spruce bud midge (Rhabdophaga swainei Felt) in black and white spruce crowns and Its effect on height growth". Canadian Journal of Forest Research. 2 (2): 69–72. Bibcode:1972CaJFR...2...69C. doi:10.1139/x72-015.
- Clark, J. (March 1952). "The Spruce Bud Midge, Rhabdophaga swainei Felt (Cecidomyiidae: Diptera)". The Canadian Entomologist. 84 (3): 87–9. doi:10.4039/Ent8487-3.
- West, R. J. (1990). "The biology, damage and within-tree distribution on the spruce bud midge on black spruce in Newfoundland" (PDF). Phytoprotection. 71 (1): 31–6. Bibcode:1990PhytP..71...31W. doi:10.7202/705980ar.

=== Auxiliary sources ===
- Farrar, John Laird (2017) [Copyright 1995]. Trees in Canada. Natural Resources Canada; Canadian Forest Service; Fitzhenry & Whiteside. ISBN 978-1-55455-406-5.
- Gagné, Raymond J.; Jaschhof, Mathias (2021). A Catalog of the Cecidomyiidae (Diptera) of the World (PDF) (5th ed.). Systematic Entomology Laboratory, Agricultural Research Service, U.S. Department of Agriculture; U.S. National Museum. ISBN 978-0-9863941-3-3.
- Sylvén, Edvard; Carlbäcker, Urban (1 July 1981). "Morphometric studies on Oligotrophini adults (Diptera: Cecidomyiidae) including an attempt to correct for allometric deviations". In Cederhom, Lennart (ed.). Advances in insect systematics and phylogeny. Entomologica Scandinavica. Supplement 15. Lund, Sweden: Scandinavian Society of Entomology. pp. 185–210.
