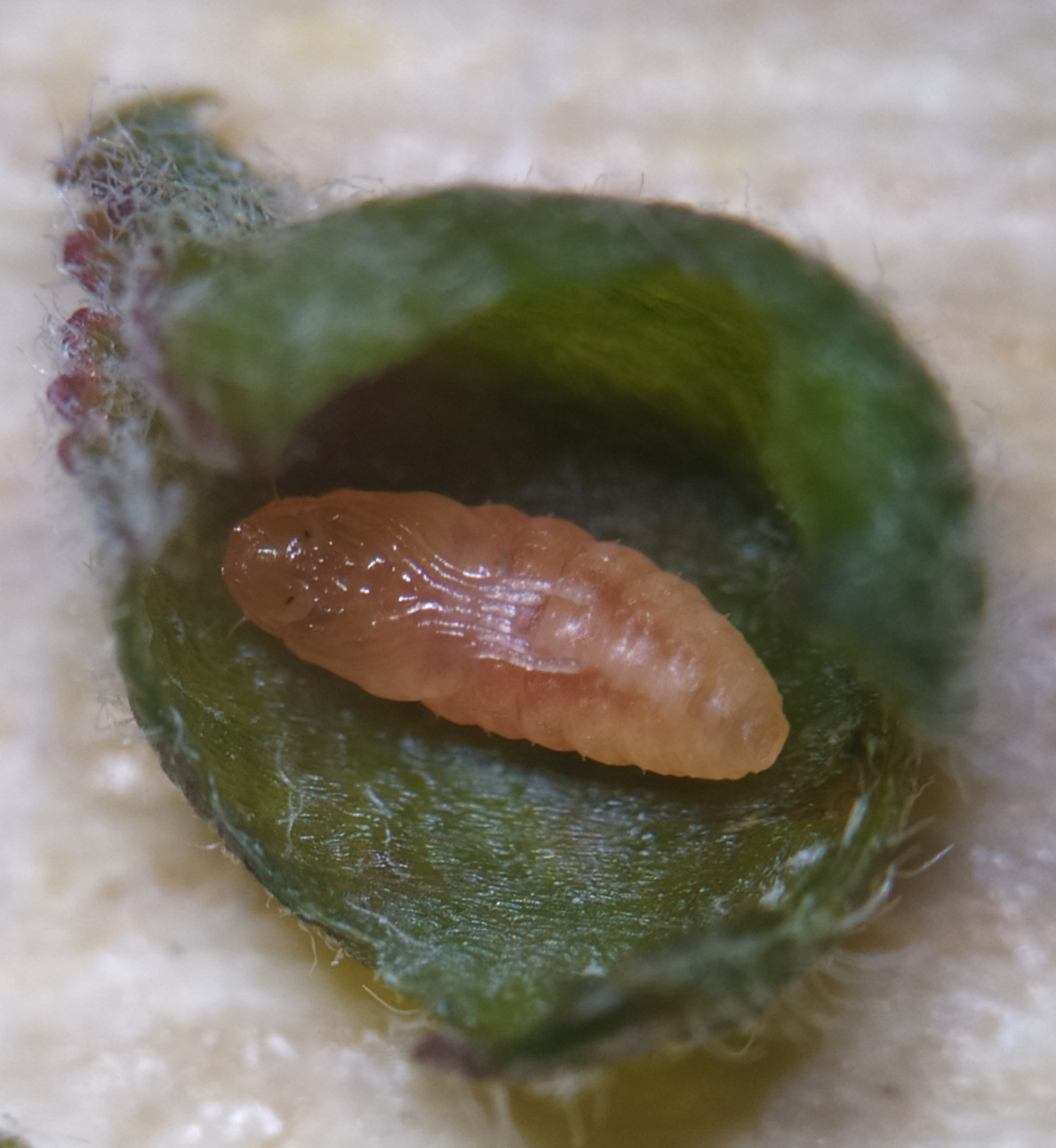

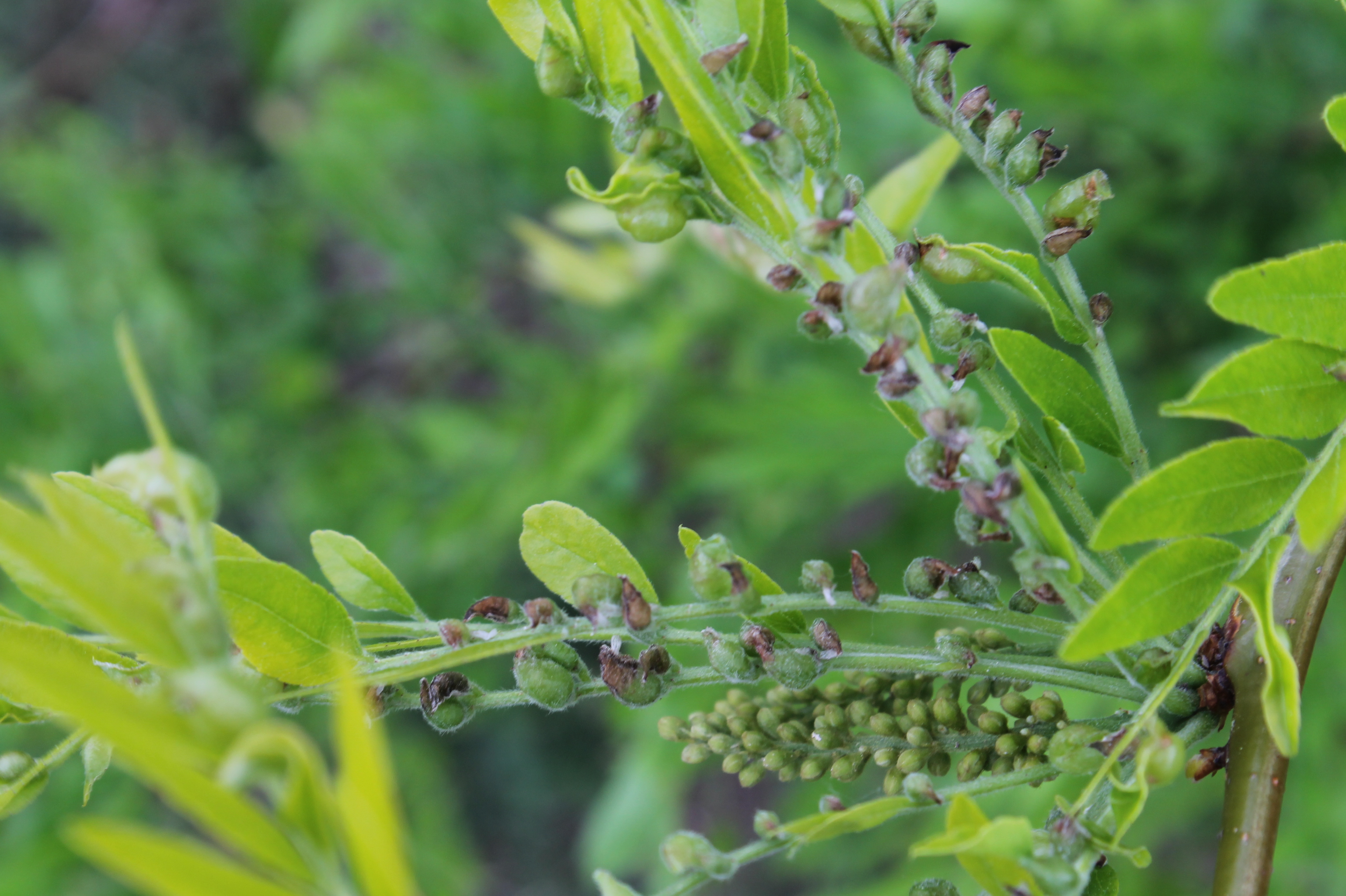
- Pupa (top) and galls caused by Dasineura gleditchiae on the foliage of honey locust (bottom)

Scientific classification
- Domain: Eukaryota
- Kingdom: Animalia
- Phylum: Arthropoda
- Class: Insecta
- Order: Diptera
- Family: Cecidomyiidae
- Genus: Dasineura
- Species: D. gleditchiae

Binomial name
- Dasineura gleditchiae (Osten Sacken, 1866)

Synonyms
- Cecidomyia gleditchiae Osten Sacken, 1866

= Dasineura gleditchiae =

Species of fly

Dasineura gleditchiae, commonly known as the honeylocust podgall midge, is a species of gall midge in the family Cecidomyiidae. Native to North America, it is an invasive species in parts of Europe. The honeylocust podgall midge is a pest of honey locust, forming galls on the foliage.
