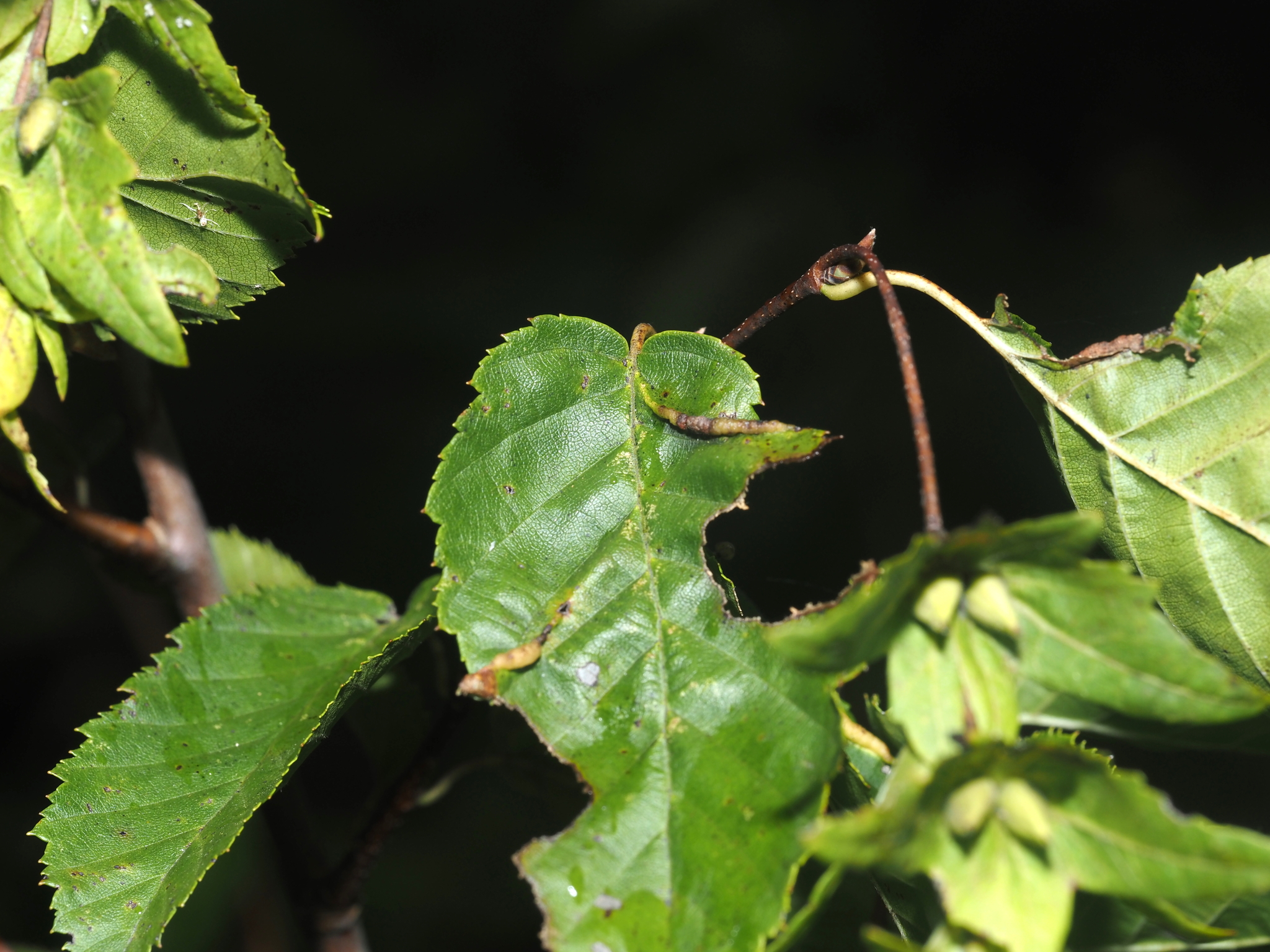
- Dasineura pudibunda

Scientific classification
- Kingdom: Animalia
- Phylum: Arthropoda
- Clade: Pancrustacea
- Class: Insecta
- Order: Diptera
- Family: Cecidomyiidae
- Genus: Dasineura
- Species: D. pudibunda

Binomial name
- Dasineura pudibunda (Osten Sacken, 1862)

Synonyms
- Cecidomyia pudibunda Osten Sacken, 1862

= Dasineura pudibunda =

Species of fly

Dasineura pudibunda is a species of gall midges, insects in the family Cecidomyiidae.
