= Dasineura parthenocissi =

Scientific classification
- Domain: Eukaryota
- Kingdom: Animalia
- Phylum: Arthropoda
- Class: Insecta
- Order: Diptera
- Family: Cecidomyiidae
- Genus: Dasineura
- Species: D. parthenocissi

Binomial name
- Dasineura parthenocissi (Stebbins, 1910)

Synonyms
- Cecidomyia parthenocissi Stebbins, 1910

Species of fly

Dasineura parthenocissi is a species of gall midge, insects in the family Cecidomyiidae. It forms galls on Parthenocissus quinquefolia. The gall can host the parasitic wasp Platygaster munita.
