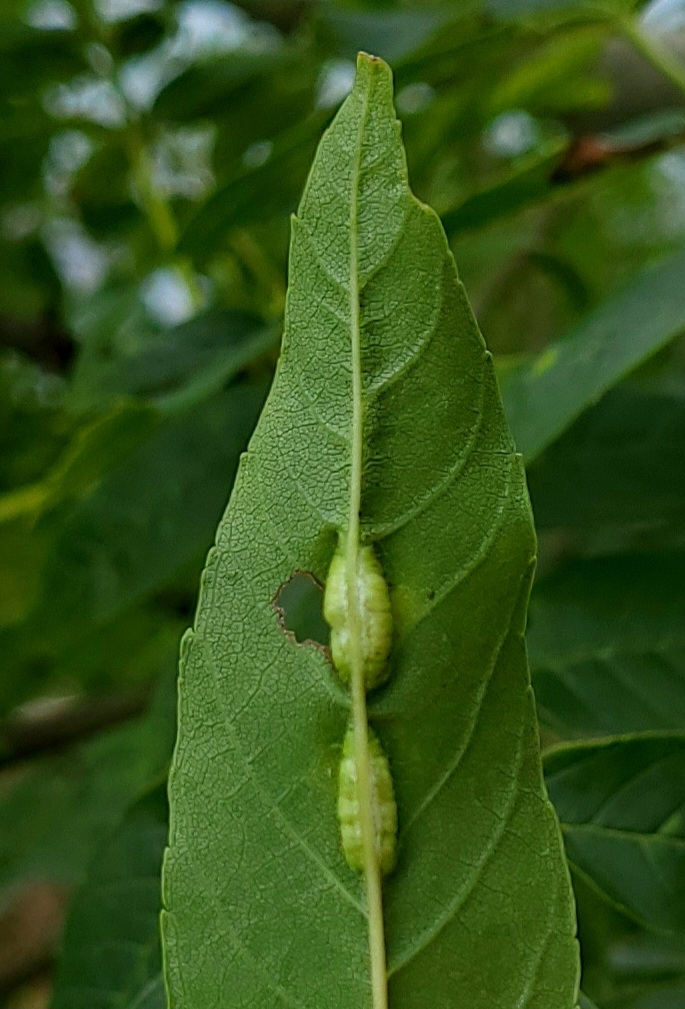
- Galls on Fraxinus excelsior

Scientific classification
- Kingdom: Animalia
- Phylum: Arthropoda
- Class: Insecta
- Order: Diptera
- Family: Cecidomyiidae
- Genus: Dasineura
- Species: D. fraxini

Binomial name
- Dasineura fraxini Bremi, 1847

Synonyms
- Cecidomyia fraxini Bremi, 1847; Perrisia fraxini Kieffer, 1897

= Dasineura fraxini =

Species of fly

Dasineura fraxini is a gall midge which forms galls on the leaves and petioles of ash (Fraxinus species). It was first described by Johann Jacob Bremi-Wolf in 1847.

== Appearance of the gall ==
Most of the gall is on the underside of the main vein, where it forms a narrow green pouch. There can be several on a leaf, ranging in size from 5 mm to 30 mm, although they can coalesce. Each contains an orange larva. There is a slit-like opening on the upperside of the leaf. The galls can be found from June to October and can also be found on the petiole and rachis. It is found on Fraxinus angustifolia & subsp., F. excelsior, F. ornus and F. oxycarpa.

Inquiline

The larvae of Clinodiplosis botularia are reddish-yellow, grow faster and outcompete the gall maker, which perish.

== Distribution ==
The insect is found in Europe.
