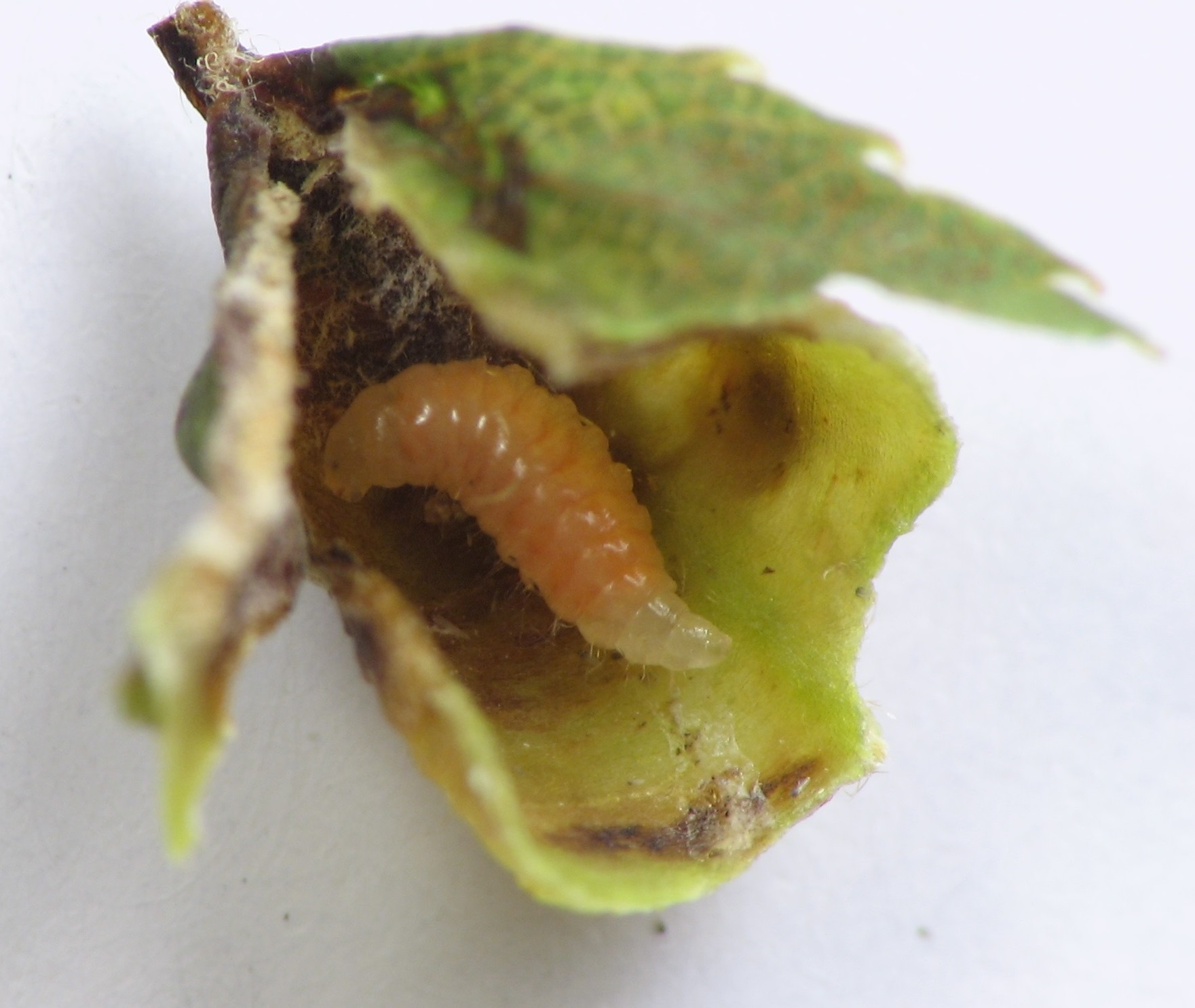
- Larva inside a gall

Scientific classification
- Domain: Eukaryota
- Kingdom: Animalia
- Phylum: Arthropoda
- Class: Insecta
- Order: Diptera
- Family: Cecidomyiidae
- Genus: Dasineura
- Species: D. salicifoliae

Binomial name
- Dasineura salicifoliae (Osten Sacken, 1866)

Synonyms
- Cecidomyia salicifoliae Osten Sacken, 1866; Rhabdophaga salicifolia Felt, 1907

= Dasineura salicifoliae =

Species of fly

Dasineura salicifoliae is a species of gall midges, insects in the family Cecidomyiidae.

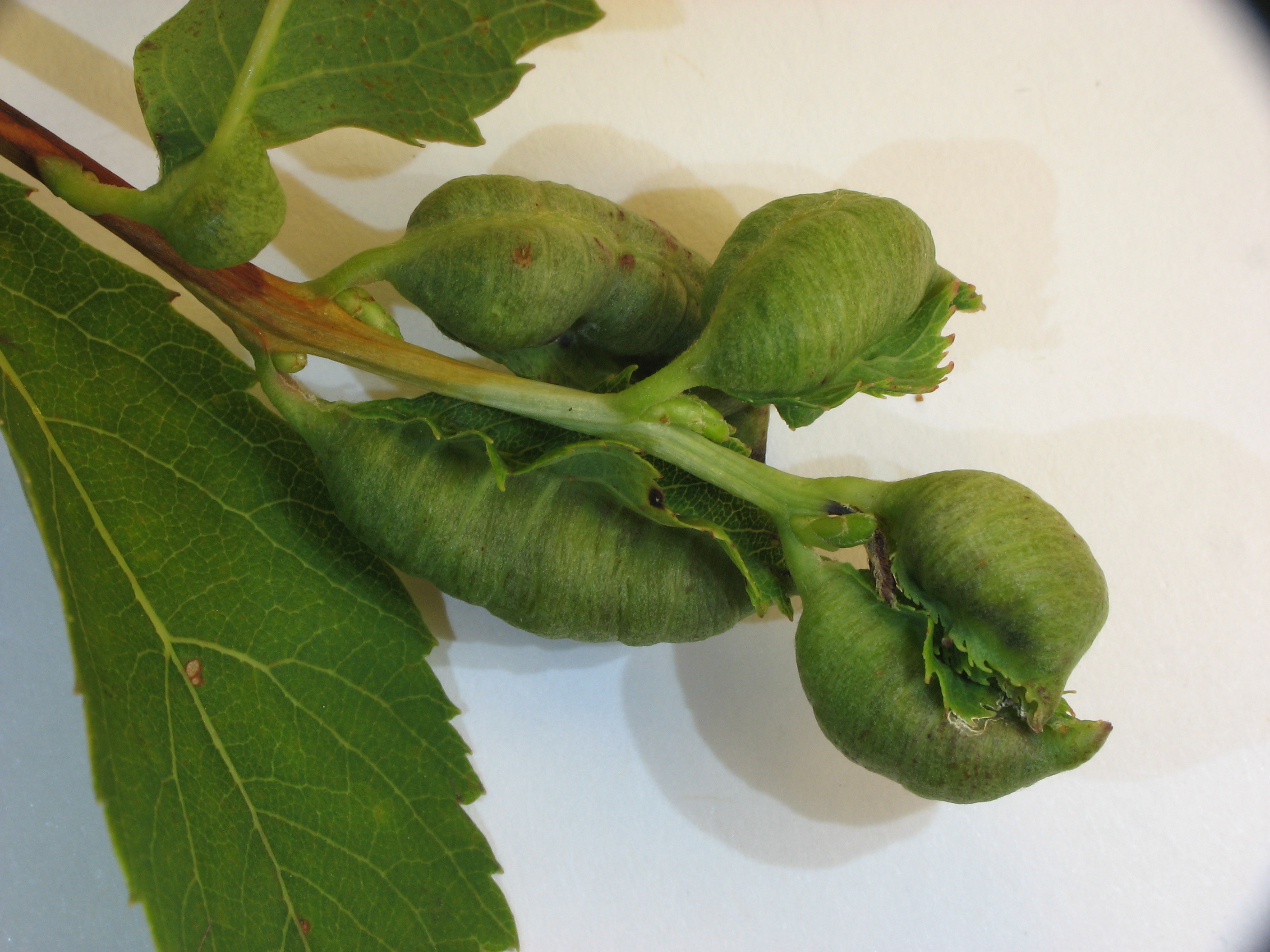
Galls on meadowsweet
