= Dasineura basavannii =

Scientific classification
- Kingdom: Animalia
- Phylum: Arthropoda
- Class: Insecta
- Order: Diptera
- Family: Cecidomyiidae
- Genus: Dasineura
- Species: D. basavannii

Binomial name
- Dasineura basavannii Vasanthakumar and Udikeri, 2025

Species of fly

Dasineura basavannii is a species of dipteran gall midge that parasitizes gaillardia flowers (specifically Gaillardia pulchella) from India, causing rotting and discoloration in the flower buds. The body length of the imago was not noted in the description, but the length of the pupae is 1.4–1.5 mm (0.055–0.059 in) and the larvae are 1.3–1.6 mm (0.051–0.063 in).

== Discovery ==
The species was discovered after a farmer in Hulloli village, Belagavi district, India reported that 40% of their guillardia flowers had noticeable discoloration (in November 2022). That meant the routine management was probably failing, which led to detailed examination. Upon the examination, small, creamy white larvae were found in large numbers. They noticed the sclerotized organ on the ventral side of the prothorax and determined that the symptoms were caused by gall midges.

== Etymology ==
The specific epithet is a tribute to Mr. Basavanni Managutti, a floriculturist who helped collect the specimens they used for the description of the species.
