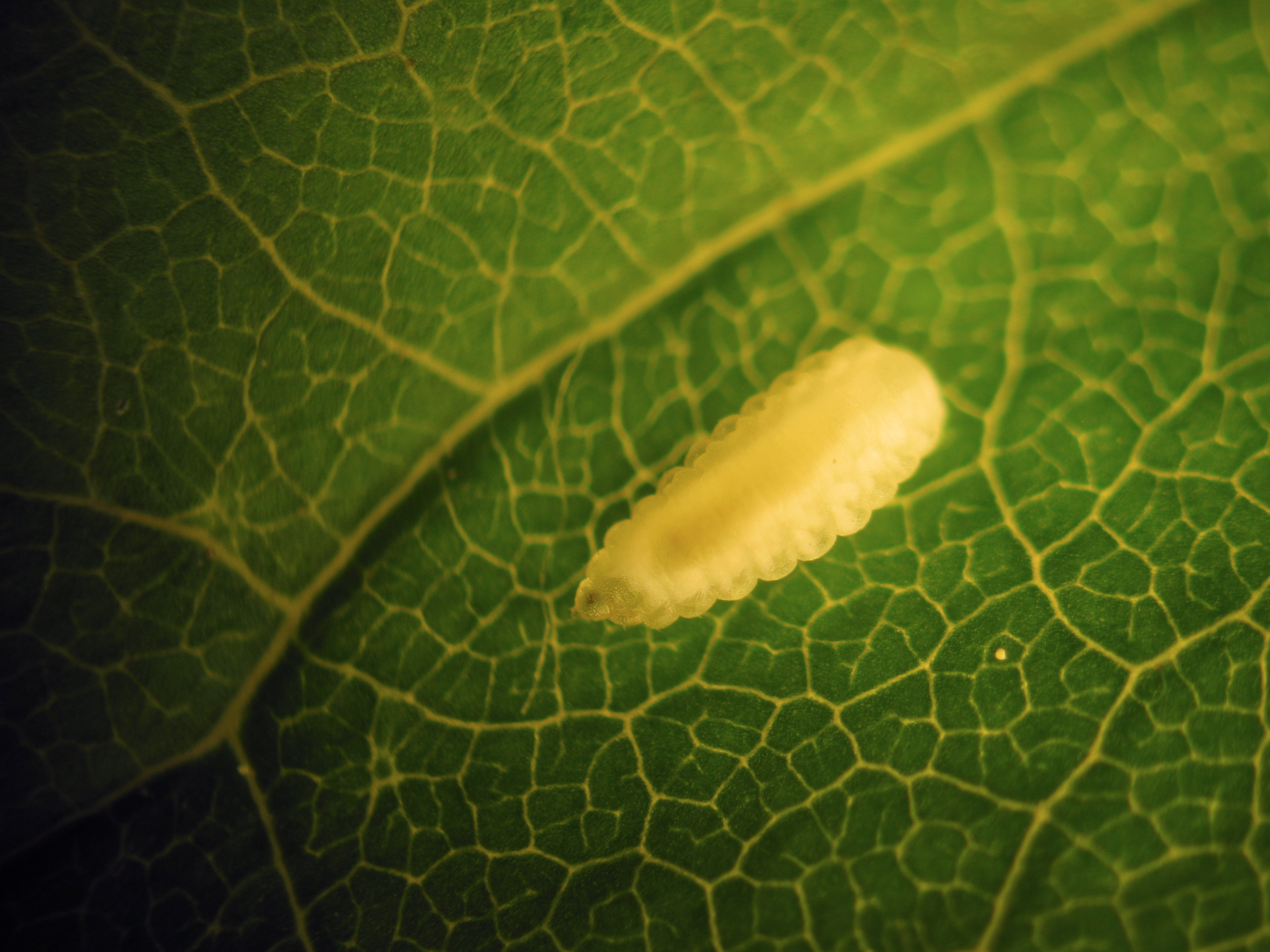
- Larva

Scientific classification
- Domain: Eukaryota
- Kingdom: Animalia
- Phylum: Arthropoda
- Class: Insecta
- Order: Diptera
- Family: Cecidomyiidae
- Genus: Dasineura
- Species: D. pellex

Binomial name
- Dasineura pellex (Osten Sacken, 1862)

Synonyms
- Cecidomyia pellex Osten Sacken, 1862

= Dasineura pellex =

Species of fly

Dasineura pellex, the ash bullet gall midge, is a species of gall midge, insects in the family Cecidomyiidae.

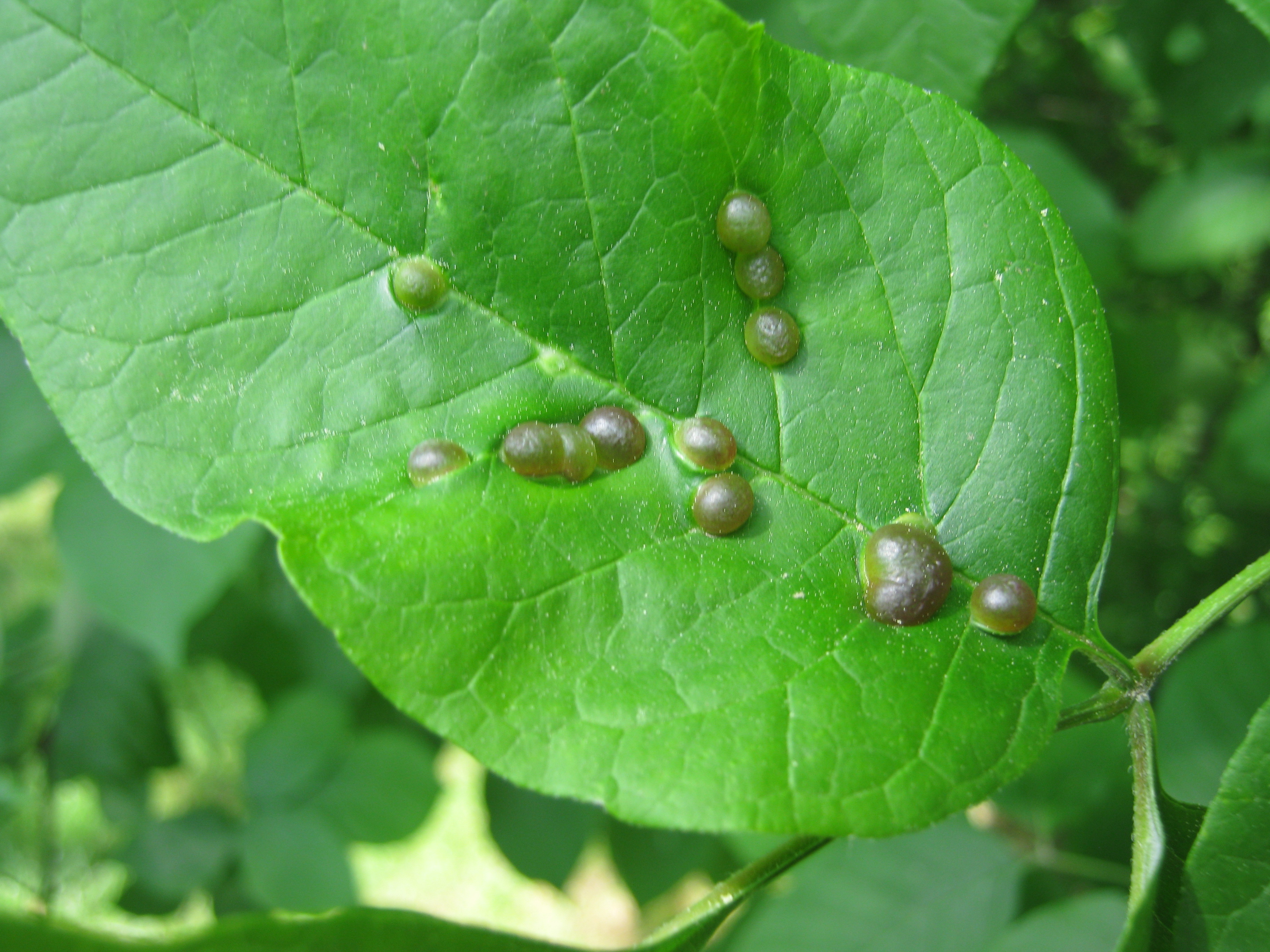
Galls on leaf of ash tree (Fraxinus)
