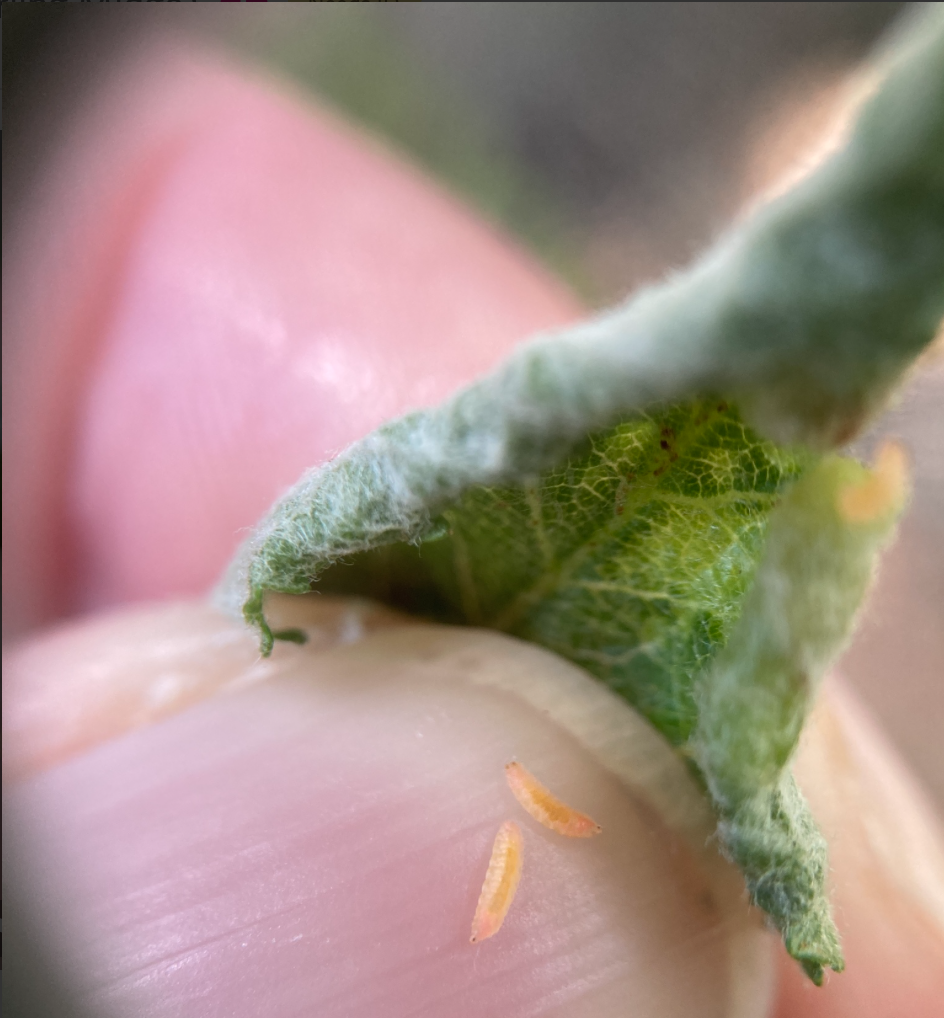
- Larvae on apple leaf

Scientific classification
- Kingdom: Animalia
- Phylum: Arthropoda
- Clade: Pancrustacea
- Class: Insecta
- Order: Diptera
- Family: Cecidomyiidae
- Genus: Dasineura
- Species: D. mali

Binomial name
- Dasineura mali (Kieffer, 1904)

= Dasineura mali =

Species of insect

Dasineura mali, commonly known as the apple leaf curling midge or the apple leaf midge, is a species of gall midge belonging to the family Cecidomyiidae, within the order Diptera.

As a member of the family Cecidomyiidae, D. mali is grouped with other midges, a diverse selection of tiny flies, some of which are known for their ability to induce gall formation on host plants.

== Description ==
Dasineura mali is a minute and delicate species of dipteran, belonging to the family Cecidomyiidae. Adults measure between 2 and 3 mm (0.08 and 0.12 in) in length. Identifying features include the long moniliform antennae with whorls of fine hairs, which are used for sensory perception and navigation. It has small, simple ocelli which enable light detection and orientation. Its wings appear fringed with fine hairs, with a low number of longitudinal veins and lacking obvious cross veins; these factors contribute to its fragile appearance.

This midge's coxae are not elongated, and its tibiae lack spurs, which distinguishes it from related species. Its tibiae provide support and stability during movement. Larvae with red or orange hues are characteristic of D. mali, though differentiation from other species can be challenging, as larvae may also exhibit a yellow or white colour. To identify D. mali larvae, the length of setose papillae on the first thoracic segment and the shape of the sternal spatula are measured. Larval characteristics include small heads with pigment spots but no eyes. The body has thirteen visible trunk segments and nine pairs of spiracles on the prothorax and first eight abdominal segments, facilitating respiration during development. The sternal spatula, a mid-ventral structure on the thorax, is a distinguishing feature of D. mali larvae within the Cecidomyiidae family.

== Natural global range ==
Dasineura mali originated in the Palaearctic region, where it evolved alongside its primary host, the apple (Malus domestica). Accidental introductions to new regions expanded its distribution, reaching North America and New Zealand. These introductions provided opportunities for D. mali to establish populations beyond its native range.

It has spread to three regions: Europe, America, and New Zealand, where it prefers host plants belonging to Rosaceae, which includes apples, peaches, pears, and cherries. In North America, insects that initially fed on wild relatives of these host plants, such as native roses, may have gradually adapted to cultivated apple trees. The historical association between D. mali and the wild species within the Rosaceae family likely facilitated its transition to cultivated apple trees as its primary host.

== New Zealand range ==
The introduction of Dasineura mali into New Zealand occurred in 1950, marking its establishment as a secondary pest primarily controlled by broad-spectrum insecticides targeted at key pests. Regions with high levels of apple and pear cultivation serve as significant habitats for this species. Hawke's Bay, which is often referred to as the fruit bowl of New Zealand, offers a diverse range of apple varieties, stone fruits, and soft fruits. Nelson is New Zealand's oldest apple-growing region. The establishment of D. mali in Nelson would present significant challenges for the industry, as this invasive pest induces the formation of galls on host leaves. Otago serves as the southernmost apple-growing area in New Zealand. With a rich history in orcharding, Otago contributes significantly to the country's export crop production. Although current iNaturalist observations may not fully support the presence of D. mali in New Zealand's apple orchards, the species's close affinity with these environments suggests the potential for its establishment.

== Habitat ==
Apple orchards are the ideal habitat for Dasineura mali, given their close association with cultivated apple trees; the species is an established pest of apple trees in New Zealand. Apple trees offer ample food resources for D. mali larvae, while the managed nature of orchards provides shelter and protection from natural predators and adverse environmental conditions. The larval feeding gall-inducing behaviour leads to the characteristic symptom of rolled or twisted leaves on apple trees. Mature larvae seeking pupation sites may contaminate fruit with pupal cocoons, posing concerns for fresh fruit quality and quarantine.

== Life cycle and phenology ==
Dasineura mali undergoes four generations yearly in most of New Zealand, from early spring to mid-autumn. In Central Otago, there are typically three or four generations based on summer temperatures. Adults emerge from soil litter, immediately mate, and lay eggs on growing shoots. Larvae develop within tightly rolled leaves for 2–3 weeks, during which time they are protected from insecticides. Mature larvae pupate in the ground and other sheltered locations. Overwintering as mature larvae in the soil is common among successive generations.

The life cycle of D. mali begins with females laying their eggs on growing shoot tips of the host plant. The eggs incubate for 3–5 days, depending on the ambient temperature. When larvae emerge, they feed on the young leaves of the host plant. Feeding induces the formation of leaf galls on the outer edges of the leaves, providing a protective tent for larval development. As the larvae mature, they exit the leaf galls and descend to the soil, where they undergo pupation. The D. mali lifecycle exhibits distinct seasonal patterns, with larvae from the late third generation and all individuals in the fourth generation undergoing overwintering. During the winter months, they remain in their larval stage, awaiting the onset of spring. It is during the early spring, typically in early September, that overwintering larvae undergo pupation.

Researchers examined egg-laying behaviour by randomly collecting D. mali eggs from different host trees during the oviposition peaks of the first, second, and third generations. These eggs were then transported to the laboratory for further examination. The investigation of D. mali's phenology revealed a seasonal pattern.

Over two consecutive years, researchers gathered mature larvae of D. mali to study developmental stages, representing multiple generations. As the season advanced, researchers noticed that changes in environmental factors, such as the availability of suitable egg-laying sites and dry weather, influenced egg-laying behaviour.

The transition from eggs to the end of the white larval stage typically spans 6–27 days, with later generations of the apple leaf curling midge exhibiting more rapid development. 80% of plants placed in an enclosure with D. mali displayed eggs within two days, followed by the appearance of leaf galls within 4–5 days.

== Diet and foraging ==
Gall midges are the richest group of gall-inducing arthropods in Europe and the rest of the world. Phytophagous larvae of gall midges cause galls on all organs of host plants: on stems or twigs, on terminal or axial leaf buds, flower buds, leaves, flowers, fruits and roots. Gall midges, including Dasineura mali, represent one of the most diverse groups of gall-inducing arthropods worldwide. Members of the Rosaceae family, including apples, peaches, pears, and cherries, are preferred hosts. In North America, insects originally feeding on wild relatives of these crops, such as native roses, may have transitioned to cultivated apple trees over time.

Within the Rosaceae family, to which apple trees belong, D. mali larvae are known to be monophagous, meaning they exclusively feed on plants within this botanical family. Specifically, they target cultivated varieties like Malus domestica (domestic apple) as well as wild species such as Malus sylvestris (European crab apple). From stems and twigs to terminal or axial leaf buds, flower buds, leaves, flowers, fruits, and roots, gall midge larvae demonstrate an impressive ability to induce gall formation across all parts of their host plants.

== Predators, parasites, and diseases ==
Dasineura mali inflicts damage upon apple trees by inducing the formation of leaf galls. The galls disrupt the normal growth and development of affected foliage, potentially leading to diminished fruit yields and compromised tree health. The discovery of a new species closely associated with D. mali has encouraged scientific interest. Macrolabis mali has been observed across a geographical range extending from South Tyrol to southwestern Germany. Researchers hypothesise that M. mali may function as an inquiline insect within the nests of D. mali, suggesting a potential ecological relationship between the two species. The predatory mirid bug, Sejanus albisignata, is also a player in the ecological balance of apple orchards and has been observed feeding on eggs of the D. mali. This feeding activity is a natural biocontrol mechanism suppressing pest populations and reducing damage to apple crops.

== Other information ==
The adult D. mali is a small fly, typically measuring only a few millimetres in length. The larvae, which are the stage responsible for causing damage to apple trees, are tiny and maggot-like. The recent identification of the sex pheromone of the D. mali ushers the development of innovative monitoring techniques aimed at detecting and controlling D. mali populations more effectively. By synthesising the sex pheromone, researchers can create specialised traps or attractants that target male D. mali individuals, allowing accurate monitoring of populations. Pheromone-based strategies hold promise for integrated pest management approaches, offering environmentally friendly alternatives to conventional insecticide treatments.

Malus domestica is widely cultivated globally, with China being the world's largest apple producer. With extensive exports and significant acreage dedicated to apple cultivation around the world, the threat of disrupted export markets and heightened production costs could become a reality. California growers, for example, export apples to 27 countries and maintain over 14,000 acres dedicated to apple production, valued at over $105 million.

While mature orchard yields may not be significantly affected, reduced fruit size and bud formation could occur, impacting newly planted trees and nursery stock.
