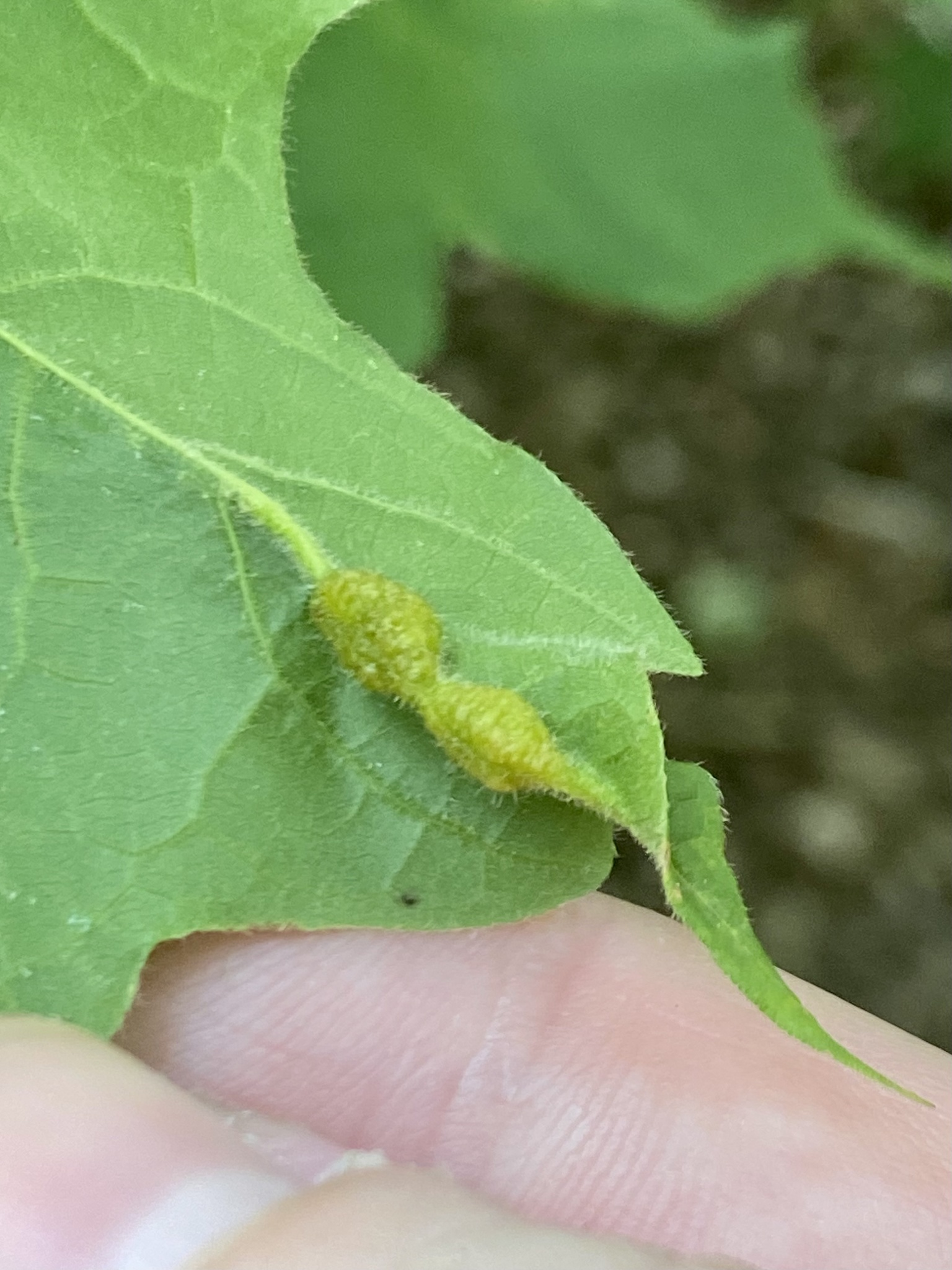

Scientific classification
- Domain: Eukaryota
- Kingdom: Animalia
- Phylum: Arthropoda
- Class: Insecta
- Order: Diptera
- Family: Cecidomyiidae
- Supertribe: Lasiopteridi
- Tribe: Oligotrophini
- Genus: Dasineura
- Species: D. communis

Binomial name
- Dasineura communis (Felt, 1911)

Synonyms
- Dasyneura communis Felt, 1911

= Dasineura communis =

Species of fly

Dasineura communis, the gouty vein midge, is a species of gall midges in the family Cecidomyiidae.
