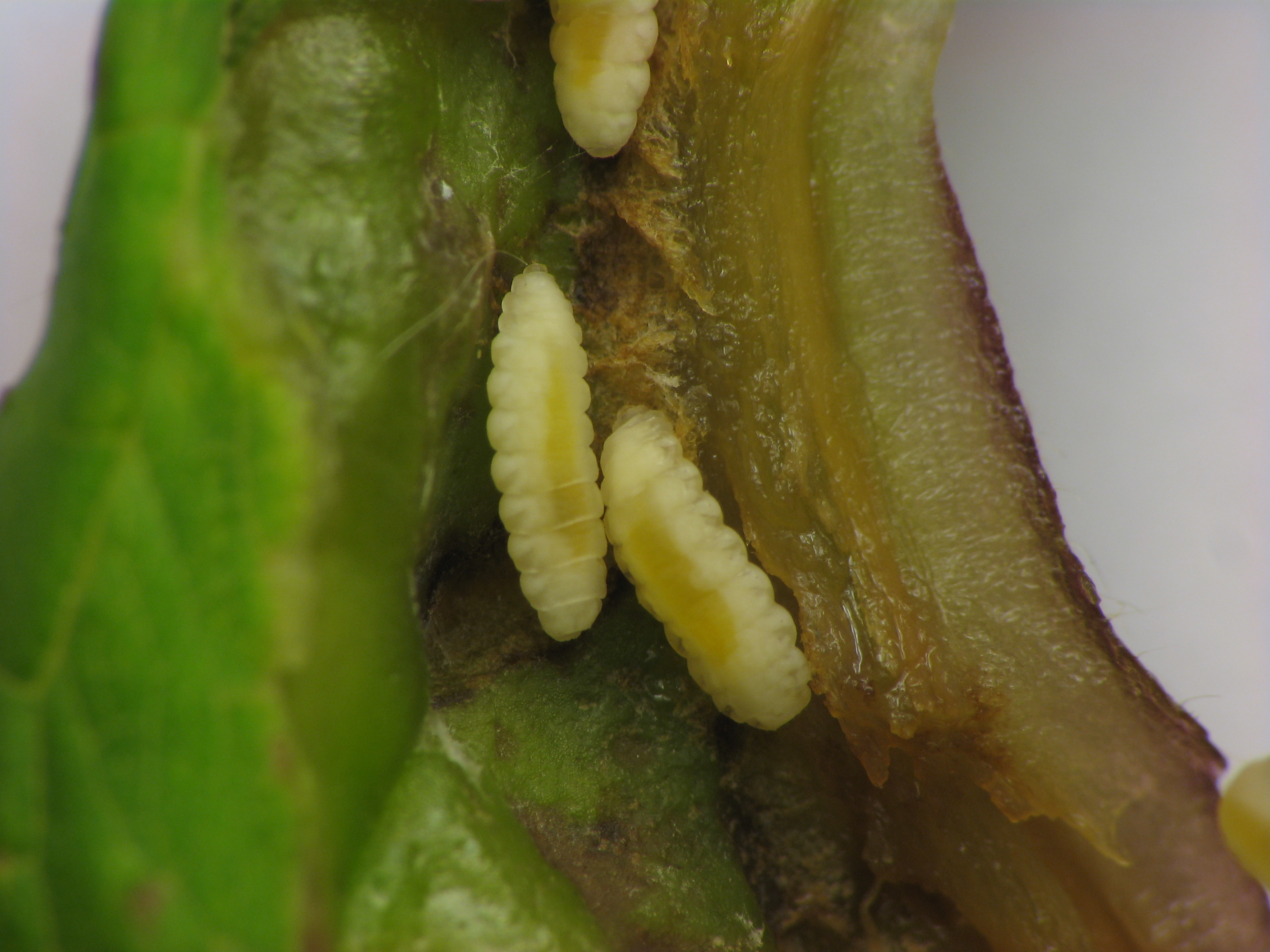
- Larvae in gall

Scientific classification
- Domain: Eukaryota
- Kingdom: Animalia
- Phylum: Arthropoda
- Class: Insecta
- Order: Diptera
- Family: Cecidomyiidae
- Genus: Dasineura
- Species: D. tumidosae

Binomial name
- Dasineura tumidosae (Felt, 1908)

Synonyms
- Dasyneura tumidosae Felt, 1908

= Dasineura tumidosae =

Species of fly

Dasineura tumidosae is a species of gall midge, insects in the family Cecidomyiidae.

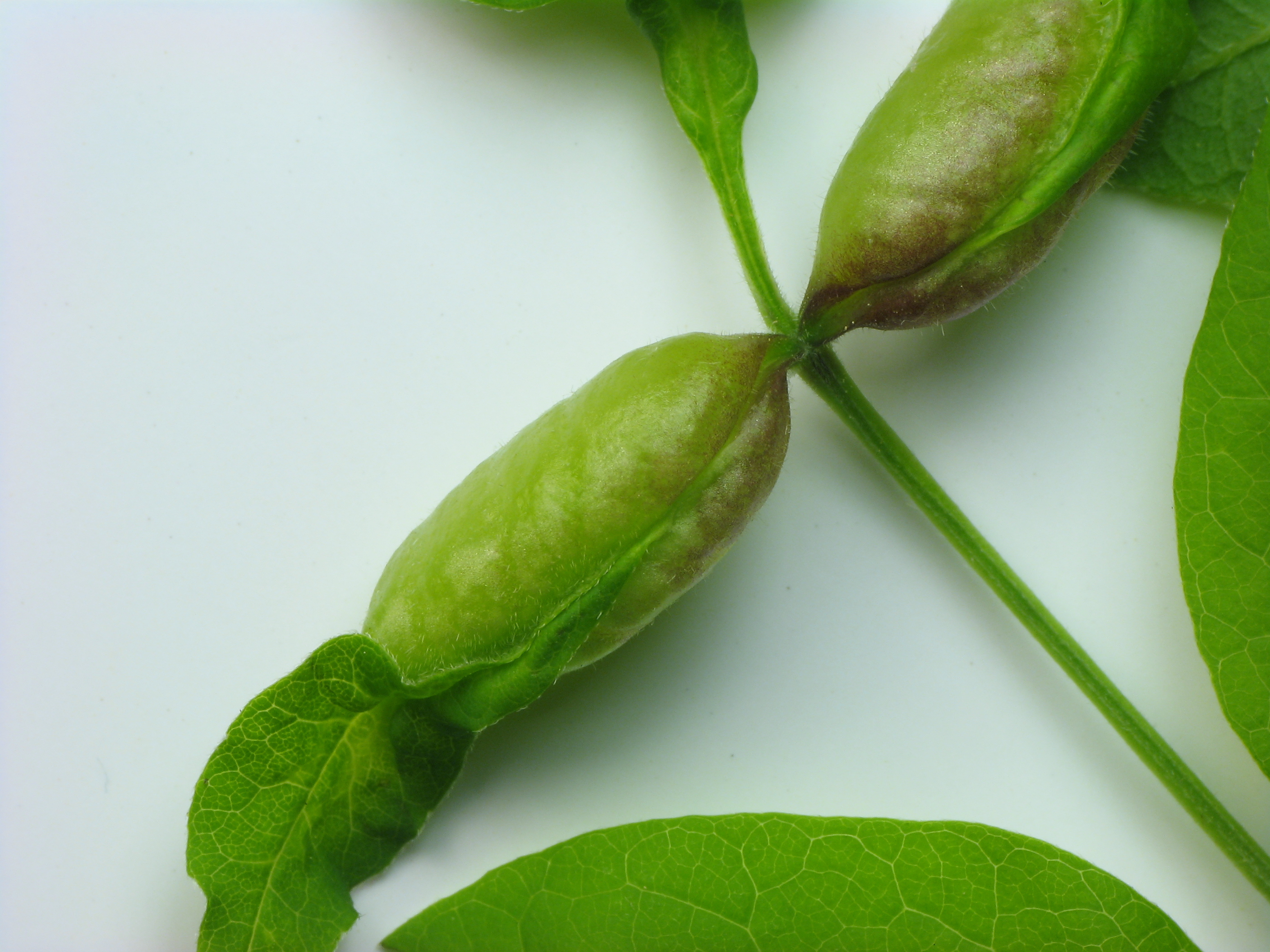
Galls on ash tree
