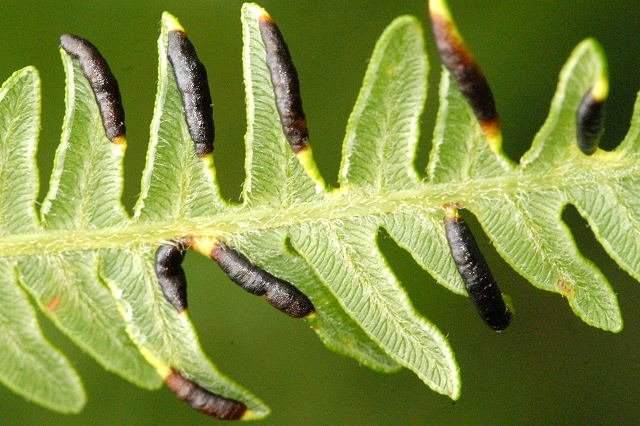
- Dasineura pteridis Gall on Pteridium aquilinum

Scientific classification
- Kingdom: Animalia
- Phylum: Arthropoda
- Class: Insecta
- Order: Diptera
- Family: Cecidomyiidae
- Genus: Dasineura
- Species: D. pteridis

Binomial name
- Dasineura pteridis (Müller, A., 1871)

= Dasineura pteridis =

Species of fly

Dasineura pteridis is a species of fly in the family Cecidomyiidae. It is found in the Palearctic. The larvae gall Pteridium aquilinum.
