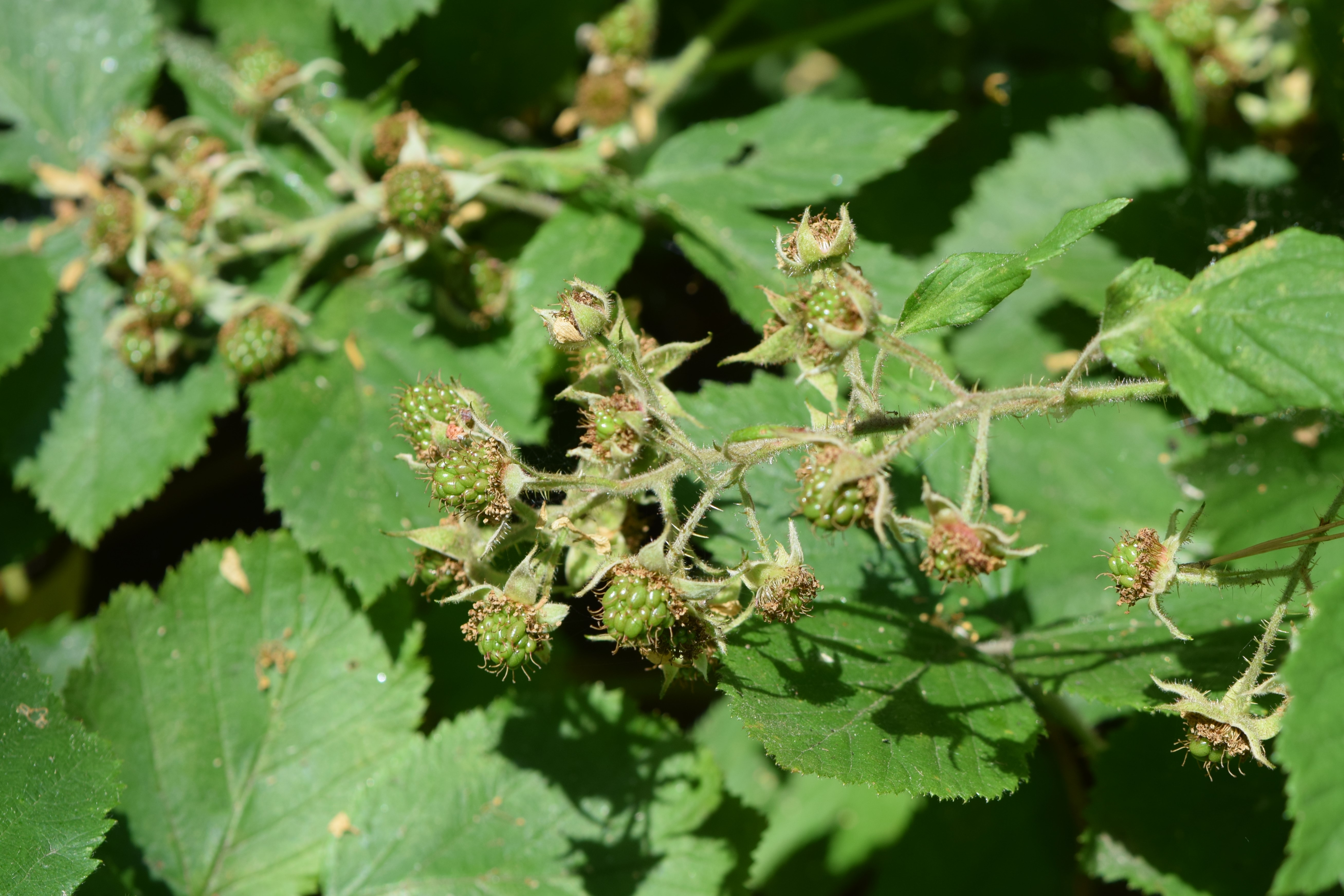
- Unripe fruit

Scientific classification
- Kingdom: Plantae
- Clade: Tracheophytes
- Clade: Angiosperms
- Clade: Eudicots
- Clade: Rosids
- Order: Rosales
- Family: Rosaceae
- Genus: Rubus
- Species: R. hirtus

Binomial name
- Rubus hirtus Waldst. & Kit.

Synonyms
- Rubus glandulosus Bellardi; Rubus gracilicaulis Gremli; Rubus tenuiglandulosus Gremli

= Rubus hirtus =

Species of plant in the rose family

Rubus hirtus is a species of flowering plant in the Rubus section (the blackberries) of the genus Rubus, family Rosaceae. It is native to most of southern and central Europe, as well as Belarus, Ukraine, the Caucasus and Turkey. A woodland species, its distribution largely corresponds to that of the beeches Fagus sylvatica and the closely related F. orientalis.

== Ecology ==
Rubus hirtus is one of the most common understory plants in deciduous and mixed forests of the Western Carpathians, capable of constituting up to 90% of forest floor plant cover in canopy gaps. The species demonstrates remarkable shade tolerance, allowing it to persist under closed canopy conditions with minimal mortality, while simultaneously showing opportunistic growth when light conditions improve. It typically grows as a clonal plant with long, leafy primocanes (first-year stems) that grow erectly for several weeks in spring before becoming procumbent, with density ranging from 0.003/m^{2} in dense forests to 24/m^{2} in canopy gaps.

The plant reproduces primarily through vegetative propagation via tip-rooting, wherein primocane tips establish new rooting points in early fall (September-October), becoming independent after one year. This reproductive strategy results in rapid colonization of newly formed canopy gaps, with studies showing density increases of nearly seven-fold over 7–8 years following gap formation. Sexual reproduction occurs but appears to play a minor ecological role, as seedlings rarely survive beyond two years. When expanding into gaps, primocanes spread with equal frequency in all directions, creating a pattern resembling random diffusion models.

Response to canopy gaps shows distinctive patterns, with average shoot size and proportion of tip-rooting canes peaking in the second year after gap formation before gradually declining. Individual plants contribute unequally to gap colonization, with a small fraction of plants producing abundant offspring while approximately 25% fail to propagate vegetatively. Unlike many forest herbs that show time lag in response to canopy disturbance, R. hirtus responds rapidly, typically achieving complete ground coverage within five years of gap formation. The persistence of its dominance in forest communities is dependent on recurrent canopy openings, as its abundance gradually declines under prolonged closed canopy conditions, albeit at a very slow rate due to its shade tolerance.
