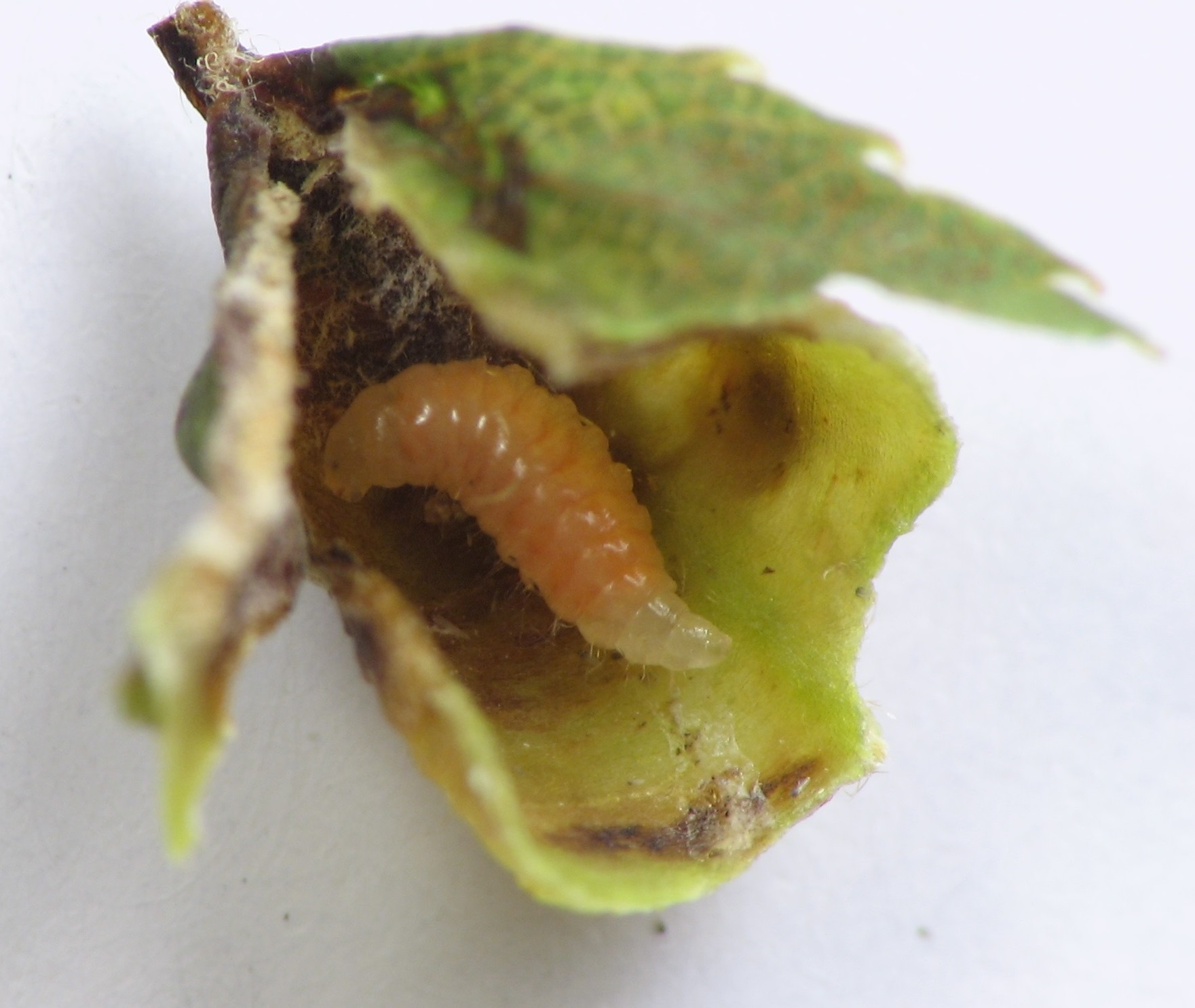
- Dasineura salicifoliae larva in gall

Scientific classification
- Kingdom: Animalia
- Phylum: Arthropoda
- Clade: Pancrustacea
- Class: Insecta
- Order: Diptera
- Family: Cecidomyiidae
- Subfamily: Cecidomyiinae
- Supertribe: Lasiopteridi
- Tribe: Oligotrophini
- Genus: Dasineura; Rondani, 1840

Type species
- Tipula sisymbrii Schrank, 1803

Synonyms
- Neocerata Coquillett, 1900

= Dasineura =

Genus of flies

Dasineura is a genus of midges in the family Cecidomyiidae, some of which cause galls on plants such as Dasineura crataegi on hawthorn (Crataegus monogyna) and Dasineura fraxinea on ash (Fraxinus excelsior).

== Gallery ==
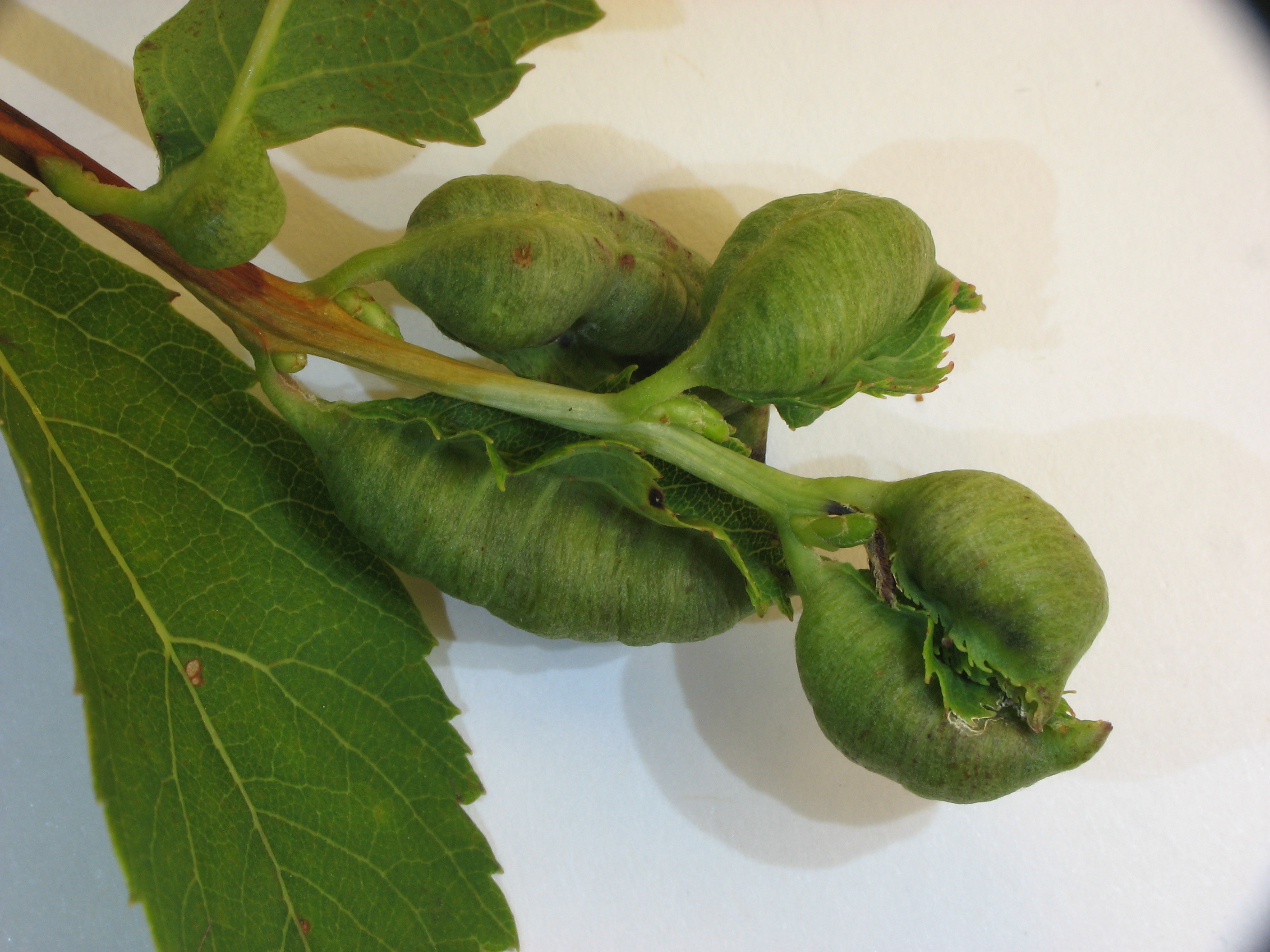
Galls of Dasineura salicifoliae

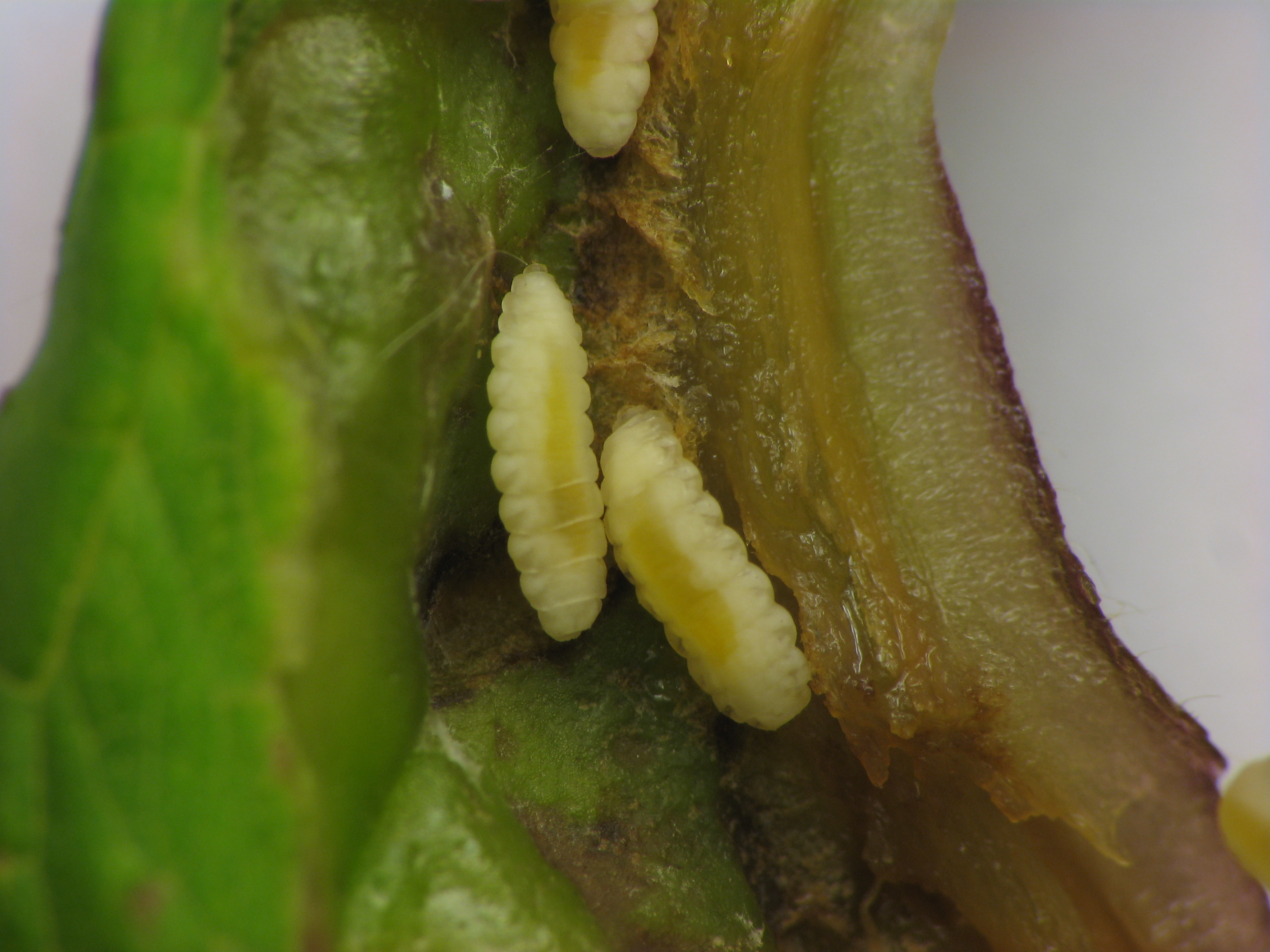
Larvae of Dasineura tumidosae

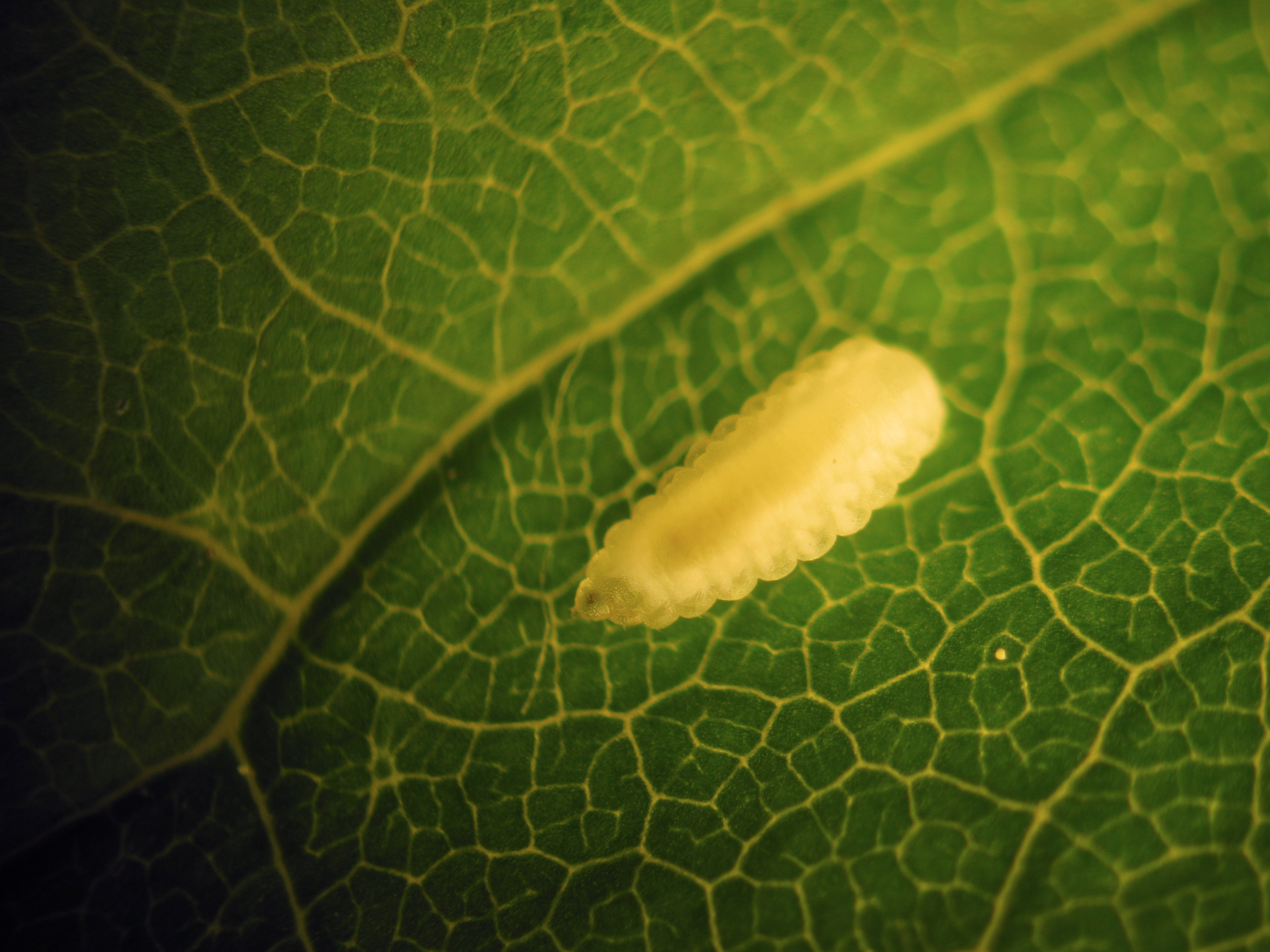
Larva of Dasineura pellex

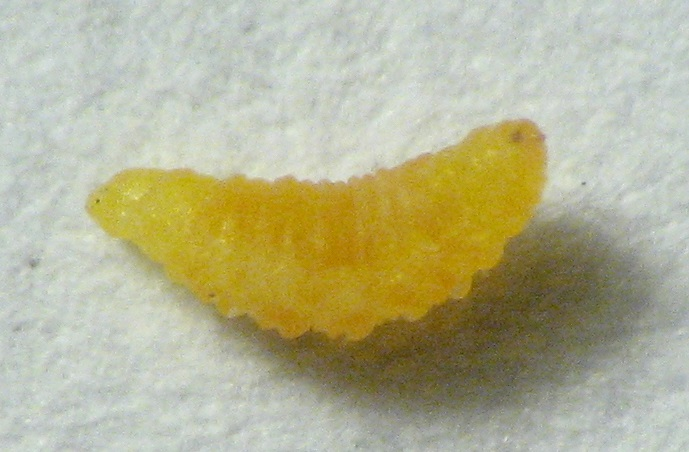
Larva of Dasineura carbonaria

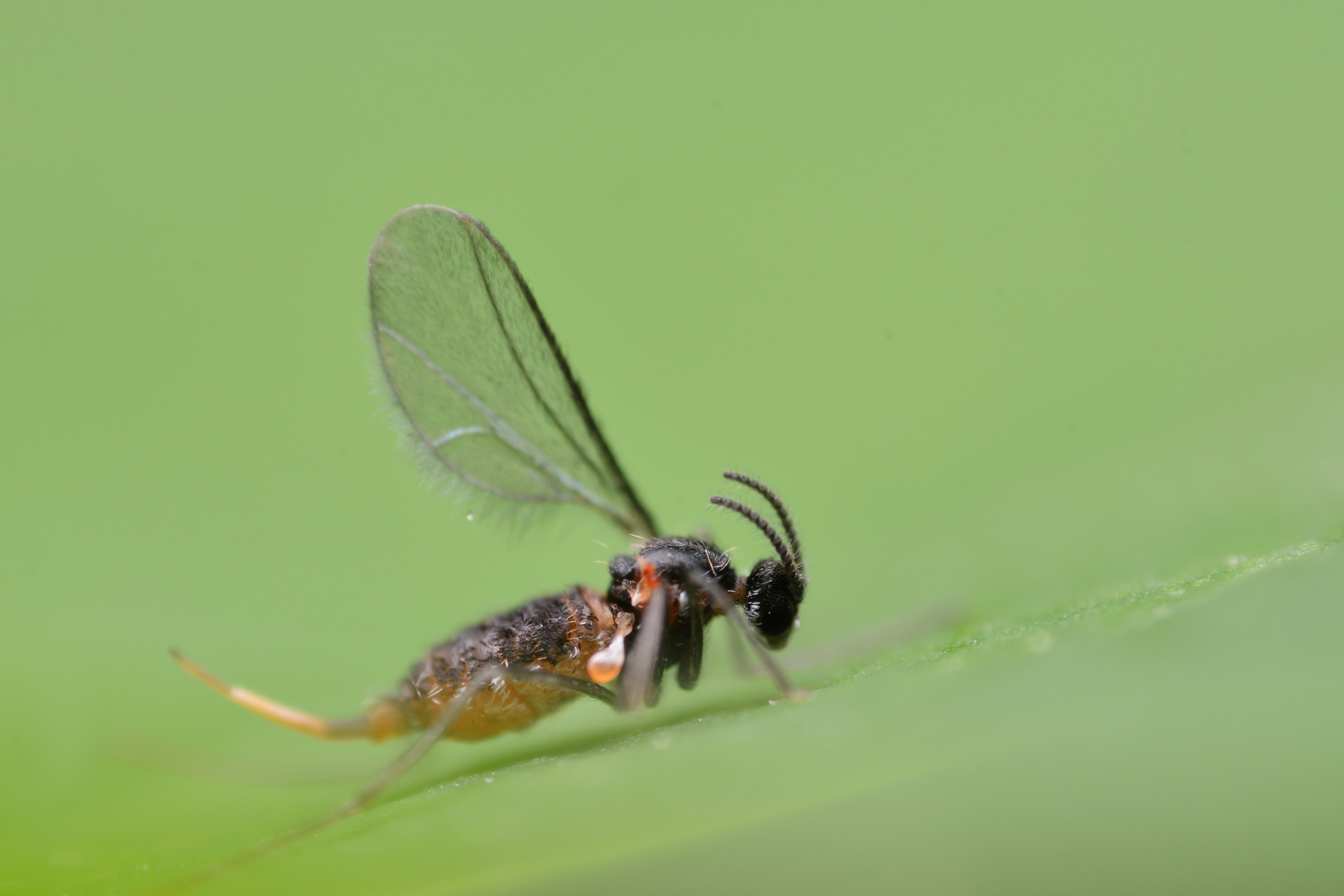
Dasineura brassicae, adult

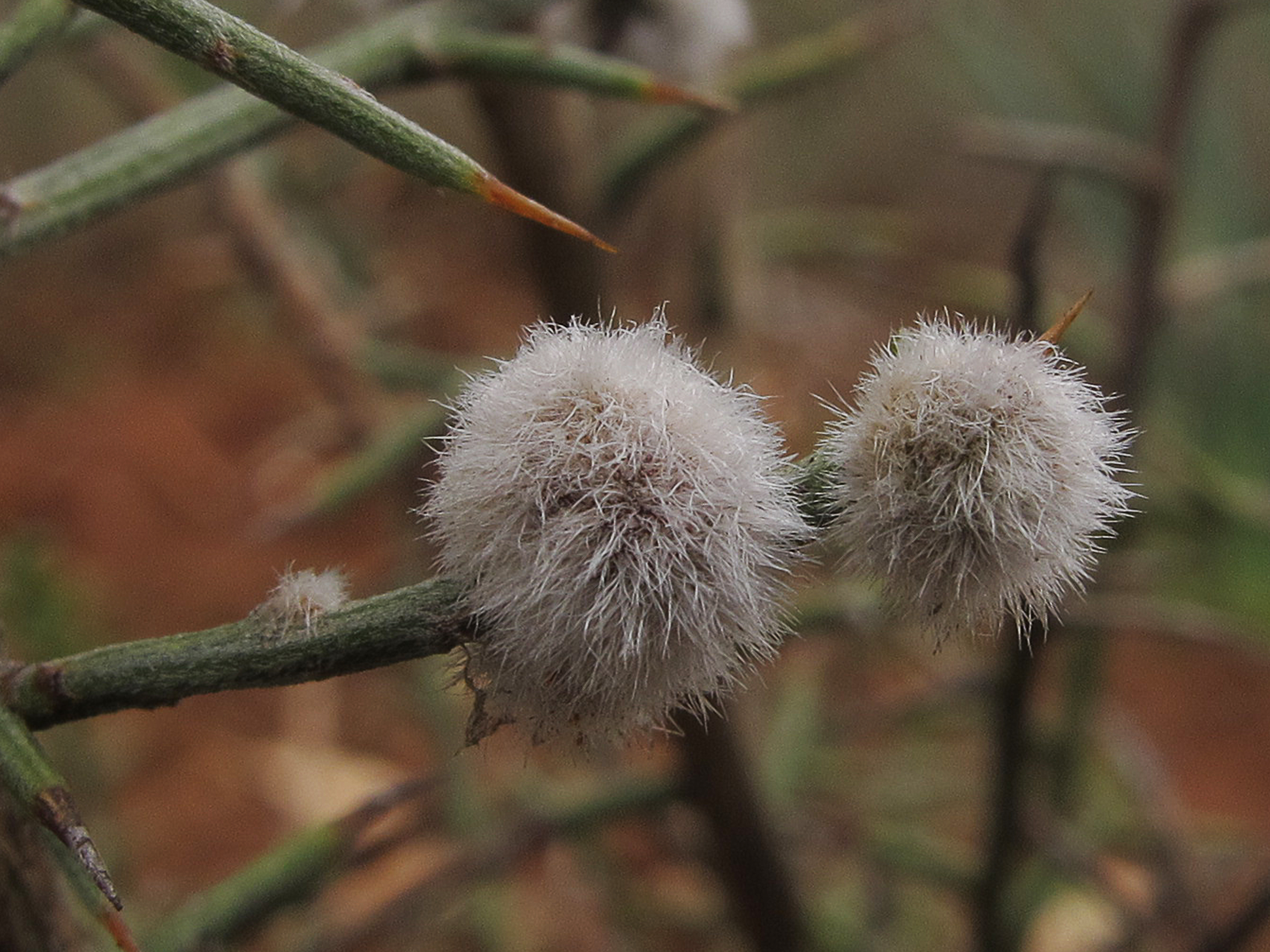
Galls of Dasineura scorpii

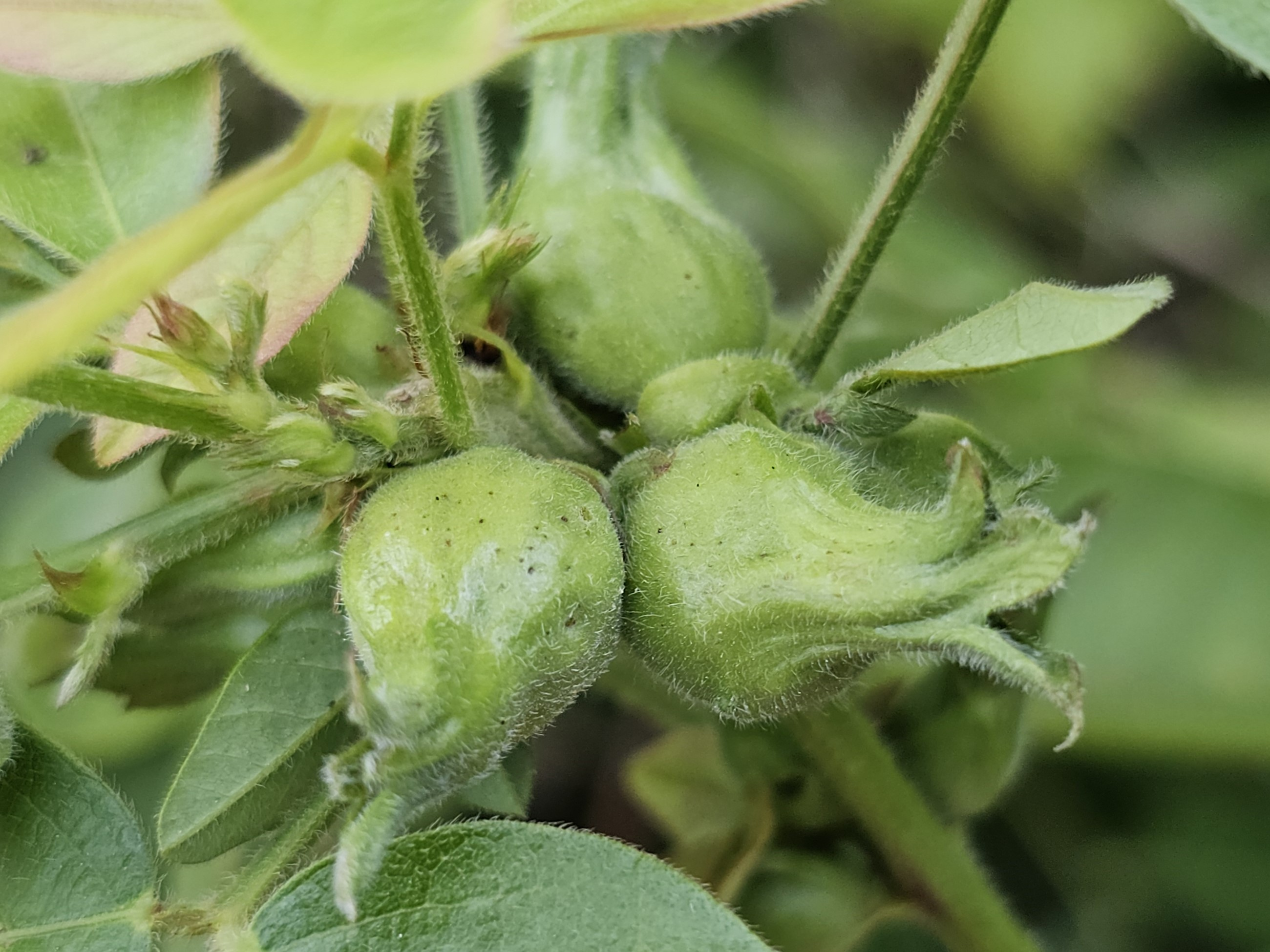
Galls of Dasineura meibomiae

== See also ==
- List of Dasineura species
