= List of Cecidomyiinae genera =

This is a list of 123 genera in the subfamily Cecidomyiinae, gall midges.

== Cecidomyiinae genera ==
- Acericecis Gagne, 1983^{i c g b}
- Adiplosis ^{i c g}
- Ametrodiplosis ^{i c g}
- Ancylodiplosis ^{i c g}
- Apagodiplosis Gagne, 1973^{i c g b}
- Aphidoletes Kieffer, 1904^{i c g b}
- Aphodiplosis ^{i g}
- Arthrocnodax Rubsaamen, 1895^{i c g b}
- Asphondylia Loew, 1850^{i c g b}
- Asteromyia Felt, 1910^{i c g b}
- Astictoneura Gagne, 1969^{i c g b}
- Blaesodiplosis Gagne, 1973^{i c g b}
- Brachineura Rondani, 1840^{i c g}
- Bremia ^{i c g}
- Bruggmannia ^{i c g}
- Bruggmanniella Tavares, 1909^{c g b}
- Calamomyia ^{i c g}
- Camptoneuromyia Felt, 1908^{i c g b}
- Cartodiplosis ^{i c g}
- Caryomyia Felt, 1909^{i c g b} (hickory gall midges)
- Cecidomyia ^{i g b} (pine pitch midges)
- Celticecis Gagné, 1983^{i c g b} (hackberry gall midges)
- Chilophaga Gagne, 1969^{i c g b}
- Clinodiplosis Kieffer, 1894^{i c g b}
- Coccidomyia ^{i c g}
- Coccodiplosis Meijere, 1917^{i c g}
- Contarinia Rondani, 1860^{i c g b}
- Coquillettomyia Felt, 1908^{i c g b}
- Cordylodiplosis ^{i c g}
- Craneiobia Kieffer, 1913^{i c g b}
- Ctenodactylomyia ^{i c g}
- Cystiphora Kieffer, 1892^{i c g b}
- Dasineura Rondani, 1840^{i c g b}
- Dentifibula ^{i c g}
- Diadiplosis ^{i c g}
- Dicrodiplosis Kieffer, 1895^{i c g b}
- Didactylomyia Felt, 1911^{i c g}
- Edestochilus ^{i c g}
- Edestosperma ^{i c g}
- Endaphis ^{i c g}
- Epidiplosis ^{i c g}
- Epimyia ^{i c g}
- Feltiella Rübsaamen, 1911^{i c g b}
- Ficiomyia ^{i c g}
- Giardomyia ^{i c g}
- Glenodiplosis ^{i c g}
- Gliaspilota Gagné, 2008^{c g b}
- Gongrodiplosis ^{i c g}
- Halodiplosis ^{i c g}
- Harmandia Kieffer, 1896^{i g b}
- Heterocontarinia Hardy, 1960^{i c g}
- Homobremia ^{i c g}
- Hybolasioptera ^{i c g}
- Hyperdiplosis ^{i c g}
- Isolasioptera ^{i c g}
- Iteomyia Kieffer, 1913^{i c g b}
- Janetiella Kieffer, 1898^{i c g b}
- Kalodiplosis ^{i g}
- Kaltenbachiola ^{i c g}
- Karshomyia Felt, 1908^{i c g b}
- Lasioptera Meigen, 1818^{i c g b}
- Lasiopteryx Stephens, 1829^{i c g}
- Ledomyia ^{i c g}
- Lestodiplosis Kieffer, 1894^{i c g b}
- Lobodiplosis ^{i g}
- Lobopteromyia ^{i c g}
- Lonicerae ^{b}
- Lygocecis ^{i c g}
- Macrodiplosis Kieffer, 1895^{i c g b}
- Mayetiola ^{i c g}
- Meunieriella Kieffer, 1909^{i c g b}
- Microdiplosis Tavares, 1908^{i c g}
- Monarthropalpus Rübsaamen, 1892^{i c g b}
- Mycodiplosis Rubsaamen, 1895^{i c g b}
- Nanodiplosis Kieffer, 1913^{i c g}
- Neolasioptera Felt, 1908^{i c g b}
- Obolodiplosis Felt, 1908^{i c g b}
- Odontodiplosis ^{i c g}
- Oligotrophus ^{i c g}
- Olpodiplosis Gagne, 1973^{i c g b}
- Ozirhincus ^{i c g}
- Paradiplosis Felt, 1908^{i c g b}
- Parallelodiplosis Rübsaamen, 1910^{i c g b}
- Pectinodiplosis ^{i c g}
- Phaenolauthia Kieffer^{i}
- Pilodiplosis Gagne, 1973^{i c g b}
- Pinyonia Gagne, 1970^{i c g b}
- Pitydiplosis ^{i c g}
- Planetella Westwood, 1840^{i c g b}
- Platydiplosis ^{i c g}
- Plectrodiplosis ^{i c g}
- Polystepha Kieffer, 1897^{i c g b}
- Primavera ^{b}
- Procystiphora ^{i c g}
- Prodiplosis Felt, 1908^{i c g b}
- Protaplonyx ^{i c g}
- Putoniella ^{i c g}
- Rabdophaga Westwood, 1847^{i c g b}
- Resseliella Seitner, 1906^{i c g b}
- Rhizomyia ^{i c g}
- Rhopalomyia Rübsaamen, 1892^{i c g b}
- Sackenomyia Felt, 1908^{i c g b}
- Schismatodiplosis Rübsaamen, 1916
- Schizomyia Kieffer, 1889^{i c g b}
- Semudobia ^{i c g}
- Sequoiomyia ^{i c g}
- Silvestrina ^{i g}
- Sitodiplosis ^{i c g}
- Stephomyia Tavares, 1916^{i c g b}
- Stomatosema Kieffer, 1904^{i c g}
- Tanaodiplosis ^{i c g}
- Taxodiomyia Gagne, 1968^{i c g b} (cypress gall midges)
- Thaumadiplosis ^{i c g}
- Thecodiplosis Kieffer, 1895^{i c g b}
- Thripsobremia ^{i c g}
- Trisopsis ^{i c g}
- Trogodiplosis ^{i c g}
- Tropidiplosis ^{i c g}
- Trotteria Kieffer, 1901^{i c g b}
- Vitisiella Fedotova & Kovalev, 2003^{c g b}
- Walshomyia Felt, 1908^{i c g b}
- Xylodiplosis ^{i c g}
- Youngomyia ^{i c g}
- Zeuxidiplosis ^{i c g}

Data sources: i = ITIS, c = Catalogue of Life, g = GBIF, b = Bugguide.net

=== Cecidomyiini ===
This is a list of genera in the tribe Cecidomyiini, a tribe of the subfamily Cecidomyiinae. These 46 genera belong to the tribe Cecidomyiini:

- Ancylodiplosis^{i c g}
- Apagodiplosis^{i c g b}
- Blaesodiplosis^{i c g b}
- Bremia^{i c g}
- Caryomyia^{i c g b} (hickory gall midges)
- Cecidomyia^{i g b} (pine pitch midges)
- Coccidomyia^{i c g}
- Contarinia Rondani, 1860^{i c g b}
- Coquillettomyia^{i c g b}
- Cordylodiplosis^{i c g}
- Ctenodactylomyia^{i c g}
- Diadiplosis^{i c g}
- Endaphis^{i c g}
- Epidiplosis^{i c g}
- Glenodiplosis^{i c g}
- Gongrodiplosis^{i c g}
- Halodiplosis^{i c g}
- Harmandia^{i g b}
- Homobremia^{i c g}
- Kalodiplosis^{i g}
- Karshomyia^{i c g b}
- Lobodiplosis^{i g}
- Lobopteromyia^{i c g}
- Macrodiplosis^{i c g b}
- Monarthropalpus^{i c g b}
- Obolodiplosis^{i c g b}
- Olpodiplosis^{i c g b}
- Paradiplosis^{i c g b}
- Pilodiplosis^{i c g b}
- Pinyonia^{i c g b}
- Pitydiplosis^{i c g}
- Planetella^{i c g b}
- Platydiplosis^{i c g}
- Plectrodiplosis^{i c g}
- Prodiplosis^{i c g b}
- Putoniella^{i c g}
- Resseliella^{i c g b}
- Sequoiomyia^{i c g}
- Tanaodiplosis^{i c g}
- Taxodiomyia^{i c g b} (cypress gall midges)
- Thaumadiplosis^{i c g}
- Thecodiplosis^{i c g b}
- Trogodiplosis^{i c g}
- Xylodiplosis^{i c g}
- Youngomyia^{i c g}
- Zeuxidiplosis^{i c g}

Data sources: i = ITIS, c = Catalogue of Life, g = GBIF, b = Bugguide.net
