= Thecodiplosis brachynteroides =

Scientific classification
- Domain: Eukaryota
- Kingdom: Animalia
- Phylum: Arthropoda
- Class: Insecta
- Order: Diptera
- Family: Cecidomyiidae
- Supertribe: Cecidomyiidi
- Tribe: Cecidomyiini
- Genus: Thecodiplosis
- Species: T. brachynteroides

Binomial name
- Thecodiplosis brachynteroides (Osten Sacken, 1863)

Synonyms
- Cecidomyia brachynteroides Osten Sacken, 1862

Species of fly

Thecodiplosis brachynteroides is a species of gall midges, insects in the family Cecidomyiidae.
