= Paradiplosis tumifex =

Scientific classification
- Domain: Eukaryota
- Kingdom: Animalia
- Phylum: Arthropoda
- Class: Insecta
- Order: Diptera
- Family: Cecidomyiidae
- Supertribe: Cecidomyiidi
- Tribe: Cecidomyiini
- Genus: Paradiplosis
- Species: P. tumifex

Binomial name
- Paradiplosis tumifex Gagne, 1978

Species of fly

Paradiplosis tumifex, the balsam gall midge, is a species of gall midges, insects in the family Cecidomyiidae.
