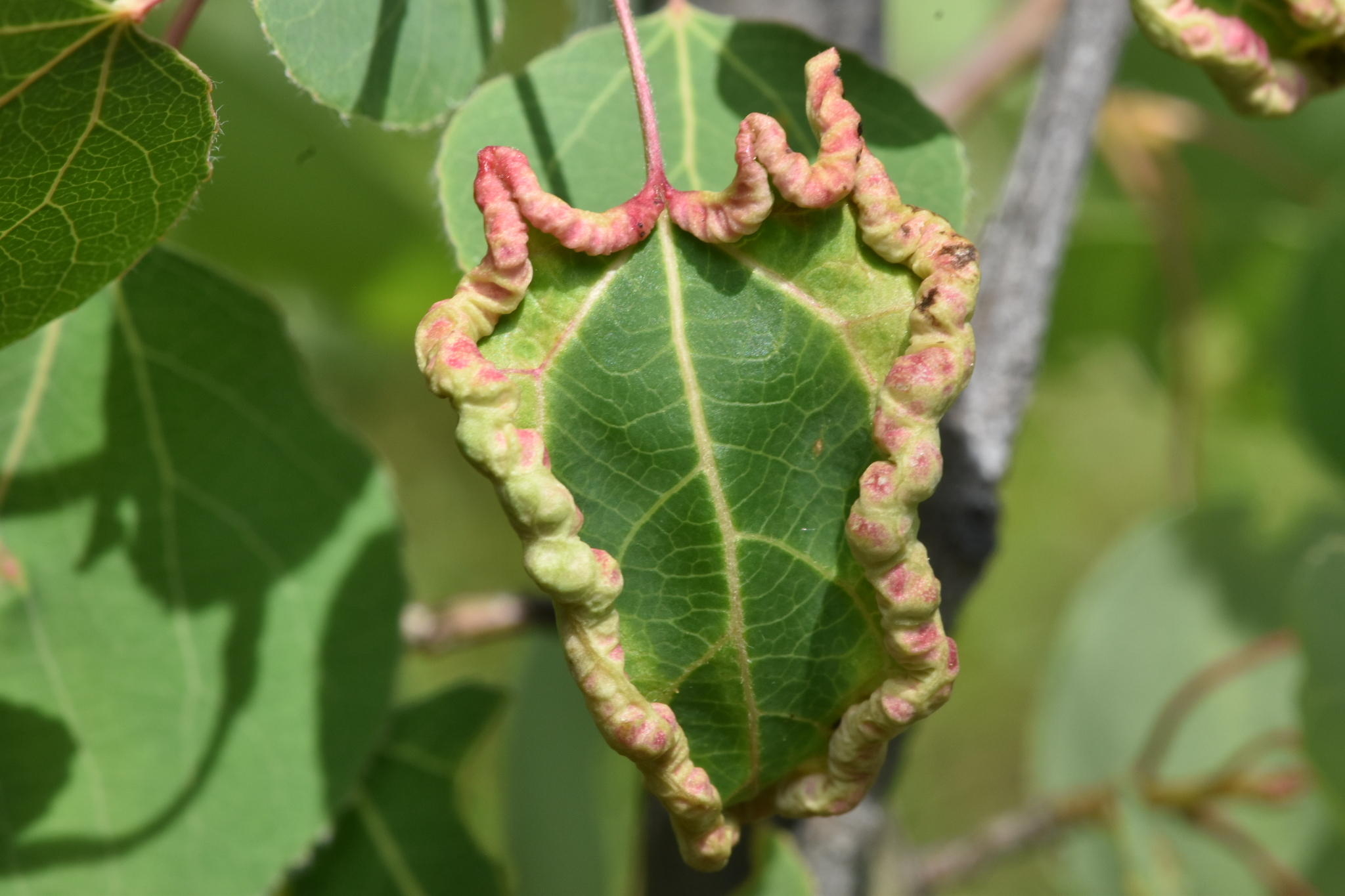
- Leaf galls caused by Prodiplosis morrisi

Scientific classification
- Domain: Eukaryota
- Kingdom: Animalia
- Phylum: Arthropoda
- Class: Insecta
- Order: Diptera
- Family: Cecidomyiidae
- Subfamily: Cecidomyiinae
- Supertribe: Cecidomyiidi
- Tribe: Cecidomyiini
- Genus: Prodiplosis; Felt, 1908

= Prodiplosis =

Genus of flies

Prodiplosis is a genus of gall midges, insects in the family Cecidomyiidae. There are about 11 described species in Prodiplosis.

== Species ==
These 11 species belong to the genus Prodiplosis:

- Prodiplosis citrulli (Felt, 1935)^{i c g}
- Prodiplosis falcata Gagne, 1986^{i c g}
- Prodiplosis floricola (Felt, 1907)^{i c g}
- Prodiplosis longifila Gagne, 1986^{i c g}
- Prodiplosis morrisi Gagne, 1966^{i c g}
- Prodiplosis myricae (Beutenmuller, 1907)^{i c g}
- Prodiplosis platani Gagne, 1986^{i c g}
- Prodiplosis rhenana (Rübsaamen, 1910)^{c g}
- Prodiplosis spatulata Jaiswal, 1989^{c g}
- Prodiplosis vaccinii (Felt, 1926)^{i c g}
- Prodiplosis violicola (Coquillett, 1900)^{i c g b}

Data sources: i = ITIS, c = Catalogue of Life, g = GBIF, b = Bugguide.net
