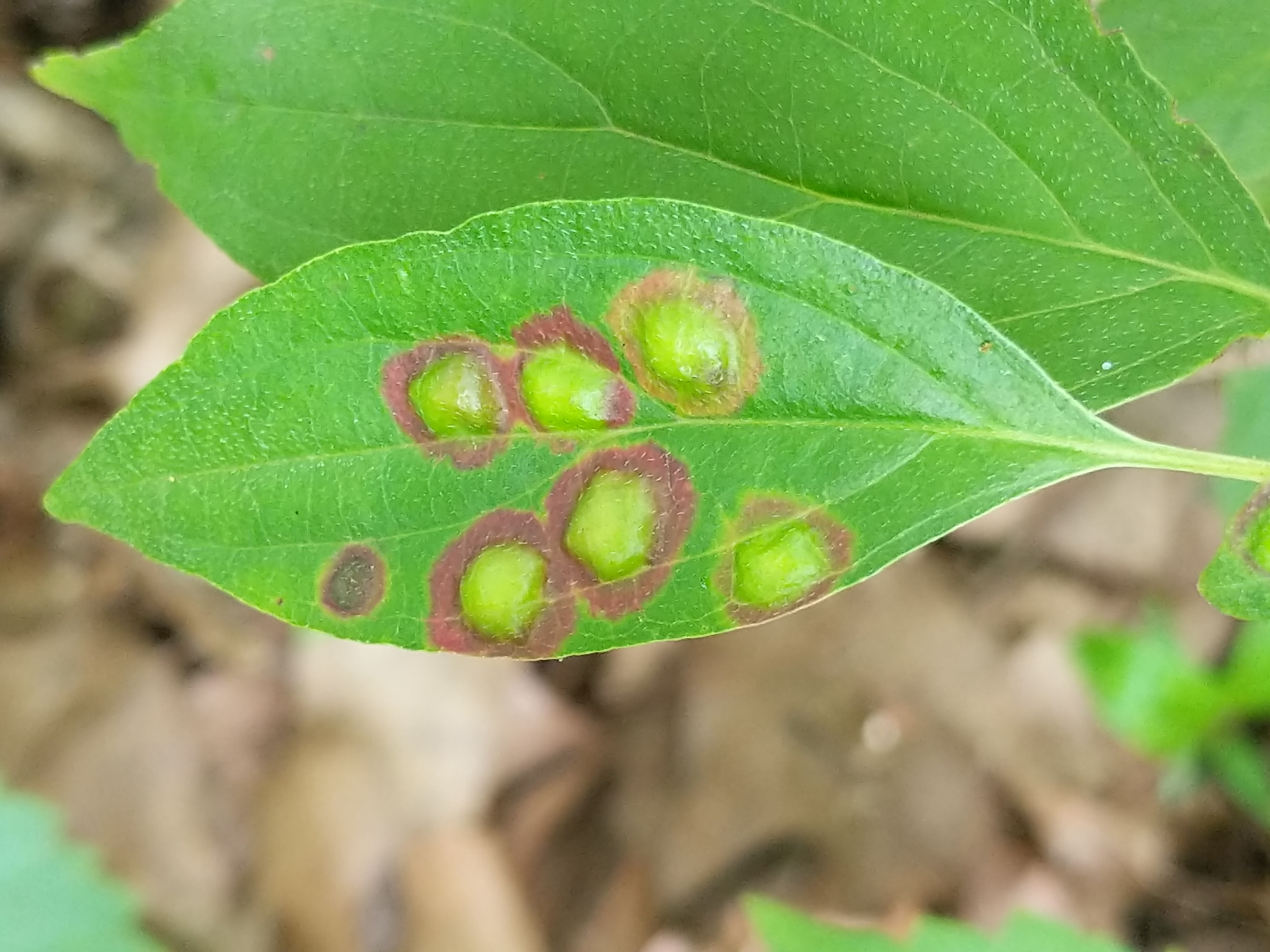

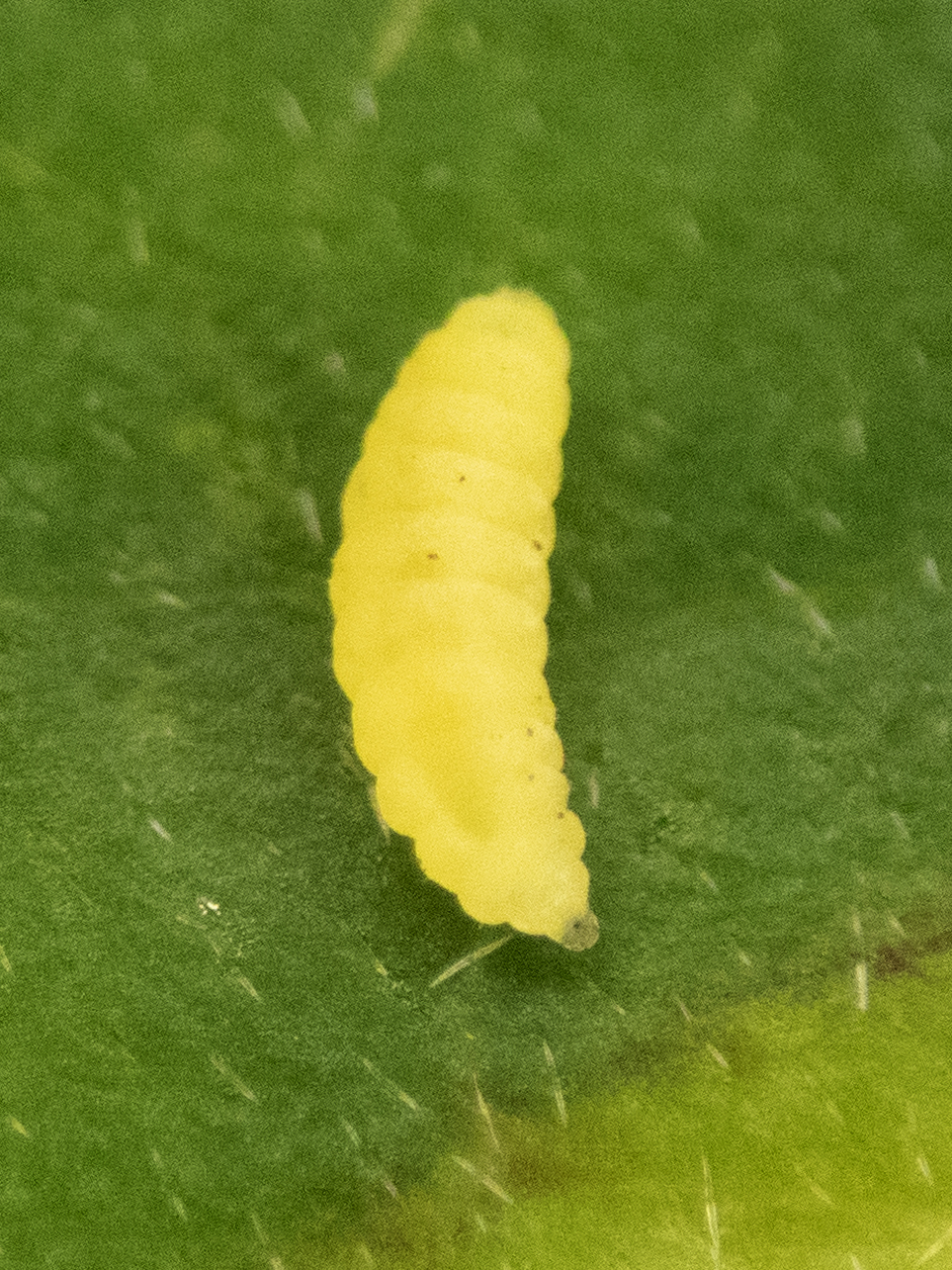
- Leaf galls (top) and larva (bottom)

Scientific classification
- Domain: Eukaryota
- Kingdom: Animalia
- Phylum: Arthropoda
- Class: Insecta
- Order: Diptera
- Family: Cecidomyiidae
- Supertribe: Cecidomyiidi
- Genus: Parallelodiplosis
- Species: P. subtruncata

Binomial name
- Parallelodiplosis subtruncata (Felt, 1907)

Synonyms
- Cecidomyia subtruncata Felt, 1907

= Parallelodiplosis subtruncata =

Species of fly

Parallelodiplosis subtruncata is a species of gall midges, insects in the family Cecidomyiidae.
