= Astictoneura muhlenbergiae =

Scientific classification
- Domain: Eukaryota
- Kingdom: Animalia
- Phylum: Arthropoda
- Class: Insecta
- Order: Diptera
- Family: Cecidomyiidae
- Subfamily: Cecidomyiinae
- Tribe: Alycaulini
- Genus: Astictoneura
- Species: A. muhlenbergiae

Binomial name
- Astictoneura muhlenbergiae (Marten, 1893)

Synonyms
- Lasioptera carbonitens Cockerell, 1902; Lasioptera muhlenbergiae Marten, 1893

Species of fly

Astictoneura muhlenbergiae is a species of gall midges in the family Cecidomyiidae.
