= Massalongia =

Massalongia is the scientific name of two genera of organisms and may refer to:

- Massalongia (fly), a genus of insects in the family Cecidomyiidae
- Massalongia (fungus), a genus of fungi in the family Massalongiaceae
