= Dicrodiplosis californica =

Scientific classification
- Domain: Eukaryota
- Kingdom: Animalia
- Phylum: Arthropoda
- Class: Insecta
- Order: Diptera
- Family: Cecidomyiidae
- Supertribe: Cecidomyiidi
- Genus: Dicrodiplosis
- Species: D. californica

Binomial name
- Dicrodiplosis californica Felt, 1912

Species of fly

Dicrodiplosis californica, the mealybug-destroying predaceous gall midge, is a species of gall midges in the family Cecidomyiidae.
