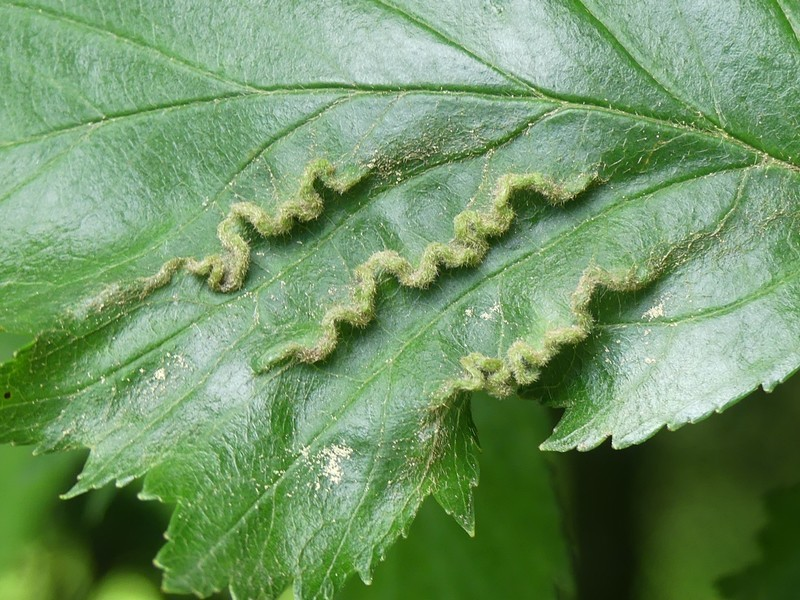
- Leaf galls caused by Blaesodiplosis crataegifolia

Scientific classification
- Domain: Eukaryota
- Kingdom: Animalia
- Phylum: Arthropoda
- Class: Insecta
- Order: Diptera
- Family: Cecidomyiidae
- Supertribe: Cecidomyiidi
- Genus: Blaesodiplosis
- Species: B. crataegifolia

Binomial name
- Blaesodiplosis crataegifolia (Felt, 1907)

Synonyms
- Hormomyia crataegifolia Felt, 1907

= Blaesodiplosis crataegifolia =

Species of fly

Blaesodiplosis crataegifolia is a species of gall midges in the family Cecidomyiidae.
