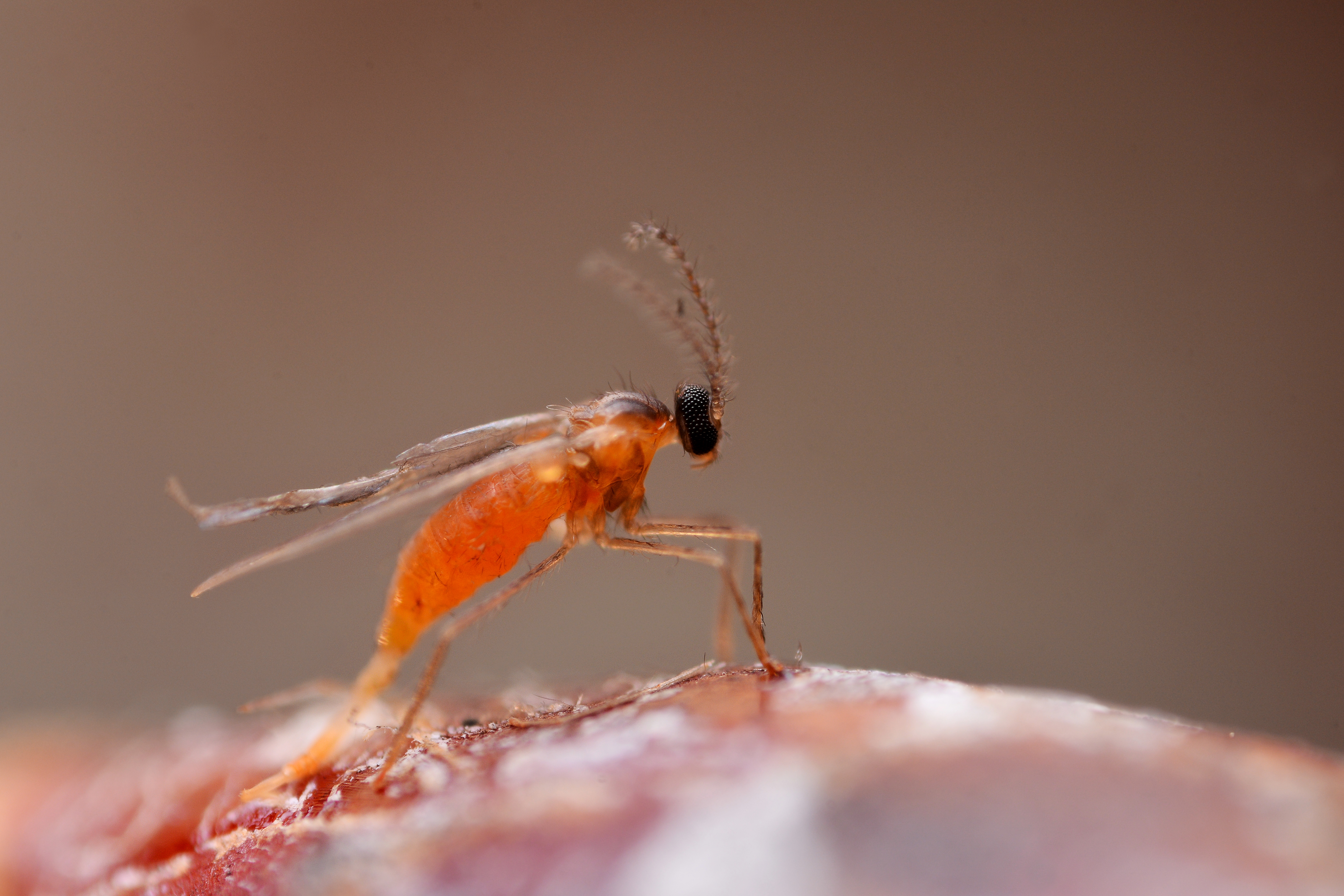

Scientific classification
- Kingdom: Animalia
- Phylum: Arthropoda
- Class: Insecta
- Order: Diptera
- Family: Cecidomyiidae
- Subfamily: Cecidomyiinae
- Supertribe: Cecidomyiidi
- Tribe: Cecidomyiini

= Cecidomyiini =

Tribe of flies

Cecidomyiini is a tribe of gall midges in the family Cecidomyiidae. There are at least 220 described species in Cecidomyiini.

== Genera ==
- Acodiplosis Kieffer, 1895
- Ametrodiplosis Rübsaamen, 1910
- Anabremia Kieffer, 1912
- Anisostephus Rübsaamen, 1917
- Antichiridium Rübsaamen, 1911
- Aphidoletes Kieffer, 1904
- Arthrocnodax Rübsaamen, 1895
- Atrichosema Kieffer, 1904
- Blastodiplosis Kieffer, 1912
- Camptodiplosis Kieffer, 1912
- Cecidomyia Fischer von Waldheim\nMeigen, 1803
- Clinodiplosis Kieffer, 1894
- Contarinia Rondani, 1860
- Coquillettomyia Felt, 1908
- Dichodiplosis Rübsaamen, 1910
- Diodaulus Rübsaamen, 1917
- Drisina Giard, 1893
- Endaphis Kieffer, 1896
- Endopsylla de Meijere, 1907
- Feltiella Rübsaamen, 1910
- Geodiplosis Kieffer, 1909
- Giardomyia Felt, 1908
- Hadrobremia Kieffer, 1912
- Haplodiplosis Rübsaamen, 1910
- Harmandiola Skuhravá, 1997
- Hygrodiplosis Kieffer, 1912
- Lestodiplosis Kieffer, 1894
- Loewiola Kieffer, 1896
- Macrodiplosis Kieffer, 1895
- Mamaevia Skuhravá, 1967
- Massalongia Kieffer, 1897
- Monarthropalpus Rübsaamen, 1892
- Monobremia Kieffer, 1912
- Monodiplosis Rübsaamen, 1910
- Mycocecis Edwards, 1922
- Mycodiplosis Rübsaamen, 1895
- Myricomyia Kieffer, 1900
- Octodiplosis Giard, 1894
- Parallelodiplosis Rübsaamen, 1910
- Planetella Westwood, 1840
- Plemeliella Seitner, 1908
- Putoniella Kieffer, 1896
- Resseliella Seitner, 1906
- Silvestriola Skuhravá, 1997
- Sitodiplosis Kieffer, 1913
- Stenodiplosis Reuter, 1895
- Thecodiplosis Kieffer, 1895
- Tricholaba Rübsaamen, 1917
- Xenodiplosis Felt, 1911
- Xylodiplosis Kieffer, 1894
- Zeuxidiplosis Kieffer, 1904

See also

- List of Cecidomyiini genera
