= Taxodiomyia taxodii =

Scientific classification
- Domain: Eukaryota
- Kingdom: Animalia
- Phylum: Arthropoda
- Class: Insecta
- Order: Diptera
- Family: Cecidomyiidae
- Genus: Taxodiomyia
- Species: T. taxodii

Binomial name
- Taxodiomyia taxodii (Felt, 1911)

Synonyms
- Itonida taxodii Felt, 1911

Species of fly

Taxodiomyia taxodii, the cypress leaf gall midge, is a species of gall midges, insects in the family Cecidomyiidae.
