= Bremia =

Bremia may refer to:

- Bremia (fly), a genus of flies in the family Cecidomyiidae
- Bremia (protist), a genus of protists in the family Peronosporaceae
- Bremia (fort), fort in Wales
