= Cecidomyia elegans =

Scientific classification
- Kingdom: Animalia
- Phylum: Arthropoda
- Class: Insecta
- Order: Diptera
- Family: Cecidomyiidae
- Genus: Cecidomyia
- Species: C. elegans

Binomial name
- Cecidomyia elegans Winnertz, 1853

Species of fly

Cecidomyia elegans is a species of gall midges in the tribe Cecidomyiini. It is found in Germany.
