= Anabremia inquilina =

Scientific classification
- Domain: Eukaryota
- Kingdom: Animalia
- Phylum: Arthropoda
- Class: Insecta
- Order: Diptera
- Family: Cecidomyiidae
- Genus: Anabremia
- Species: A. inquilina

Binomial name
- Anabremia inquilina Solinas, 1965

Species of gall midge

Anabremia inquilina is a gall midge and a member of the genus Anabremia. This species was first described from Italy in 1965. It is an inquiline of another gall midge - Jaapiella medicaginis - which makes galls on Medicago species.
