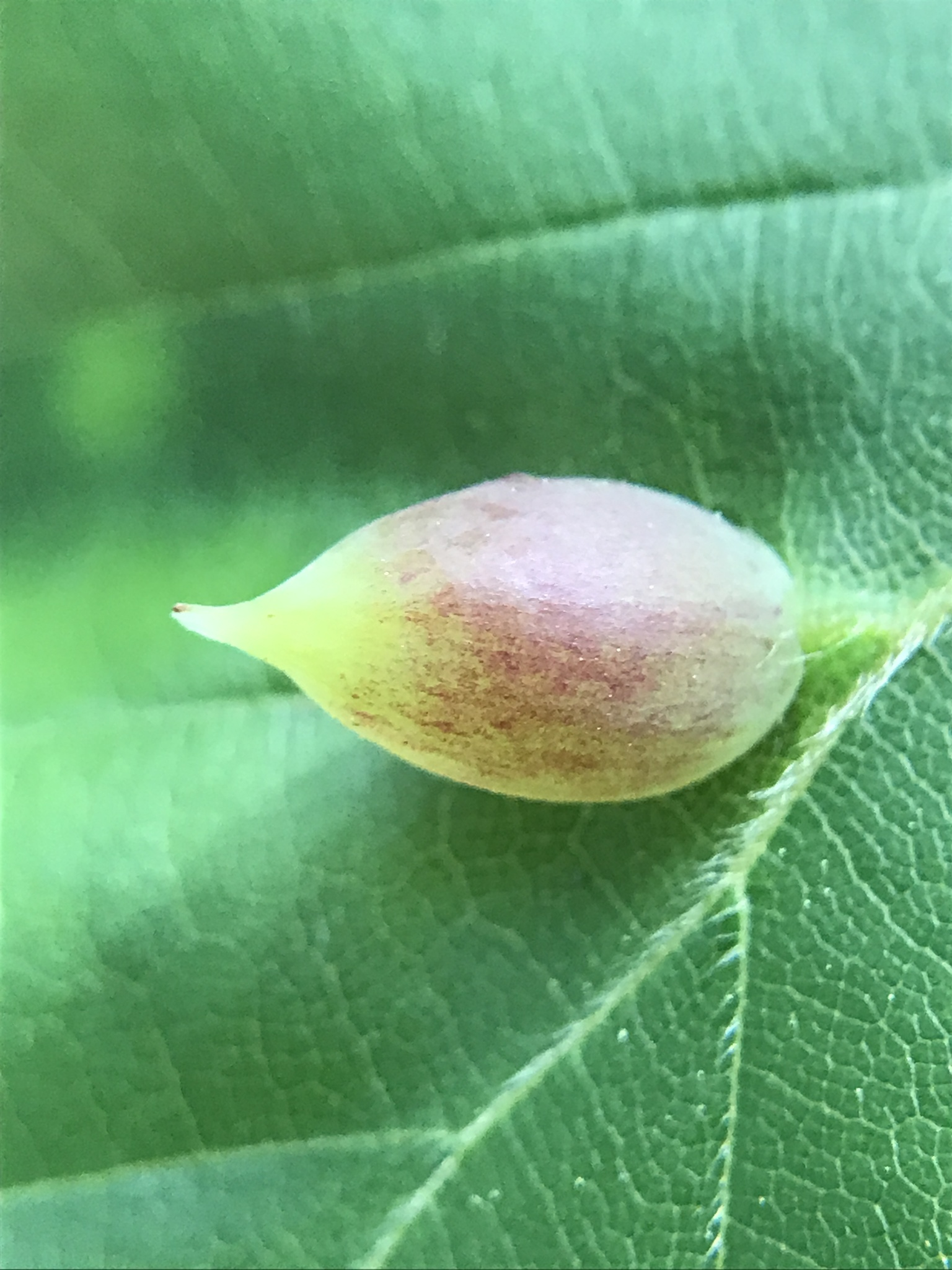
- Gall formed by Mikiola fagi

Scientific classification
- Kingdom: Animalia
- Phylum: Arthropoda
- Clade: Pancrustacea
- Class: Insecta
- Order: Diptera
- Family: Cecidomyiidae
- Genus: Mikiola
- Species: M. fagi

Binomial name
- Mikiola fagi (Hartig, 1839)

= Mikiola fagi =

Species of fly

Mikiola fagi, the beech gall midge is a gall-causing fly in the family Cecidomyiidae. This species was first described by Theodor Hartig in 1839.

== Range ==
According to observations of the species aggregated on GBIF, this fly spreads across Europe.
