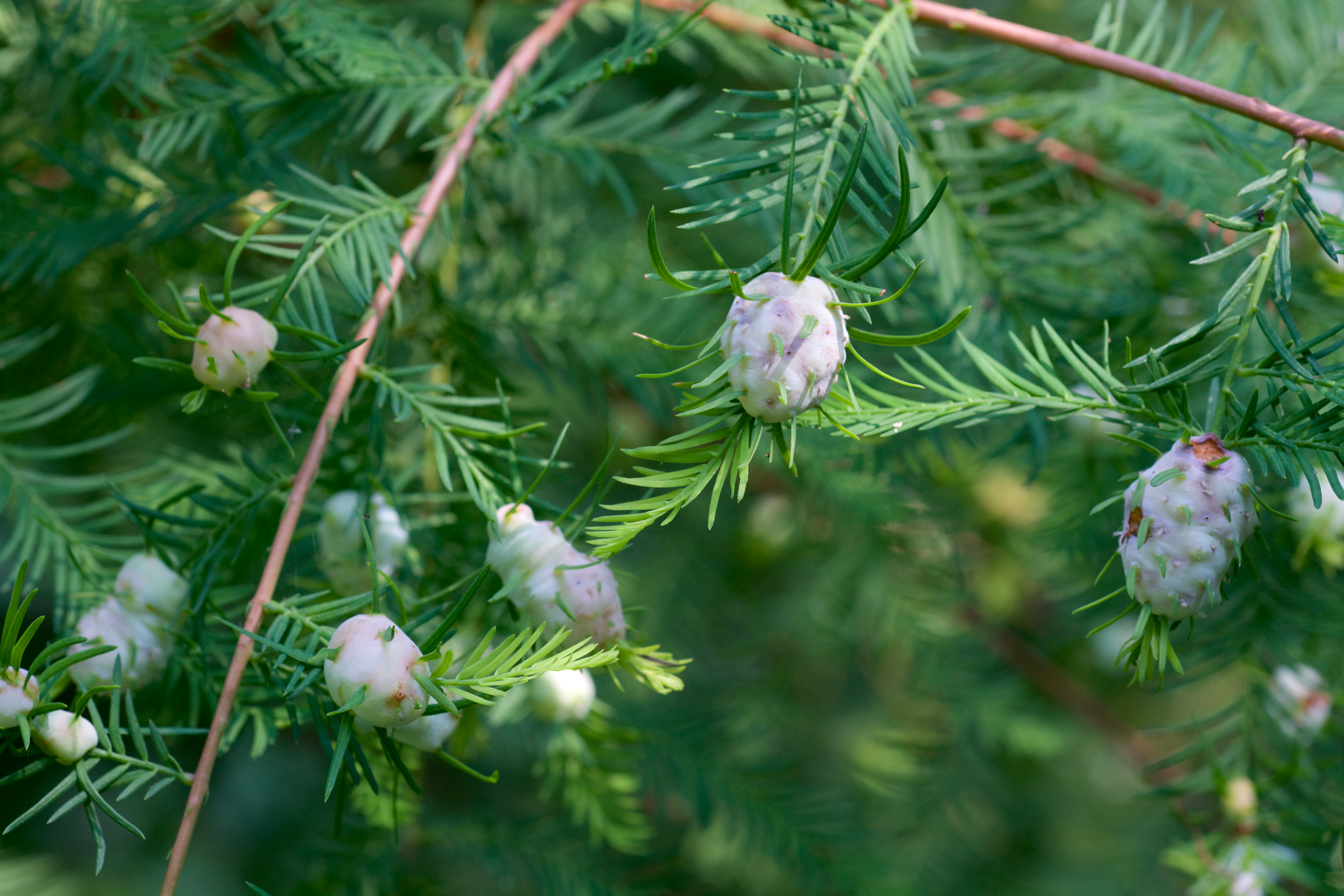
- Galls caused by T. cupressiananassa

Scientific classification
- Domain: Eukaryota
- Kingdom: Animalia
- Phylum: Arthropoda
- Class: Insecta
- Order: Diptera
- Family: Cecidomyiidae
- Genus: Taxodiomyia
- Species: T. cupressiananassa

Binomial name
- Taxodiomyia cupressiananassa (Osten-Sacken, 1878)

Synonyms
- Cecidomyia cupressiananassa Osten Sacken, 1878

= Taxodiomyia cupressiananassa =

Species of fly

Taxodiomyia cupressiananassa, commonly known as the cypress twig gall midge, is a species of gall midge in the family Cecidomyiidae.
