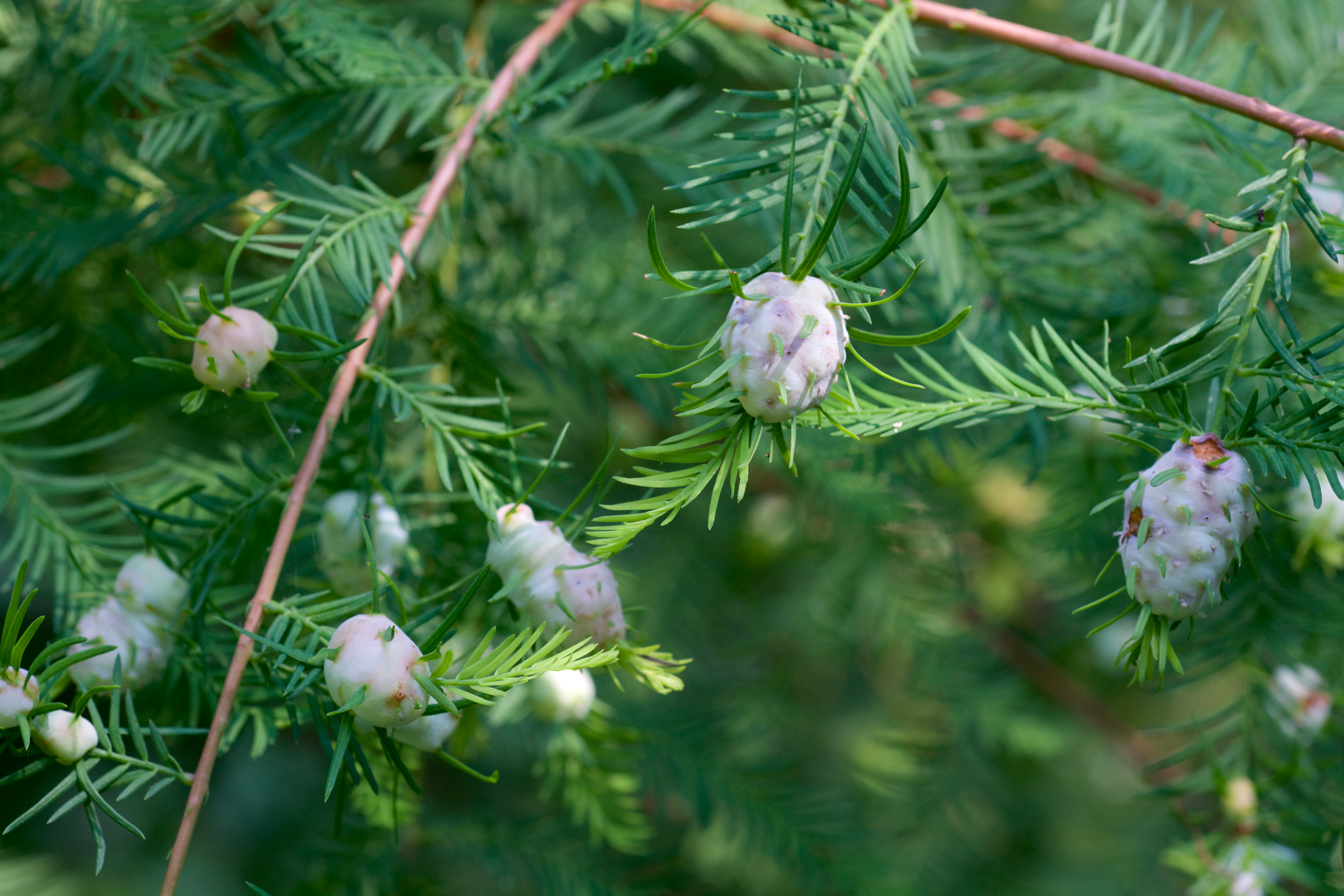
- Taxodiomyia cupressiananassa

Scientific classification
- Domain: Eukaryota
- Kingdom: Animalia
- Phylum: Arthropoda
- Class: Insecta
- Order: Diptera
- Family: Cecidomyiidae
- Supertribe: Cecidomyiidi
- Tribe: Cecidomyiini
- Genus: Taxodiomyia; Gagne, 1968

= Taxodiomyia =

Genus of flies

Taxodiomyia is a genus of cypress gall midges, insects in the family Cecidomyiidae. There are at least 3 described species in Taxodiomyia.

== Species ==
- Taxodiomyia cupressi (Schweinitz, 1822)
- Taxodiomyia cupressiananassa (Osten Sacken, 1878)
- Taxodiomyia taxodii (Felt, 1911) (cypress leaf gall midge)
