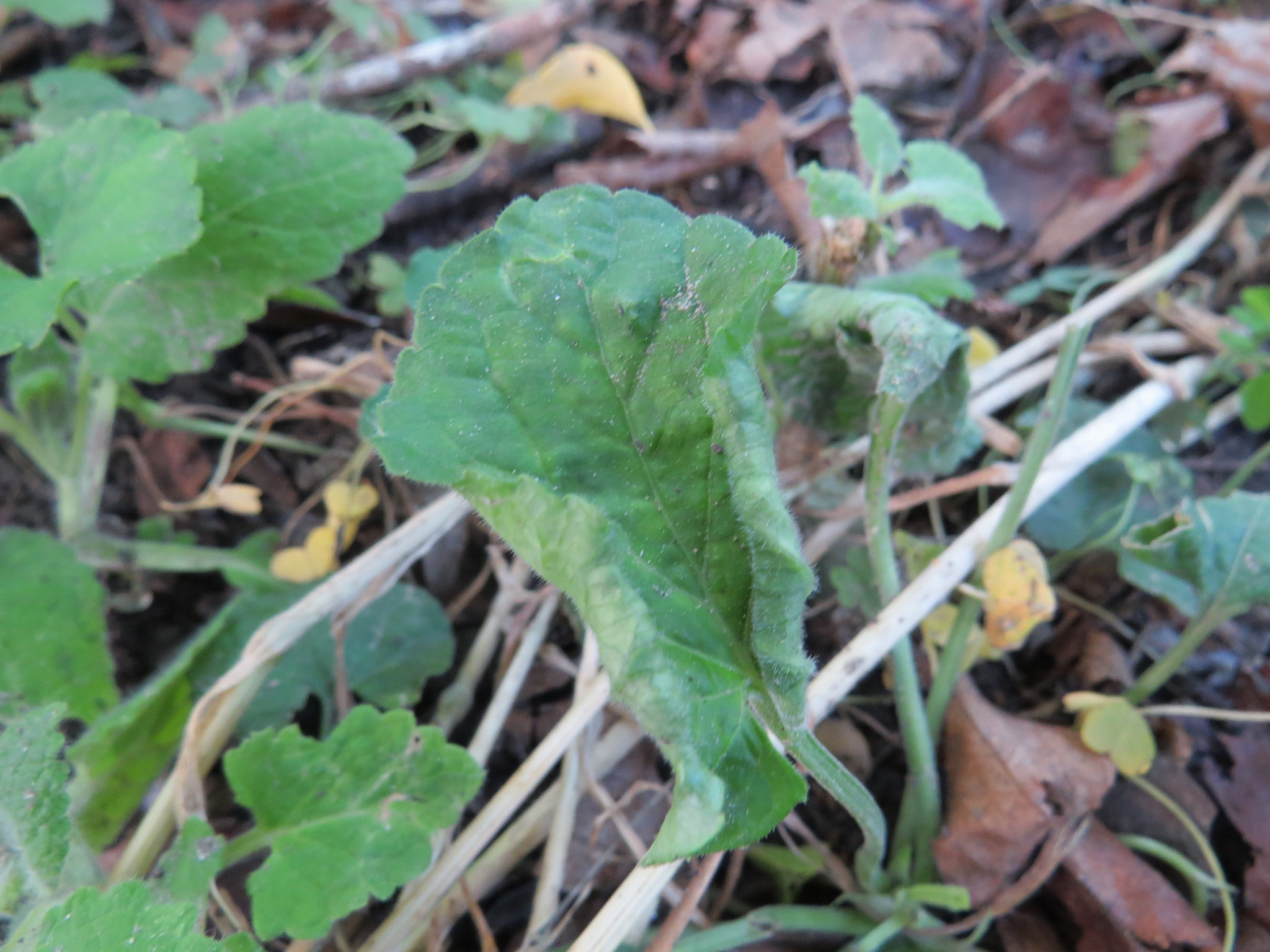
- Leaf galls caused by Prodiplosis violicola

Scientific classification
- Domain: Eukaryota
- Kingdom: Animalia
- Phylum: Arthropoda
- Class: Insecta
- Order: Diptera
- Family: Cecidomyiidae
- Genus: Prodiplosis
- Species: P. violicola

Binomial name
- Prodiplosis violicola (Coquillett, 1900)

Synonyms
- Diplosis violicola Coquillett, 1900

= Prodiplosis violicola =

Species of fly

Prodiplosis violicola is a species of gall midges, insects in the family Cecidomyiidae.
