= Massalongia rubra =

Scientific classification
- Kingdom: Animalia
- Phylum: Arthropoda
- Class: Insecta
- Order: Diptera
- Family: Cecidomyiidae
- Genus: Massalongia
- Species: M. rubra

Binomial name
- Massalongia rubra (Kieffer, 1890)

Species of fly

Massalongia rubra is a species of gall midge which forms galls in the leaves of birch. It was first described by the French naturalist and entomologist, Jean-Jacques Kieffer in 1890 and is found in Europe.

== Description of the gall ==
An elongate, woody swelling (up to 10 mm long) of the mid-rib of a leaf which can extend into the base of lateral veins and the petiole. The gall is more prominent on the underside of the leaf and is initially green, later red-purple and brown. Sometimes the gall is surrounded by a green island on a yellowing leaf. Each gall contains a single larve which are white or yellowish when young and red when mature, with a weak sternal spatula. Mature larva leave the gall in late summer to hibernate and pupate in the soil. Adults emerge in the following spring or summer.

Affected trees are silver birch (Betula pendula) and downy birch (Betula pubescens).

== Distribution ==
Massalongia rubra has been recorded from Belgium, Czech Republic, Germany, Great Britain, the Netherlands and Sweden.
