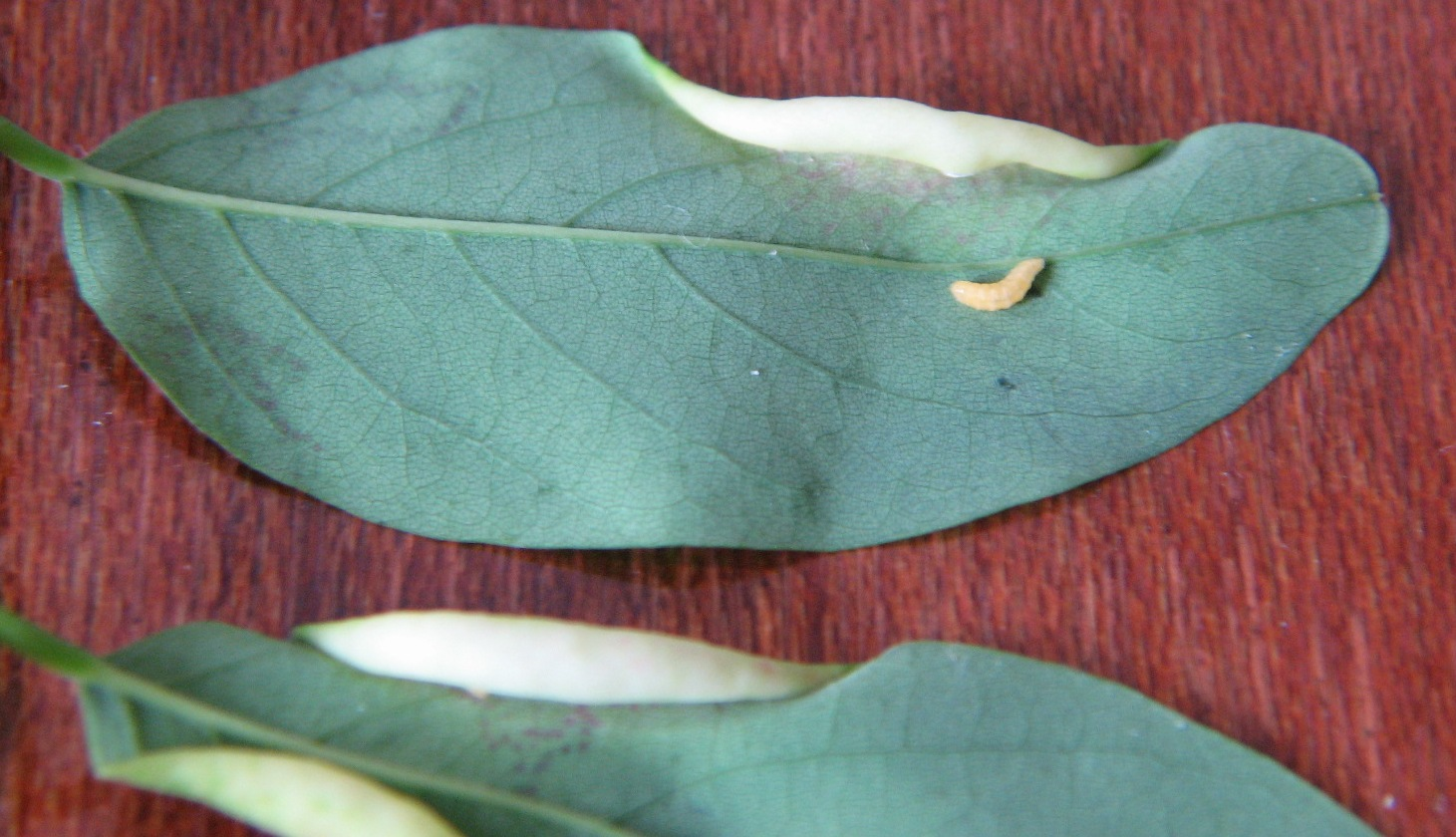
- Larva on locust leaf with gall

Scientific classification
- Kingdom: Animalia
- Phylum: Arthropoda
- Class: Insecta
- Order: Diptera
- Family: Cecidomyiidae
- Supertribe: Cecidomyiidi
- Genus: Obolodiplosis; Felt, 1908
- Species: O. robiniae

Binomial name
- Obolodiplosis robiniae (Haldeman, 1847)

= Obolodiplosis =

Obolodiplosis robiniae

Genus of flies

Obolodiplosis is a genus of gall midges (insects in the family Cecidomyiidae). It is monotypic, being represented by the single species Obolodiplosis robiniae, commonly known as the locust gall midge.
