= Paradiplosis =

Scientific classification
- Domain: Eukaryota
- Kingdom: Animalia
- Phylum: Arthropoda
- Class: Insecta
- Order: Diptera
- Family: Cecidomyiidae
- Subfamily: Cecidomyiinae
- Supertribe: Cecidomyiidi
- Tribe: Cecidomyiini
- Genus: Paradiplosis; Felt, 1908

Genus of flies

Paradiplosis is a genus of gall midges, insects in the family Cecidomyiidae. There are at least four described species in Paradiplosis.

== Species ==
These four species belong to the genus Paradiplosis:

- Paradiplosis abietispectinatae (Tubeuf, 1930)^{c g}
- Paradiplosis manii (Inouye, 1959)^{c g}
- Paradiplosis obesa (Felt, 1907)^{i c g}
- Paradiplosis tumifex Gagne, 1978^{i c g b} (balsam gall midge)

Data sources: i = ITIS, c = Catalogue of Life, g = GBIF, b = Bugguide.net
