= Apagodiplosis =

Scientific classification
- Kingdom: Animalia
- Phylum: Arthropoda
- Class: Insecta
- Order: Diptera
- Family: Cecidomyiidae
- Supertribe: Cecidomyiidi
- Genus: Apagodiplosis; Gagne, 1973

Genus of flies

Apagodiplosis is a genus of gall midges in the family Cecidomyiidae. There is one described species in Apagodiplosis, A. papyriferae.
