= Geriojennsa =

Scientific classification
- Domain: Eukaryota
- Kingdom: Animalia
- Phylum: Arthropoda
- Class: Insecta
- Order: Lepidoptera
- Superfamily: Noctuoidea
- Family: Erebidae
- Subfamily: Arctiinae
- Tribe: Lithosiini
- Genus: Geriojennsa; Watson, Fletcher & Nye, 1980
- Species: G. cunegunda

Binomial name
- Geriojennsa cunegunda (Schaus, 1924)

Synonyms
- Jorgensenia Schaus, 1924 (preocc.); Jorgensenia cunegunda Schaus, 1924

Genus of moths

Geriojennsa is a monotypic moth genus in the subfamily Arctiinae erected by Watson, Fletcher and Nye in 1980. Its single species, Geriojennsa cunegunda, was first described by William Schaus in 1924. It is found in Argentina.
