= Dicrodiplosis =

Scientific classification
- Domain: Eukaryota
- Kingdom: Animalia
- Phylum: Arthropoda
- Class: Insecta
- Order: Diptera
- Family: Cecidomyiidae
- Subfamily: Cecidomyiinae
- Supertribe: Cecidomyiidi
- Genus: Dicrodiplosis; Kieffer, 1895

Genus of flies

Dicrodiplosis is a genus of gall midges in the family Cecidomyiidae. There are about 15 described species in Dicrodiplosis.

== Species ==
These 15 species belong to the genus Dicrodiplosis:

- Dicrodiplosis antennata Felt, 1912^{i c g}
- Dicrodiplosis bifurcata Grover, 1979^{c g}
- Dicrodiplosis californica Felt, 1912^{i c g b} (mealybug-destroying predaceous gall midge)
- Dicrodiplosis coccidarum Felt, 1911^{c g}
- Dicrodiplosis cylindriformis Kashyap, 1988^{c g}
- Dicrodiplosis fasciata Kieffer, 1895^{c g}
- Dicrodiplosis fulva (Felt, 1915)^{c g}
- Dicrodiplosis guatemalensis Felt^{i c g}
- Dicrodiplosis kimberleyensis Harris, 1968^{c g}
- Dicrodiplosis manihoti Harris, 1981^{c g}
- Dicrodiplosis marikovskii Fedotova, 2006^{c g}
- Dicrodiplosis minuta Shinji, 1939^{c g}
- Dicrodiplosis multifila (Felt, 1908)^{c}
- Dicrodiplosis pseudococci (Felt, 1914)^{c g}
- Dicrodiplosis quercina Felt, 1907^{i c g}

Data sources: i = ITIS, c = Catalogue of Life, g = GBIF, b = Bugguide.net
