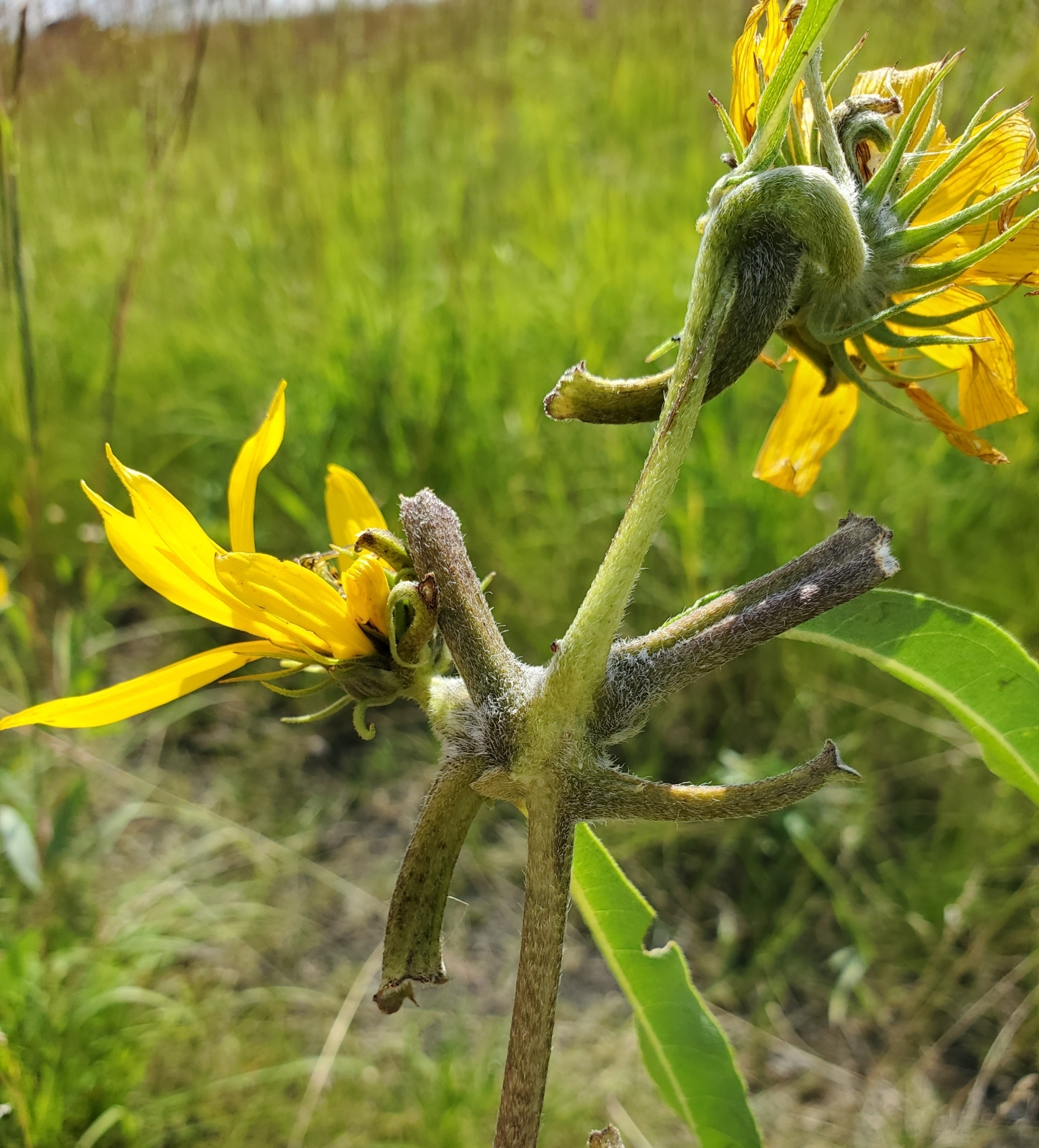
- Galls of Olpodiplosis helianthi

Scientific classification
- Domain: Eukaryota
- Kingdom: Animalia
- Phylum: Arthropoda
- Class: Insecta
- Order: Diptera
- Family: Cecidomyiidae
- Supertribe: Cecidomyiidi
- Genus: Olpodiplosis; Gagne, 1973
- Species: O. helianthi

Binomial name
- Olpodiplosis helianthi (Brodie, 1894)

= Olpodiplosis =

Genus of flies

Olpodiplosis is a monotypic genus of gall midges, insects in the family Cecidomyiidae. The only described species is Olpodiplosis helianthi.

This species occurs in North America and induces flask-shaped galls on several species of sunflower. The inducers over-winter in the galls, emerging as adults the following spring.

The species was first described as Diplosis helianthi by entomologist William Brodie in 1894, but moved to Olpodiplosis by Raymond Gagné in 1973.
