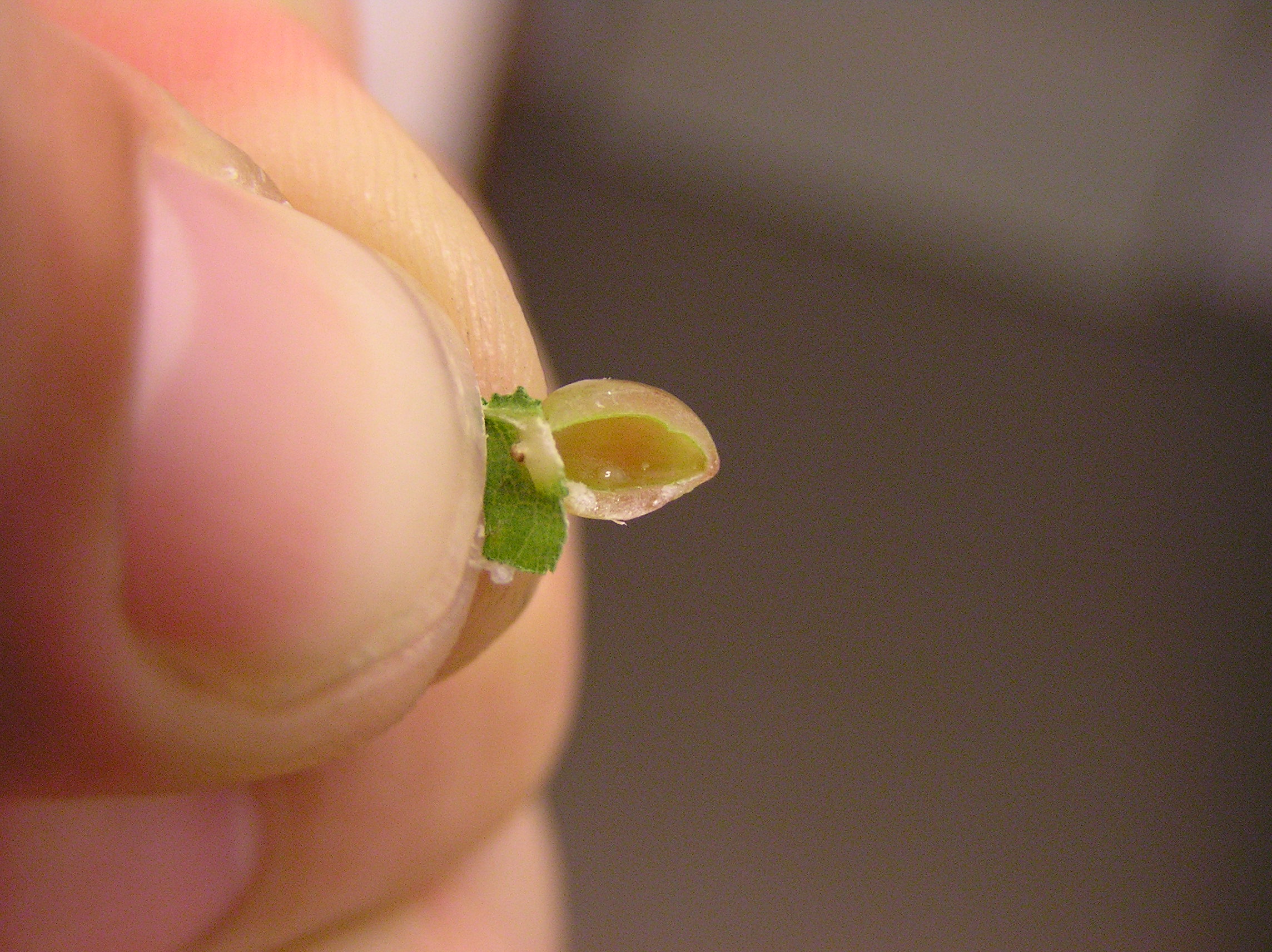
- Mikiola fagi

Scientific classification
- Domain: Eukaryota
- Kingdom: Animalia
- Phylum: Arthropoda
- Class: Insecta
- Order: Diptera
- Family: Cecidomyiidae
- Genus: Mikiola; Kieffer, 1896

= Mikiola =

Genus of flies

Mikiola is a genus of flies belonging to the family Cecidomyiidae.

The species of this genus are found in Europe.

== Species ==
Species:

- Mikiola bassiaflorae Mani, 1986
- Mikiola bicornis Sato & Yukawa, 2009
- Mikiola cristata Kieffer, 1898
- Mikiola fagi (Hartig, 1839)
- Mikiola orientalis Kieffer, 1909
- Mikiola populi (Shinji, 1938)
- Mikiola populicola (Shinji, 1938)
