= Thecodiplosis =

Scientific classification
- Domain: Eukaryota
- Kingdom: Animalia
- Phylum: Arthropoda
- Class: Insecta
- Order: Diptera
- Family: Cecidomyiidae
- Subfamily: Cecidomyiinae
- Supertribe: Cecidomyiidi
- Tribe: Cecidomyiini
- Genus: Thecodiplosis; Kieffer, 1895

Genus of flies

Thecodiplosis is a genus of gall midges, insects in the family Cecidomyiidae. There are about six described species in Thecodiplosis.

== Species ==
These six species belong to the genus Thecodiplosis:

- Thecodiplosis brachyntera (Schwagrichen, 1835)^{c g}
- Thecodiplosis brachynteroides (Osten Sacken, 1863)^{i c g b}
- Thecodiplosis japonensis Uchida & Inouye, 1955^{c g}
- Thecodiplosis piniradiatae (Snow and Mills, 1900)^{i c g}
- Thecodiplosis piniresinosae Kearby, 1963^{i c g}
- Thecodiplosis pinirigidae (Packard, 1878)^{i c g}

Data sources: i = ITIS, c = Catalogue of Life, g = GBIF, b = Bugguide.net
