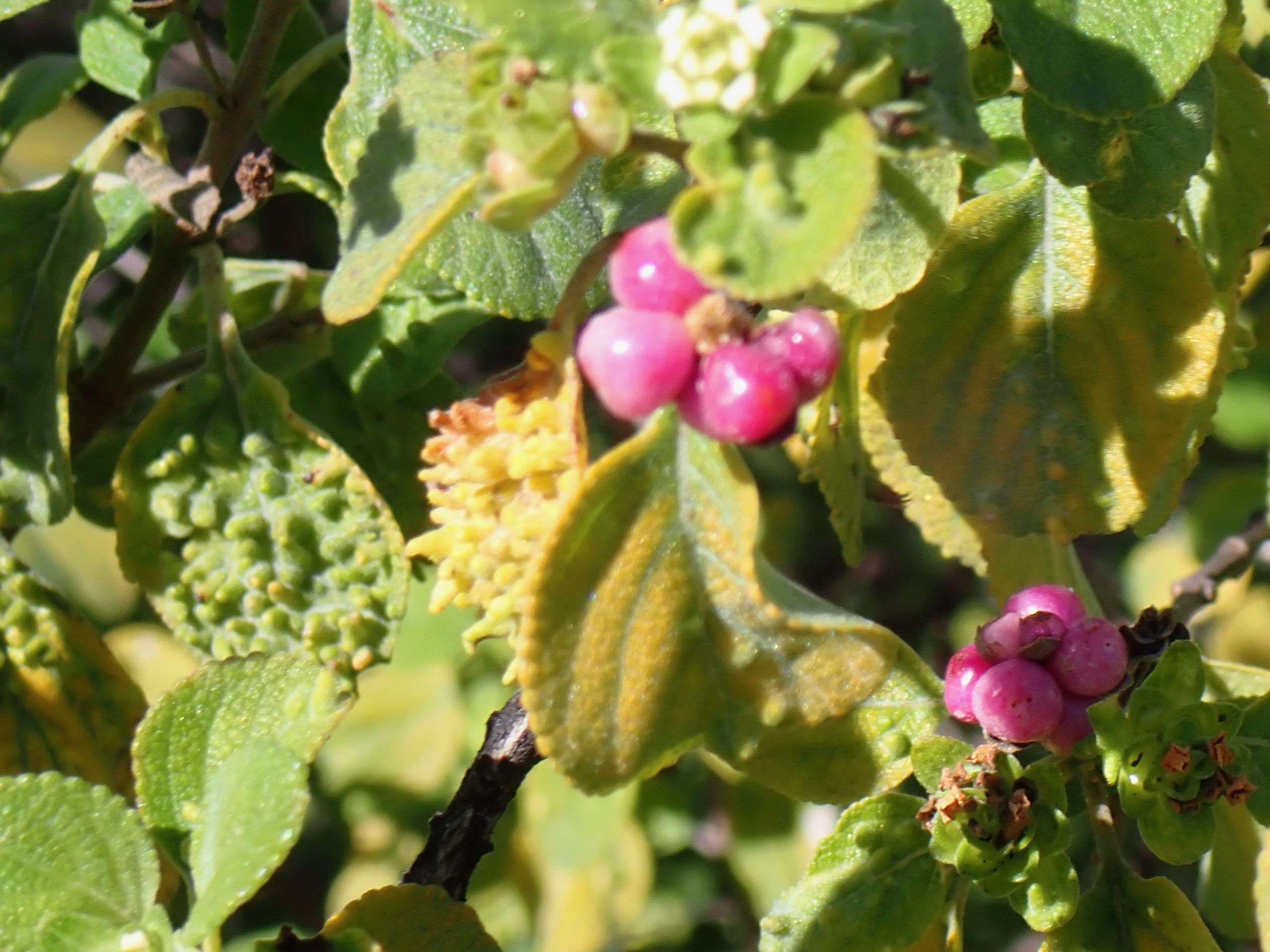
- Galls of Schismatodiplosis lantanae on the leaves of a Lantana involucrata on Great Harbour Cay, The Bahamas

Scientific classification
- Kingdom: Animalia
- Phylum: Arthropoda
- Class: Insecta
- Order: Diptera
- Family: Cecidomyiidae
- Subfamily: Cecidomyiinae
- Supertribe: Cecidomyiidi
- Tribe: Clinodiplosini
- Genus: Schismatodiplosis; Rübsaamen, 1916

Type species
- Clinodiplosis lantanae Rübsaamen, 1908

= Schismatodiplosis =

Genus of flies

Schismatodiplosis is genus of flies in the family of gall midges Cecidomyiidae.

== Species ==
Some species of this genus are:

- Schismatodiplosis lantanae (Rübsaamen, 1908)
- Schismatodiplosis marctiae Tavares, 1917
