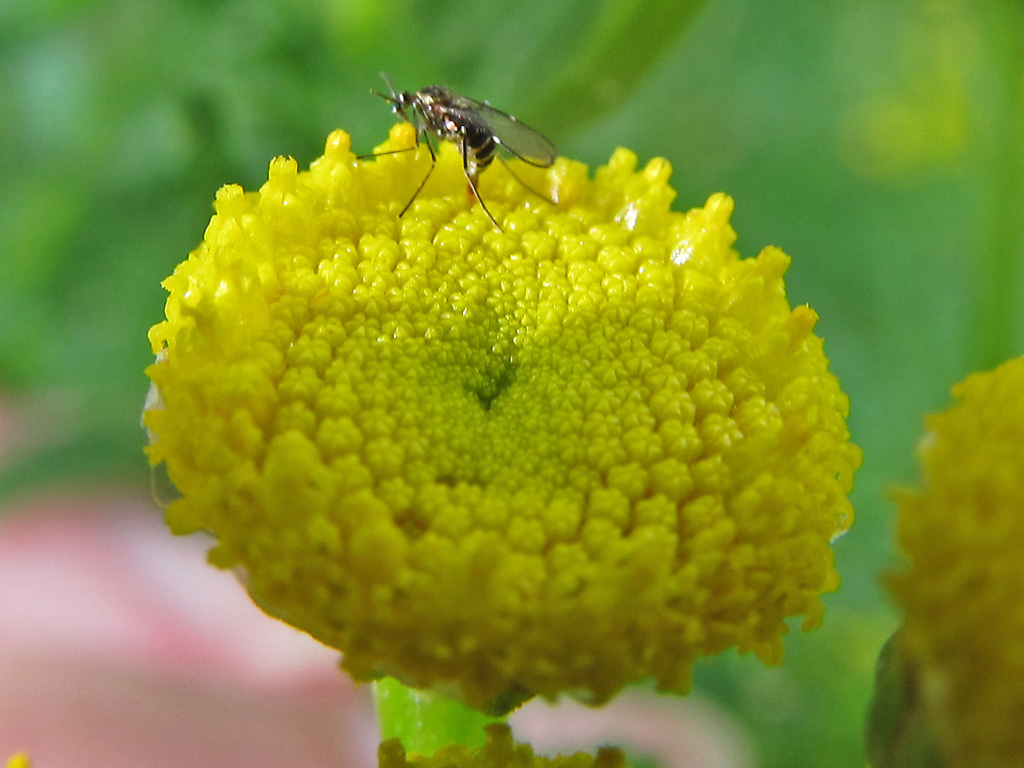
- Ovipositing female of Ozirhincus longicollis

Scientific classification
- Kingdom: Animalia
- Phylum: Arthropoda
- Class: Insecta
- Order: Diptera
- Family: Cecidomyiidae
- Subfamily: Cecidomyiinae
- Supertribe: Lasiopteridi
- Tribe: Lasiopterini
- Genus: Ozirhincus; Rondani, 1840

Type species
- Ozirhincus longicollis Rondani, 1840

Synonyms
- Acorhynchus Rondani, 1861; Clinorhyncha Loew, 1850; Oxyrhyncus Rondani, 1856; Ozyrhinchus Rondani, 1861; (and many spelling variations)

= Ozirhincus =

Genus of flies

Ozirhincus is a Palearctic genus of gall midges, whose larval stages feed predominantly on the seeds of Asteraceae.

== Bibliography ==
- Dorchin, Netta; Astrin, Jonas J.; Bodner, Levona; Harris, Keith M. (2015), "Morphological and Molecular Revision of the Genus Ozirhincus (Diptera: Cecidomyiidae)—Long-Snouted Seed-Feeding Gall Midges on Asteraceae", PLOS ONE, 10 (7) e0130981, Bibcode:2015PLoSO..1030981D, doi:10.1371/journal.pone.0130981, ISSN 1932-6203, PMC 4489628, PMID 26134526, S2CID 17568238
- Erwin Lindner (1966). Die Fliegen der Paläarktischen Region. E. Schweizerbart.
