= Astictoneura =

Scientific classification
- Kingdom: Animalia
- Phylum: Arthropoda
- Class: Insecta
- Order: Diptera
- Family: Cecidomyiidae
- Subfamily: Cecidomyiinae
- Tribe: Alycaulini
- Genus: Astictoneura; Gagne, 1969

Genus of flies

Astictoneura is a genus of gall midges in the family Cecidomyiidae. There are at least two described species in the genus.

== Species ==
These two species belong to the genus Astictoneura:

- Astictoneura agrostis (Osten Sacken, 1862)
- Astictoneura muhlenbergiae (Marten, 1893)
