= Bremia (fly) =

Scientific classification
- Domain: Eukaryota
- Kingdom: Animalia
- Phylum: Arthropoda
- Class: Insecta
- Order: Diptera
- Family: Cecidomyiidae
- Tribe: Cecidomyiini
- Genus: Bremia

Genus of flies

Bremia is a genus of gall midges (insects in the family Cecidomyiidae). There are at least 20 described species in Bremia.

== Species ==
These 21 species belong to the genus Bremia:

- Bremia actiosa Skuse, 1888^{g}
- Bremia agilis (Felt, 1920)^{c g}
- Bremia americana (Felt, 1914)^{i c g}
- Bremia bifurcata Kieffer, 1904^{c g}
- Bremia borealis Felt, 1914^{i c g}
- Bremia caricis (Felt, 1907)^{i c g}
- Bremia ciliata Kieffer, 1904^{c g}
- Bremia cilipes (Winnertz, 1853)^{c g}
- Bremia decorata (Loew, 1850)^{c g}
- Bremia filicis Felt, 1907^{i c g}
- Bremia fitchii (Felt, 1912)^{i c g}
- Bremia legrandi Harris, 1981^{c g}
- Bremia longicornis Kieffer, 1904^{c g}
- Bremia longipes (Kieffer, 1901)^{c g}
- Bremia macrofilum Felt, 1919^{c g}
- Bremia mirifica Gagne, 1994^{c g}
- Bremia montana Felt, 1914^{i c g}
- Bremia obconica Grover, 1979^{c g}
- Bremia podophyllae Felt, 1907^{i c g}
- Bremia sylvestris Felt, 1920^{i c g}
- Bremia tristis Felt, 1914^{i c g}

Data sources: i = ITIS, c = Catalogue of Life, g = GBIF, b = Bugguide.net
