= Anabremia =

Scientific classification
- Domain: Eukaryota
- Kingdom: Animalia
- Phylum: Arthropoda
- Class: Insecta
- Order: Diptera
- Family: Cecidomyiidae
- Subfamily: Cecidomyiinae
- Genus: Anabremia; Kieffer, 1912

Type species
- Anabremia bellevoyei

Species
- Anabremia bellevoyei; Anabremia inquilina; Anabremia massalongoi; Anabremia medicaginis; Anabremia trotteri; Anabremia viciae

Genus of gall midge

Anabremia is a genus of gall midge in the family Cecidomyiidae. The six described species are found in the Palearctic and likely inquilines of Dasineura galls on plants in the legume family. This genus was first described by Jean-Jacques Kieffer in 1912.
