= Pinyonia =

Scientific classification
- Domain: Eukaryota
- Kingdom: Animalia
- Phylum: Arthropoda
- Class: Insecta
- Order: Diptera
- Family: Cecidomyiidae
- Supertribe: Cecidomyiidi
- Genus: Pinyonia; Gagne, 1970
- Species: P. edulicola

Binomial name
- Pinyonia edulicola Gagne, 1970

Genus of flies

Pinyonia is a genus of gall midges, insects in the family Cecidomyiidae. There is at least one described species in Pinyonia, P. edulicola.
