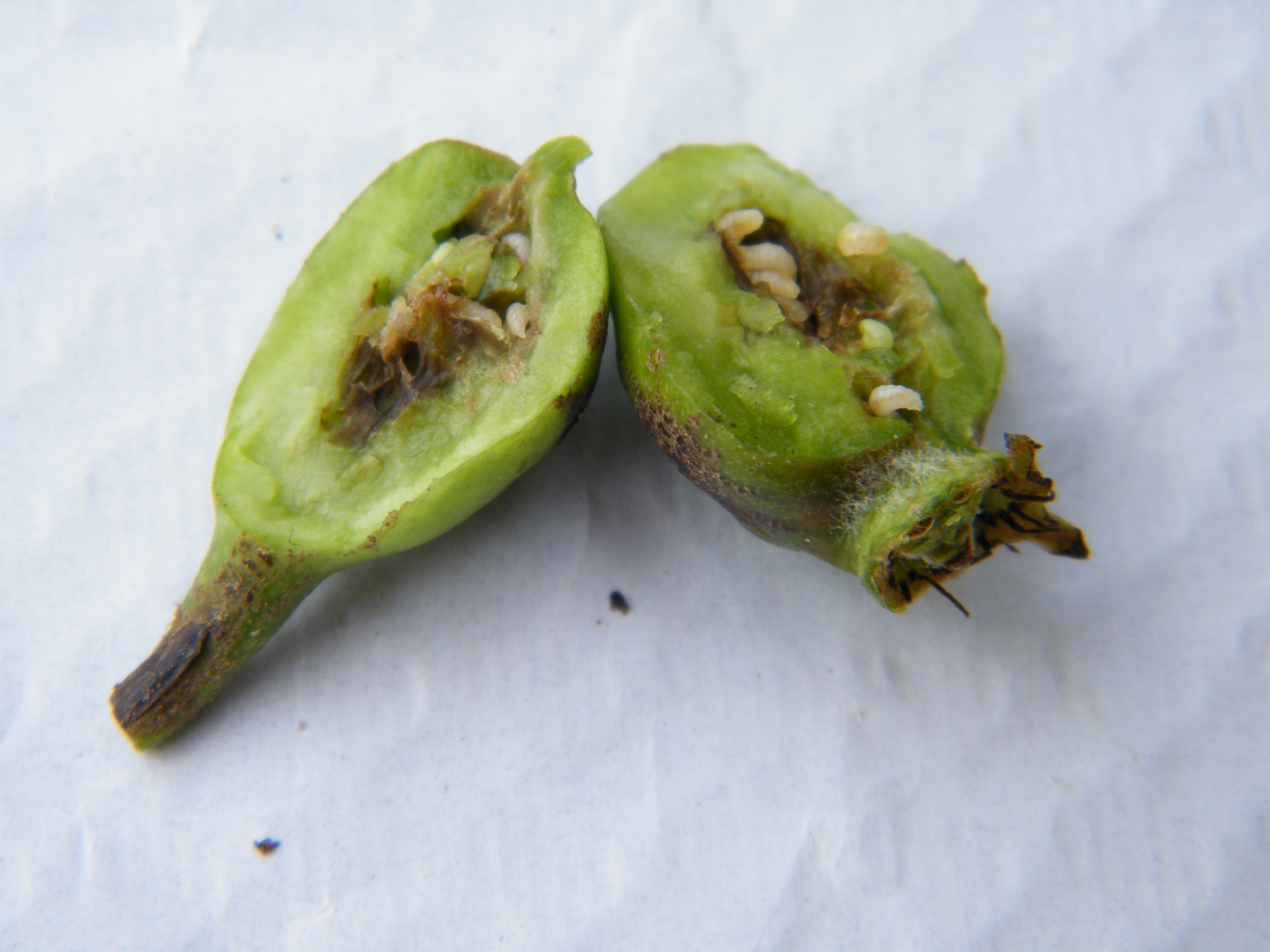

Scientific classification
- Kingdom: Animalia
- Phylum: Arthropoda
- Clade: Pancrustacea
- Class: Insecta
- Order: Diptera
- Family: Cecidomyiidae
- Subfamily: Cecidomyiinae
- Supertribe: Cecidomyiidi
- Tribe: Cecidomyiini
- Genus: Cecidomyia; Fischer von Waldheim Meigen, 1803

Species
- many, including: Cecidomyia elegans Winnertz, 1853; Cecidomyia ericoscopariae; Cecidomyia glutinosa; Cecidomyia lamellata; Cecidomyia pennicornis (Zetterstedt, 1850); Cecidomyia pini, type species

= Cecidomyia =

Genus of flies

Cecidomyia is a genus of gall midges in the tribe Cecidomyiini.
