= Pilodiplosis =

Scientific classification
- Domain: Eukaryota
- Kingdom: Animalia
- Phylum: Arthropoda
- Class: Insecta
- Order: Diptera
- Family: Cecidomyiidae
- Supertribe: Cecidomyiidi
- Genus: Pilodiplosis; Gagne, 1973
- Species: P. helianthibulla

Binomial name
- Pilodiplosis helianthibulla (Walsh, 1866)

Genus of flies

Pilodiplosis is a genus of gall midges, insects in the family Cecidomyiidae. There is at least one described species in Pilodiplosis, P. helianthibulla.
