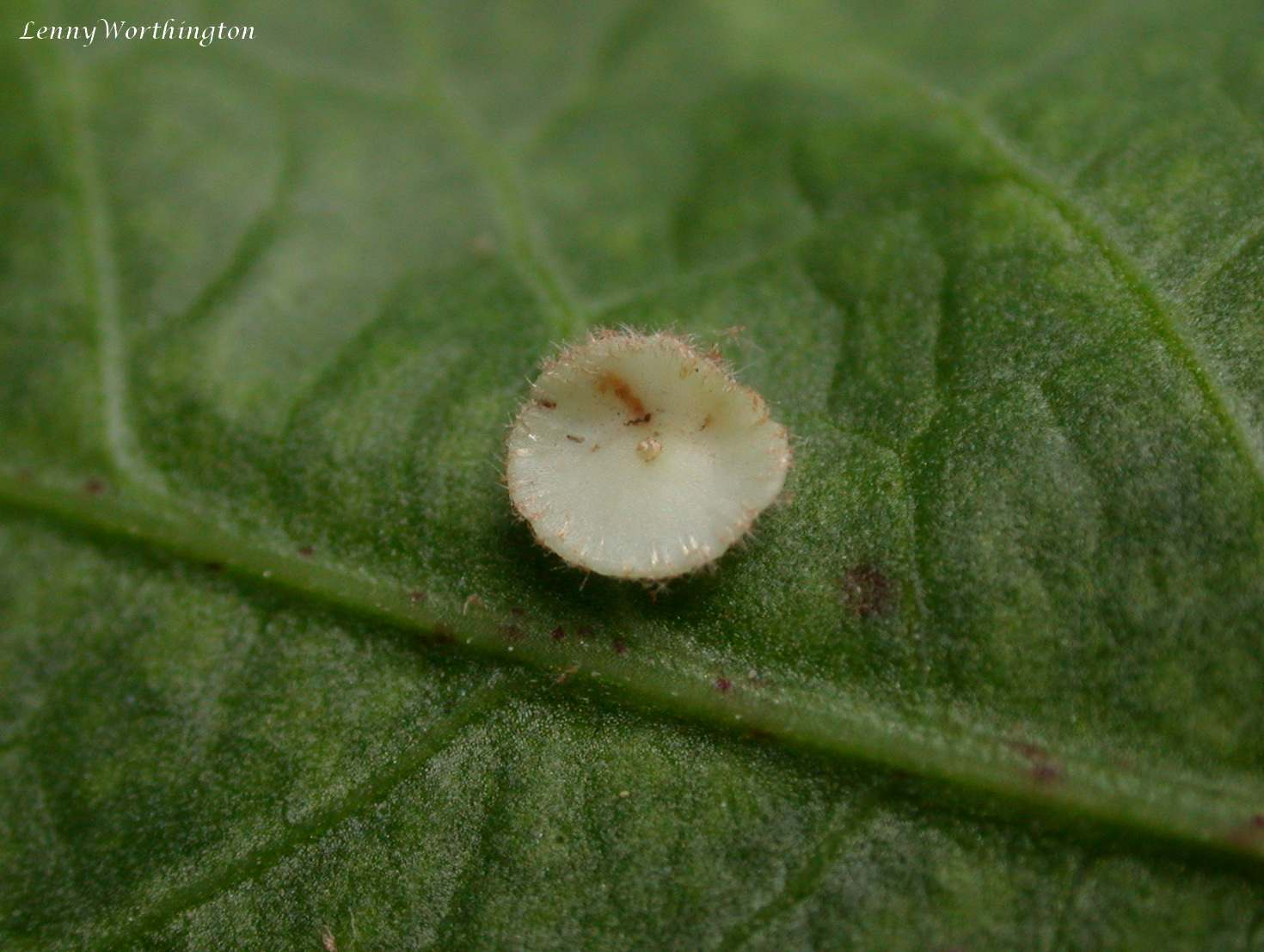
- Parallelodiplosis galliperda on Spangle Gall Neurotus quercusbaccarum

Scientific classification
- Kingdom: Animalia
- Phylum: Arthropoda
- Class: Insecta
- Order: Diptera
- Family: Cecidomyiidae
- Subfamily: Cecidomyiinae
- Supertribe: Cecidomyiidi
- Genus: Parallelodiplosis; Rübsaamen, 1910

= Parallelodiplosis =

Genus of flies

Parallelodiplosis is a genus of gall midges, insects in the family Cecidomyiidae. There are at least 20 described species in Parallelodiplosis.

== Species ==
These 23 species belong to the genus Parallelodiplosis:

- Parallelodiplosis abdominalis (Felt, 1921)^{i c g}
- Parallelodiplosis acernea (Felt, 1907)^{i c g}
- Parallelodiplosis aprilis (Felt, 1912)^{i c g}
- Parallelodiplosis autumnalis Grover & Madhu Bakhshi, 1978^{c g}
- Parallelodiplosis bimaculata Hardy, 1960^{i c g}
- Parallelodiplosis bupleuri (Rübsaamen, 1895)^{c g}
- Parallelodiplosis carpinicola (Kieffer, 1913)^{i c g}
- Parallelodiplosis caryae (Felt, 1907)^{i c g}
- Parallelodiplosis cattleyae (Molliard)^{i c g}
- Parallelodiplosis florida (Felt, 1908)^{i c g}
- Parallelodiplosis galliperda (Low, 1889)^{c g}
- Parallelodiplosis hartmaniae (Felt, 1921)^{i c g}
- Parallelodiplosis indorensis Grover, 1979^{c g}
- Parallelodiplosis montana (Felt, 1908)^{i c g}
- Parallelodiplosis nixoni (Felt, 1908)^{i c g}
- Parallelodiplosis ramuli (Felt, 1907)^{i c g}
- Parallelodiplosis rotunda Chandra, 1993^{c g}
- Parallelodiplosis rubrascuta (Felt, 1907)^{i c g}
- Parallelodiplosis sarae Gagne, 1972^{i c g}
- Parallelodiplosis spirae (Felt, 1909)^{i c g}
- Parallelodiplosis subtruncata (Felt, 1907)^{i c g b}
- Parallelodiplosis tolhurstae (Felt, 1908)^{i c g}
- Parallelodiplosis triangularis Grover & Kashyap, 1991^{c g}

Data sources: i = ITIS, c = Catalogue of Life, g = GBIF, b = Bugguide.net
