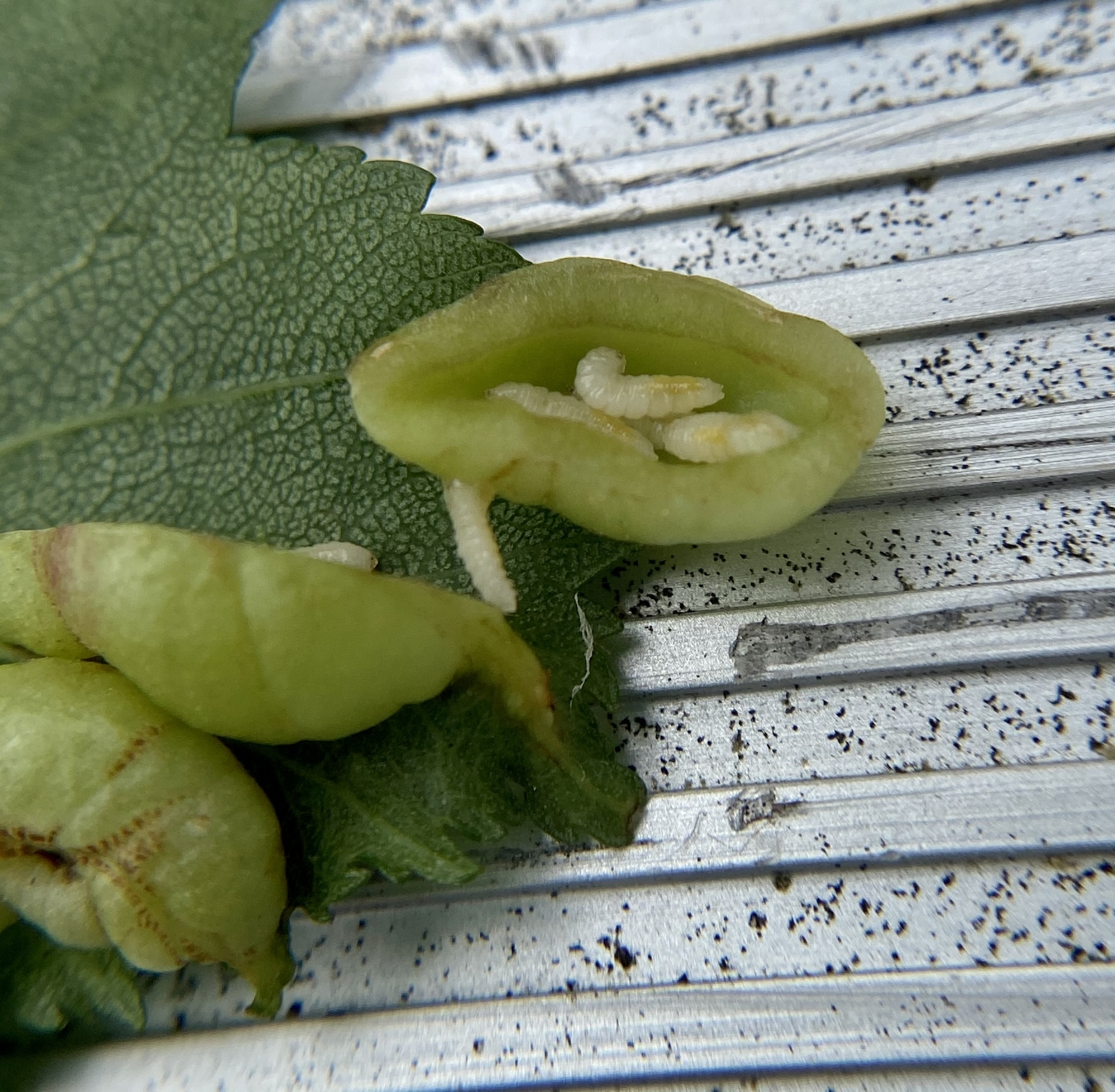
- Blaesodiplosis venae larvae and leaf galls

Scientific classification
- Domain: Eukaryota
- Kingdom: Animalia
- Phylum: Arthropoda
- Class: Insecta
- Order: Diptera
- Family: Cecidomyiidae
- Subfamily: Cecidomyiinae
- Supertribe: Cecidomyiidi
- Genus: Blaesodiplosis; Gagne, 1973

= Blaesodiplosis =

Genus of flies

Blaesodiplosis is a genus of gall midges in the family Cecidomyiidae. There are at least four described species in Blaesodiplosis.

== Species ==
These four species belong to the genus Blaesodiplosis:

- Blaesodiplosis canadensis (Felt, 1908)^{i c g}
- Blaesodiplosis crataegibedeguar (Osten Sacken, 1878)^{c g}
- Blaesodiplosis crataegifolia (Felt, 1907)^{i c g b}
- Blaesodiplosis venae (Stebbins, 1910)^{i c g}

Data sources: i = ITIS, c = Catalogue of Life, g = GBIF, b = Bugguide.net
