= Procontarinia matteiana =

Scientific classification
- Kingdom: Animalia
- Phylum: Arthropoda
- Class: Insecta
- Order: Diptera
- Family: Cecidomyiidae
- Genus: Procontarinia
- Species: P. matteiana

Binomial name
- Procontarinia matteiana Kieffer & Cecconi, 1906

Species of fly

Procontarinia matteiana, (also known as mango gall fly and leaf-gall midge, is a species of midges in the genus Procontarinia of the family Cecidomyiidae that can be found in India, Kenya, Mauritius, and Réunion.

== Description ==
The species are 1.5 millimetres (0.059 in) long, with the males being slightly smaller. Both sexes have different antennae size, with males having the longest. Another way to tell a difference between the sexes is by looking at their abdomen. The males have distal claspers on its abdomen. They mate in mid air. The males feed on mango trees early morning.
