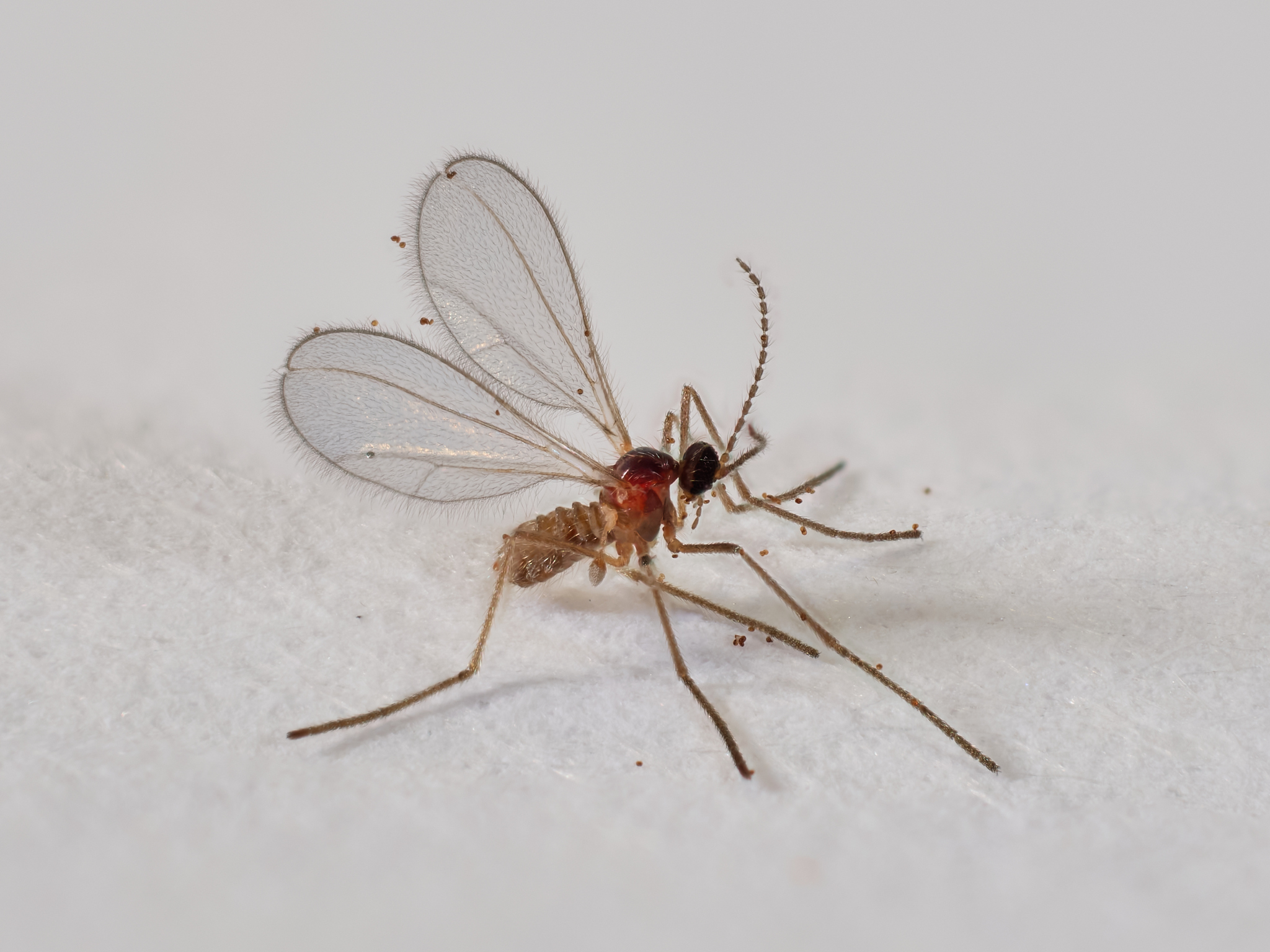
- Adult Mycodiplosis reared from a larva on Puccinia hypochaeridis

Scientific classification
- Domain: Eukaryota
- Kingdom: Animalia
- Phylum: Arthropoda
- Class: Insecta
- Order: Diptera
- Family: Cecidomyiidae
- Subfamily: Cecidomyiinae
- Supertribe: Cecidomyiidi
- Tribe: Mycodiplosini
- Genus: Mycodiplosis; Rübsaamen, 1895

Synonyms
- Isodiplosis Rübsaamen, 1912

= Mycodiplosis =

Genus of flies

Mycodiplosis is a genus of gall midges. The larvae feed on the spores of rust fungi, powdery mildews, downy mildews, Polythrincium trifolii, and Rhytisma acerinum. It is thought that they are generalist, without strong preferences for individual species of rust; there is only limited evidence to suggest some degree of host specificity.

== Taxonomy ==
Mycodiplosis contains the following species:

- Mycodiplosis pucciniae
- Mycodiplosis thoracica
- Mycodiplosis fraxinicola
- Mycodiplosis sphaerothecae
- Mycodiplosis coniophaga
- Mycodiplosis erysiphes
- Mycodiplosis heterosaetosa
- Mycodiplosis gymnosporangii
- Mycodiplosis constricta
- Mycodiplosis hemileiae
- Mycodiplosis glycyrrhizae
