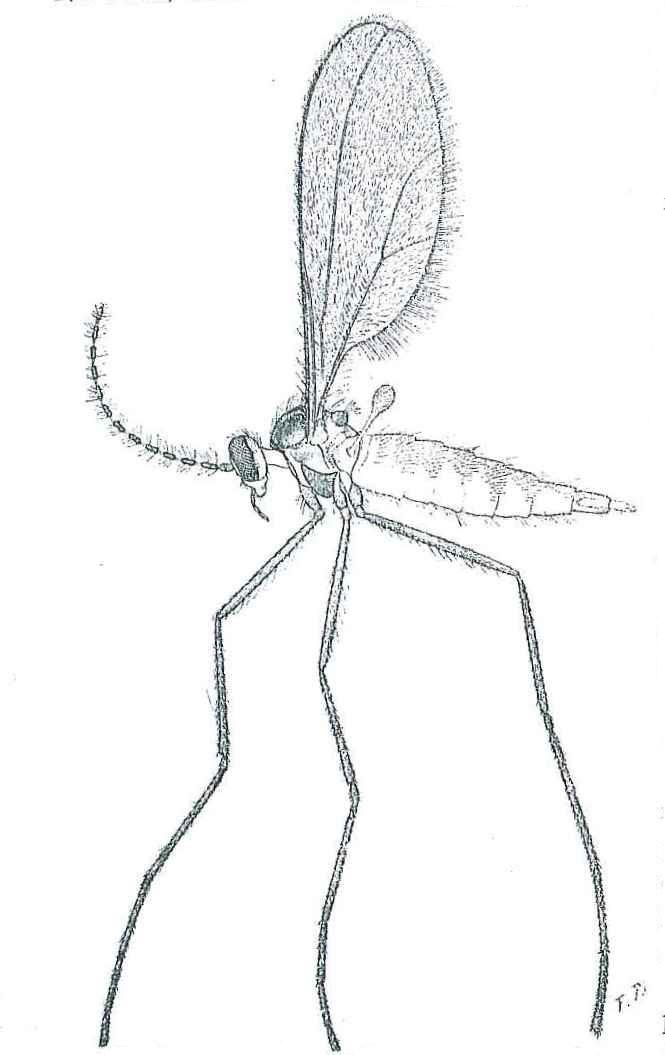
- Sitodiplosis mosellana

Scientific classification
- Domain: Eukaryota
- Kingdom: Animalia
- Phylum: Arthropoda
- Class: Insecta
- Order: Diptera
- Family: Cecidomyiidae
- Genus: Sitodiplosis; Kieffer, 1913

= Sitodiplosis =

Genus of flies

Sitodiplosis is a genus of flies belonging to the family Cecidomyiidae.

The species of this genus are found in Europe, Eastern Asia, Northern America.

Species:

- Sitodiplosis cambriensis Jones, 1940
- Sitodiplosis dactylidis Barnes, 1940
- Sitodiplosis latiaedeagis Liu & Mo, 2001
- Sitodiplosis mosellana (Gehin, 1857)
- Sitodiplosis phalaridis Abbass, 1986
- Sitodiplosis subhashensis Grover & Madhu Bakhshi, 1978
