= Massalongia (fly) =

Scientific classification
- Kingdom: Animalia
- Phylum: Arthropoda
- Clade: Pancrustacea
- Class: Insecta
- Order: Diptera
- Family: Cecidomyiidae
- Subfamily: Cecidomyiinae
- Genus: Massalongia; Kieffer, 1890

Genus of fly

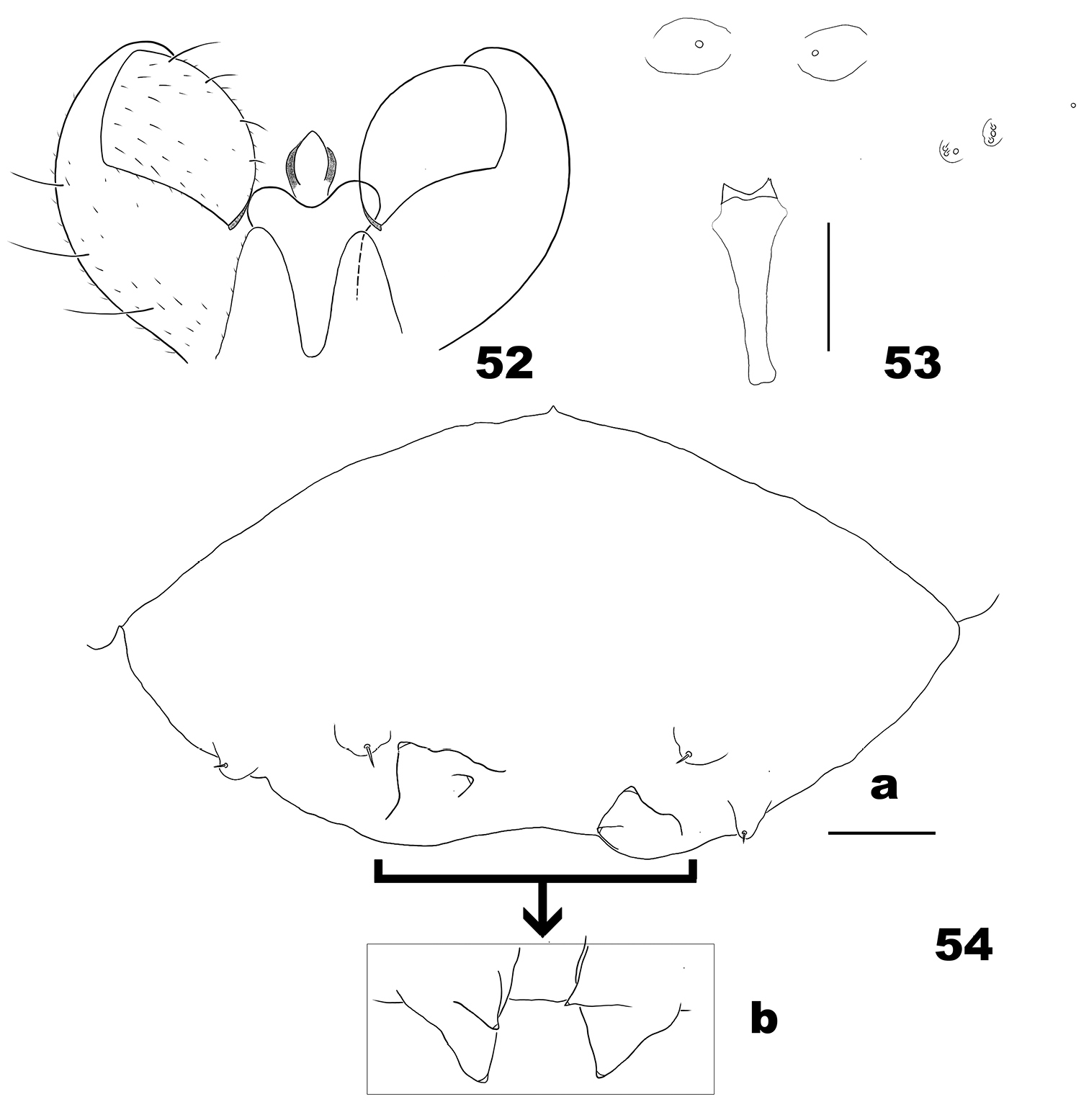
Figures 52–54; Massalongia rubra

Massalongia is a genus of flies in the family Cecidomyiidae. The larvae induce galls on birches.

In 1855, the genus was named after Italian lichenologist Abramo Bartolommeo Massalongo by German lichenologist Gustav Wilhelm Körber.

== Species ==
The following six species have been described in this genus:

- Massalongia altaica Fedotova, 1990
- Massalongia bachmaieri Möhn, 1954
- Massalongia betulifolia Harris, 1974
- Massalongia nakamuratetsui Elsayed & Tokuda 2020
- Massalongia papyrifera (Gagné, 1967)
- Massalongia rubra (Kieffer, 1890)
