= Monarthropalpus =

Scientific classification
- Domain: Eukaryota
- Kingdom: Animalia
- Phylum: Arthropoda
- Class: Insecta
- Order: Diptera
- Family: Cecidomyiidae
- Supertribe: Cecidomyiidi
- Genus: Monarthropalpus; Rübsaamen, 1892

Genus of flies

Monarthropalpus is a genus of gall midges in the family Cecidomyiidae. There is at least one described species in Monarthropalpus, M. flavus.
