= Zeuxidiplosis =

Scientific classification
- Kingdom: Animalia
- Phylum: Arthropoda
- Clade: Pancrustacea
- Class: Insecta
- Order: Diptera
- Family: Cecidomyiidae
- Subfamily: Cecidomyiinae
- Genus: Zeuxidiplosis; Kieffer

Genus of fly

Zeuxidiplosis is a genus of gall-forming midge. The genus includes the species Zeuxidiplosis giardi which feeds on Hypericum and has been introduced into some countries as a biological control agent for St. Johns wort (Hypericum perforatum).
