= Ephraim Porter Felt =

American entomologist

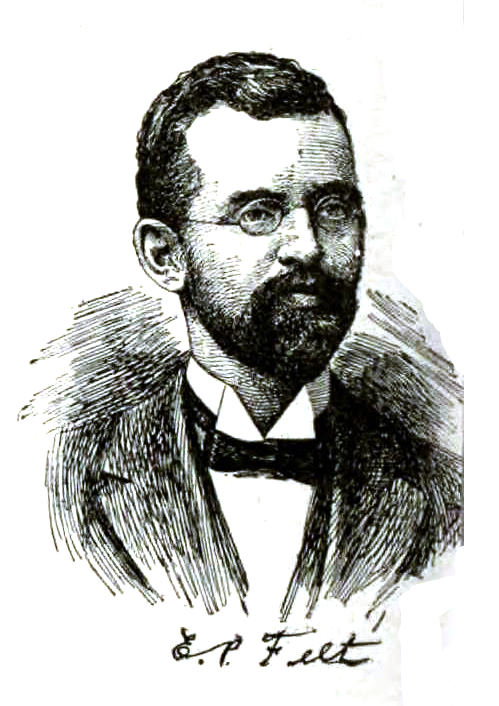
- Born: January 7, 1868; Salem, Massachusetts
- Died: December 14, 1943 (aged 75); Stamford, Connecticut
- Education: Massachusetts Agricultural College; Boston University; Cornell
- Occupation: Entomologist
- Spouse: Helen Maria Otterson (m. 1896)
- Children: 2

Ephraim Porter Felt (January 7, 1868 – December 14, 1943) was an American entomologist who specialised in Diptera.

== Biography ==
Ephraim Porter Felt was born in Salem, Massachusetts on January 7, 1868, to Charles Wilson Felt and Martha Seeth Ropes Felt. He was educated at Massachusetts Agricultural College, Boston University, and Cornell. From 1893 to 1895, Felt taught natural sciences at Clinton Liberal Institute. In 1895, he was appointed assistant to J.A. Lintner, the State Entomologist of New York. Following Lintner's death in 1898, Felt was appointed as State Entomologist and remained in that position until his retirement in 1928. In retirement he worked at Bartlett Tree Research Laboratories in Stamford, Connecticut, where he died from a heart attack on December 14, 1943.

He married Helen Maria Otterson on June 24, 1896, and they had two children.

Felt worked mostly with Nematocera, particularly Cecidomyiidae. However, as State Entomologist for New York, the scope of his work included all insects of economic or medical significance. He wrote Insects Affecting Park and Woodland Trees (New York State Museum Memoir 8, 1905–1906), Control of Household Insects (New York State Museum Bulletin No. 129, May 1906), and Plant Galls and Gall Makers (Ithaca, N.Y., Comstock Pub. Co., 1940), and described over 1,000 species in scientific journals. He described the mosquito genus Culiseta. The holotypes of the Felt-named insect species are in the National Museum of Natural History.
