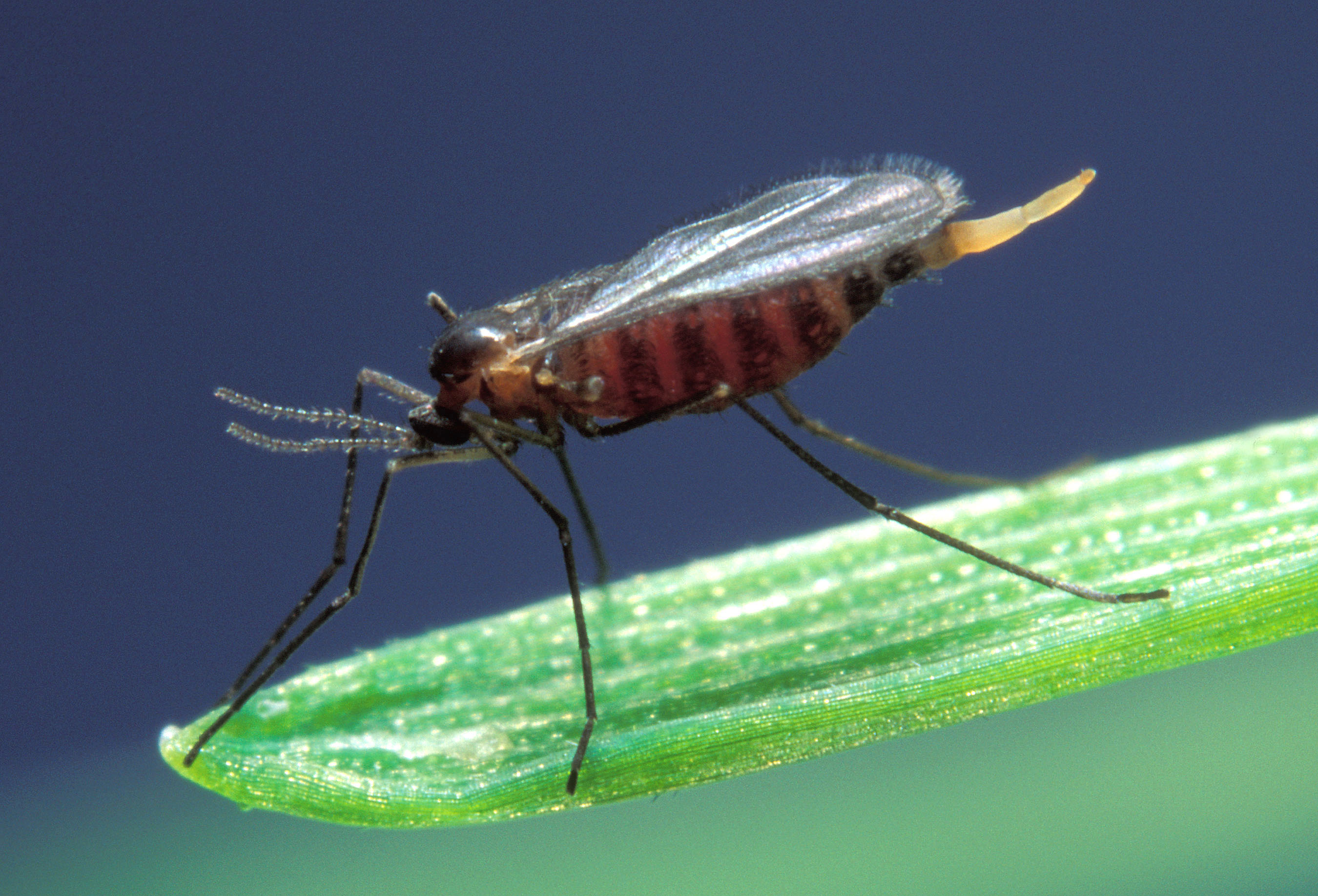
- The Hessian fly (Mayetiola destructor) from the subfamily Cecidomyiinae

Scientific classification
- Kingdom: Animalia
- Phylum: Arthropoda
- Clade: Pancrustacea
- Class: Insecta
- Order: Diptera
- Family: Cecidomyiidae
- Subfamily: Cecidomyiinae

Supertribes
- Asphondyliidi; Brachineuridi; Cecidomyiidi; Lasiopteridi; Stomatosematidi

= Cecidomyiinae =

Subfamily of flies

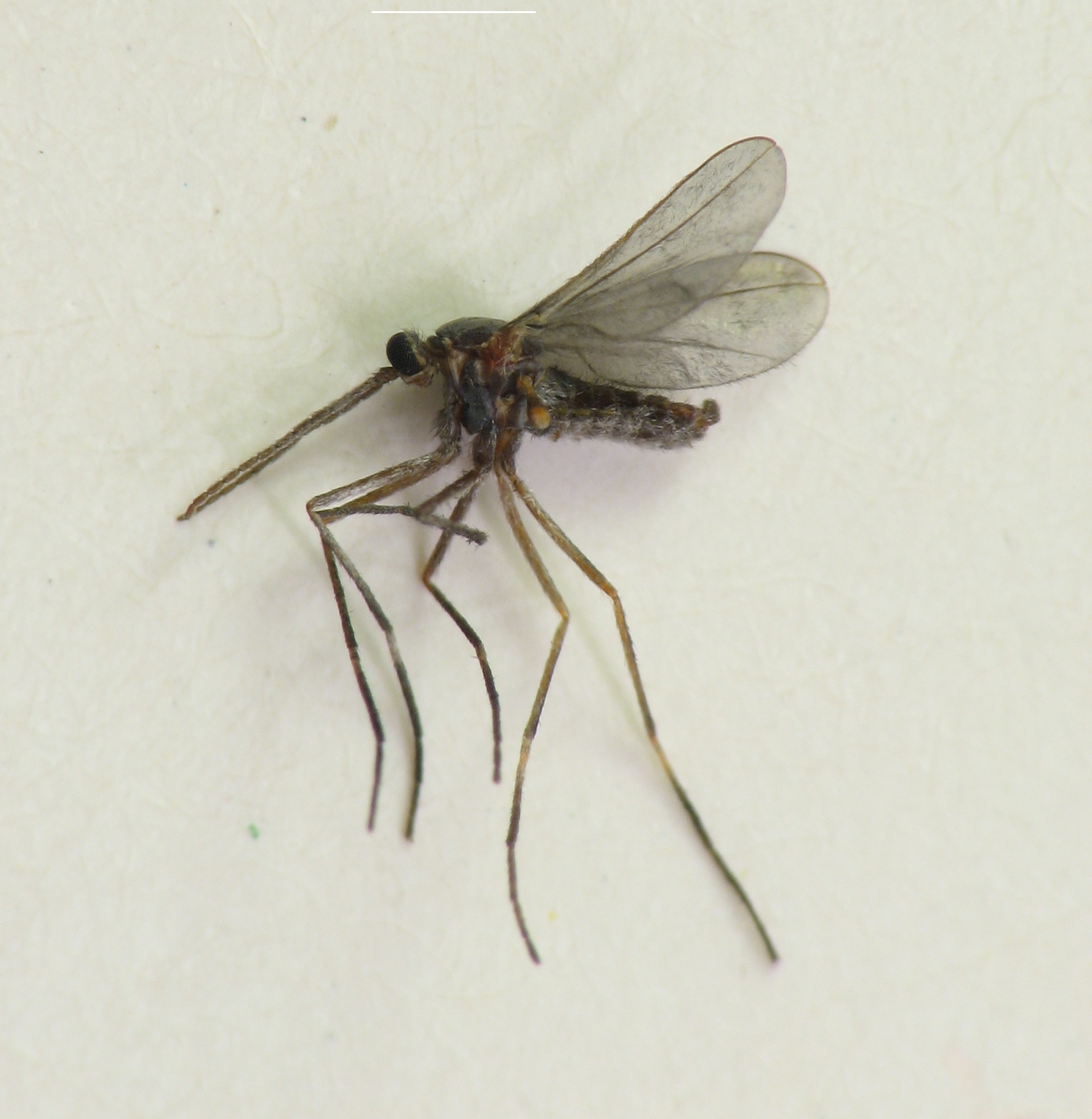
Asphondylia solidaginis

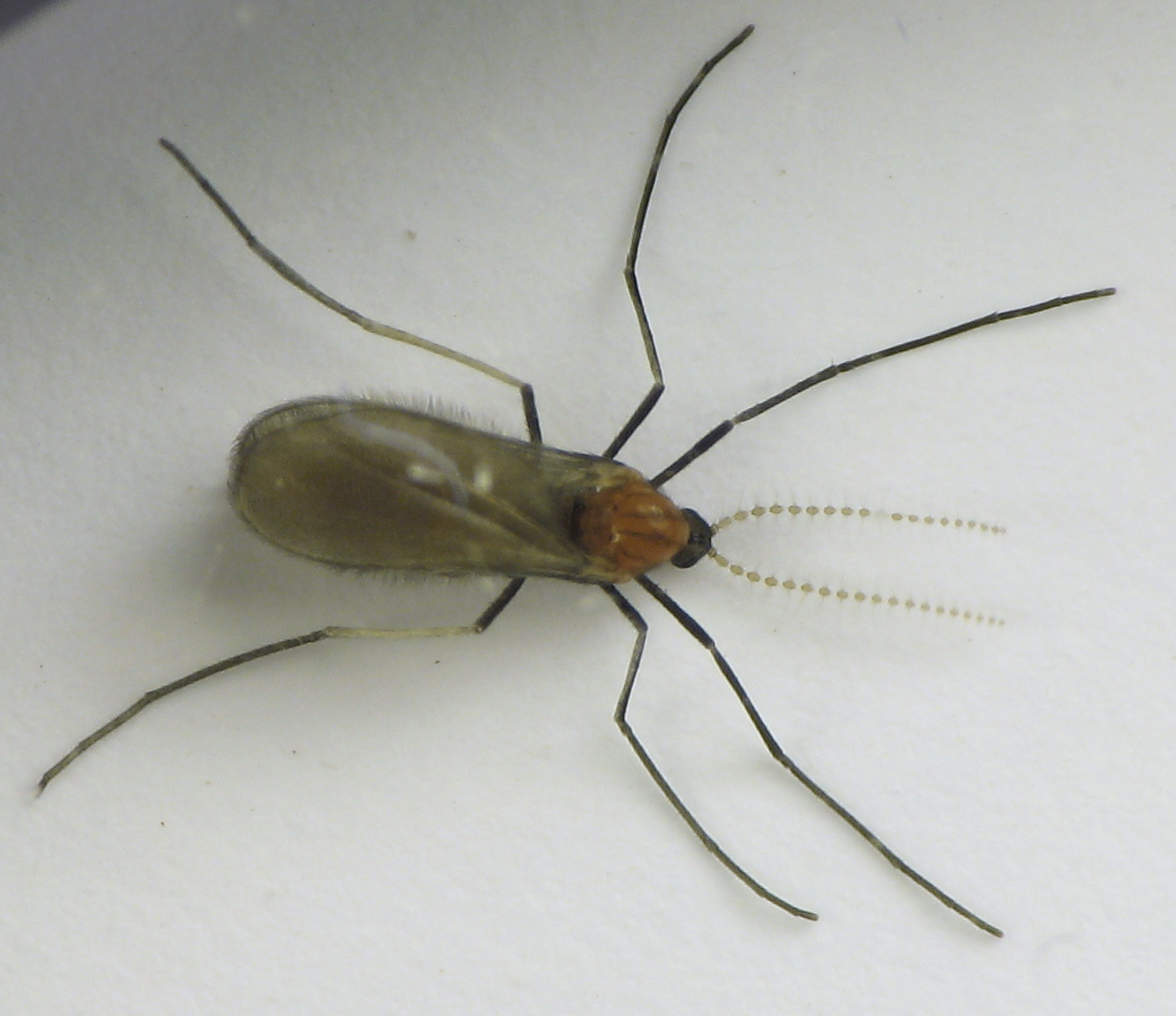
Rhopalomyia solidaginis

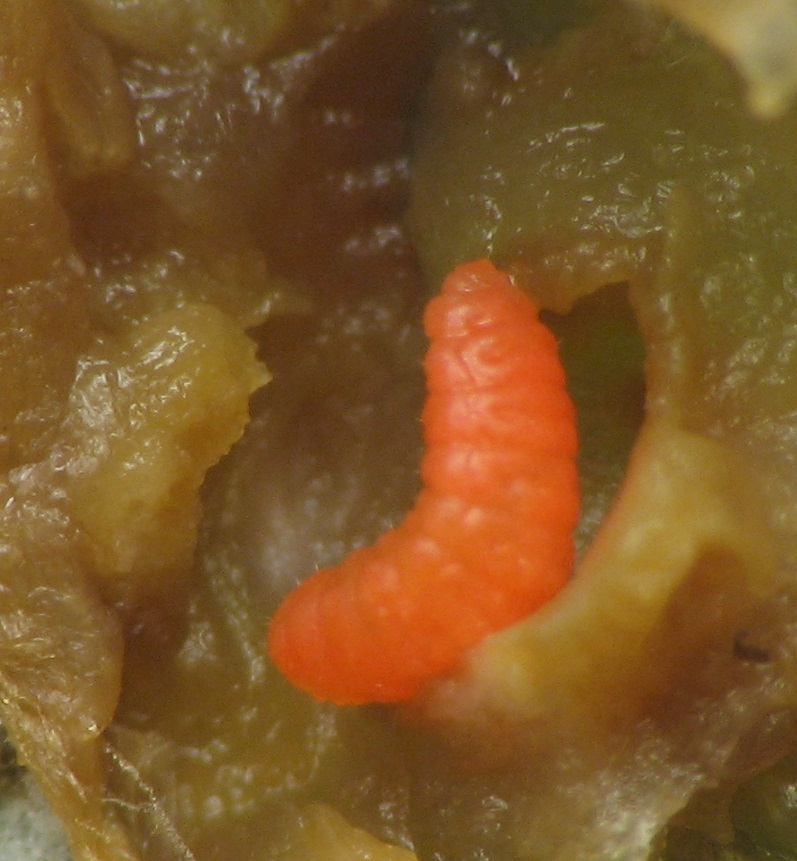
Vitisiella larva

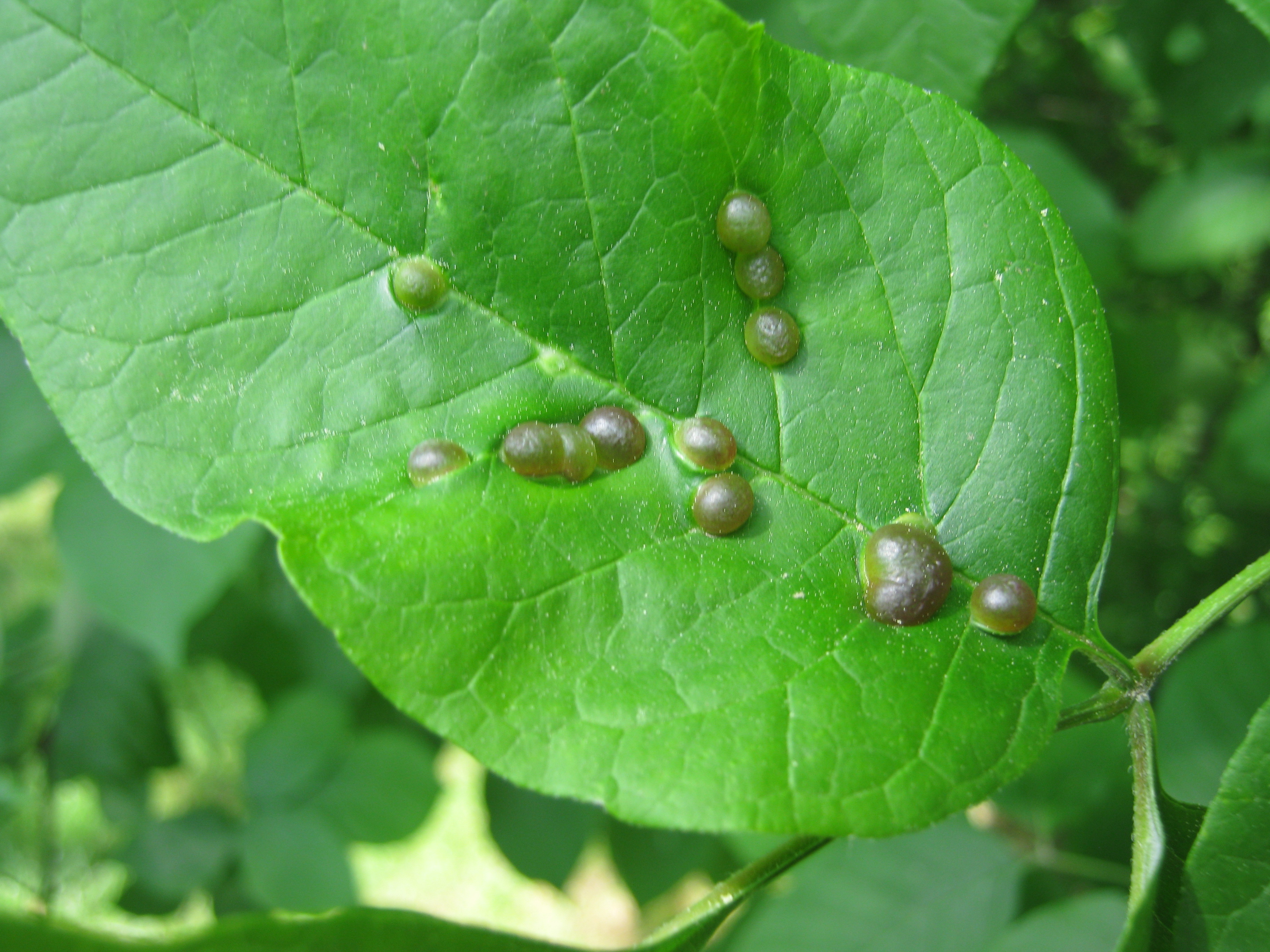
Galls of Dasineura pellex on leaf of ash tree (Fraxinus)

The Cecidomyiinae, commonly known as gall midges or gall gnats, is the largest subfamily in Cecidomyiidae with over 600 genera and more than 5000 described species. Larvae of the other (basal) cecidomyiid subfamilies feed on fungi; whereas this subfamily is best known for its members that induce galls on plants. However, there are also many species of Cecidomyiinae that are fungivores, parasitoids, or predators as maggots.

Herbivorous species make up about 75% of the Cecidomyiinae; many are gall-inducers, infecting a wide diversity of plants. They are found world-wide and are the most ecologically diverse gall-inducing group of organisms. Most develop in one or a few closely related host-plant species. In three tribes (Asphondyliini, Alycaulini and Lasiopterini) the midges are associated with specific fungi; these have been termed 'ambrosia gallers' because the fungi line the inner walls of the galls, in a similar way to those in the galleries of ambrosia beetles. Some of the herbivorous species are inquilines, developing in galls that were initiated by a different midge species. Most species in the genus Macrolabis and the tribes Trotteriini and Camptoneuromyiini are inquilines, but there are also many inquiline species in genera that are predominantly gall-inducing (such as Dasineura and Lasioptera).

Predatory and parasitoid species comprise about 12% of the Cecidomyiinae. Larvae of these species attack other arthropods - there are known predators of mites, aphids, scale insects, dragonfly eggs, and endoparasitoids of Hemiptera. Most are found in the tribes Aphidoletini and Lestodiplosini.

Fungivores make up much of the remainder of the subfamily, indicating the retention of (or reversion to) the ancestral food source.

== Systematics ==
Cecidomyiinae is monophyletic and species of the subfamily can be distinguished from other Cecidomyiidae by characters of the male genitalia, the number of antennal segments, and bristles on the larval abdomen.

The Cecidomyiinae are divided into five supertribes, which contain the following tribes, and selected genera:

=== Asphondyliidi ===
- Tribe Asphondyliini
  - Asphondylia Loew, 1850
- Tribe Kiefferiini
  - Kiefferia Mik, 1895
- Tribe Polystephini
  - Polystepha Kieffer, 1897
- Tribe Schizomyiini
  - Placochela Rübsaamen, 1916
  - Schizomyia Kieffer, 1889

=== Brachineuridi ===
- tribe Brachineurini
1. Acinacistyla Fedotova & Sidorenko, 2006
2. Alatostyla Fedotova & Sidorenko, 2006
3. Brachineura Rondani, 1840
4. Loborrhizomyia Jiao, Wang & Bu, 2019
- tribe Rhizomyiini - monotypic
1. Rhizomyia Kieffer, 1898
- incertae sedis
1. Brachyneurina Mamaev, 1967
2. Chrybaneura Gagné, 1968
3. Cingola Fedotova & Sidorenko, 2006
4. Coccidomyia Felt, 1911
5. Compositola Fedotova & Sidorenko, 2006
6. Effusomyia Fedotova, 2004
7. Epimyia Felt, 1911
8. Epimyiella Mamaev, 1967
9. Nodalistyla Fedotova & Sidorenko, 2006
10. Stabiliola Fedotova & Sidorenko, 2006
11. Undoneura Fedotova & Sidorenko, 2006
12. Volsatiola Fedotova & Sidorenko, 2006

=== Cecidomyiidi ===
- Tribe Anadiplosini
- Tribe Aphidoletini
- Tribe Cecidomyiini
1. Acacidiplosis Gagné in Gagné & Marohasy, 1993
2. Acerovesiculomyia Fedotova, 2003
3. Anisostephus Rübsaamen, 1917
4. Austroacacidiplosis Kolesik, 2012
5. Caryadiplosis Gagné, 2008
6. Caryomyia Felt, 1909
7. Cecidomyia Meigen, 1803
8. Cerciplanus Garcia & Urso-Guimarães, 2020
9. Chamaediplosis Gagne & Duncan, 1990
10. Contarinia Rondani, 1860
11. Efferatodiplosis Fedotova, 2006
12. Garugadiplosis Deshpande, Shaikh & Sharma, 2002
13. Gobidiplosis Mamaev, 1972
14. Halodiplosis Kieffer, 1912
15. Lobopteromyia Felt, 1908
16. Macrodiplosis Kieffer, 1895
17. Paradiplosis Felt, 1908
18. Parkiamyia Maia, 2006
19. Phyllodiplosis Kieffer, 1912
20. Pinyonia Gagné, 1970
21. Plemeliella Seitner, 1908
22. Procontarinia Kieffer & Cecconi, 1906
23. Prodiplosis Felt, 1908
24. Psephodiplosis Kolesik, 2018
25. Sequoiomyia Möhn, 1960
26. Sphaerodiplosis Rübsaamen, 1916
27. Stenodiplosis Reuter, 1895
28. Taxodiomyia Gagné, 1968
29. Thecodiplosis Kieffer, 1895
30. Zeuxidiplosis Kieffer, 1904
- Tribe Centrodiplosini
1. Centrodiplosis Kieffer, 1910
2. Cystodiplosis Kieffer & Jörgensen, 1910
3. Jorgensenia Kieffer, 1913
- Tribe Clinodiplosini - selected genera
  - Clinodiplosis Kieffer, 1894
  - Schismatodiplosis Rübsaamen, 1916
- Tribe Hormomyiini - monotypic
1. Planetella Westwood, 1840
- Tribe Karshomyiini
- Tribe Lestodiplosini
- Tribe Lopesiini
- Tribe Mycodiplosini
- Cecidomyiidi incertae sedis
1. Acanthacidiplosis Fedotova, 2003
2. Acodiplosis Kieffer, 1895
3. Aculeatodiplosis Fedotova & Sidorenko, 2005
4. Afrodiplosis Felt, 1926
5. Ampelosucta Stefani, 1912
6. Anabremia Kieffer, 1912
7. Anasphodiplosis Gagné, 1994
8. Andirodiplosis Tavares, 1920
9. Anisodiplosis Maia, 2005
10. Antichiridium Rübsaamen, 1911
11. Apagodiplosis Gagne, 1973
12. Aplecus Kieffer, 1913
13. Apodiplosis Tavares, 1922
14. Arrabiadaeamyia Maia, 2001
15. Aschistonyx Rübsaamen, 1917
16. Asphotrophia Barnes, 1928
17. Astrodiplosis Felt, 1913
18. Athidiplosis Gagné & Marohasy, 1993
19. Atopodiplosis Gagne, 1997
20. Atrichosema Kieffer, 1904
21. Austrodiplosis Brèthes, 1915
22. Baeodiplosis Kieffer, 1913
23. Bicornidiplosis Fedotova, 2003
24. Blaesodiplosis Gagne, 1973
25. Blastodiplosis Kieffer, 1912
26. Brachydiplosis Rübsaamen, 1910
27. Braueriella Kieffer, 1896
28. Brephometra Strand, 1910
29. Buhriella Stelter, 1960
30. Bungomyia Nayar, 1949
31. Cacoplecus Kieffer, 1913
32. Callitridiplosis Kolesík, 2000
33. Calodiplosis Tavares, 1908
34. Calyptradiplosis Fedotova in Fedotova & Sidorenko, 2004
35. Carinatidiplosis Fedotova, 2004
36. Chaetodiplosis Kieffer, 1913
37. Chrysodiplosis Kieffer, 1911
38. Cleitodiplosis Tavares, 1916
39. Clusiamyia Maia, 1997
40. Coccomyza Del Guercio, 1918
41. Coelodiplosis Kieffer, 1913
42. Collula Strand, 1928
43. Compsodiplosis Tavares, 1909
44. Conodiplosis Kieffer, 1913
45. Contodiplosis Gagné, 1994
46. Cordylodiplosis Gagné, 1973
47. Ctenodactylomyia Felt, 1915
48. Ctenodiplosis Kieffer, 1913
49. Dactylodiplosis Rübsaamen, 1916
50. Delodiplosis Tavares, 1908
51. Diadiplosis Felt, 1911
52. Dichaetia Mamaev, 1965
53. Dichodiplosis Rübsaamen, 1910
54. Dicrodiplosis Kieffer, 1895
55. Diodaulus Rübsaamen, 1917
56. Diplodontomyia Rao, 1951
57. Diplosiola Solinas, 1965
58. Dissimilidiplosis Fedotova, 2005
59. Drisina Giard, 1893
60. Echinella Mamaev, 1965
61. Enallodiplosis Gagné, 1994
62. Eohormomyia Felt, 1915
63. Epihormomyia Felt, 1915
64. Etsuhoa Inouye, 1959
65. Eucalyptodiplosis Kolesik, 2002
66. Eumerosema Kieffer, 1913
67. Exiguidiplosis Fedotova, 2004
68. Filidiplosis Fedotova, 2003
69. Flexipidiplosis Fedotova & Sidorenko, 2009
70. Frauenfeldiella Rübsaamen, 1905
71. Geromyia Coutin & Harris, 1969
72. Giardomyia Felt, 1908
73. Gigantodiplosis Fedotova, 2004
74. Gladiodiplosis Kolesik, 2000
75. Glenodiplosis Gagné, 1973
76. Gnesiodiplosis Tavares, 1917
77. Gongrodiplosis Gagné, 1973
78. Gynandrobremia Mamaev, 1965
79. Gynodiplosis Felt, 1927
80. Haplodiplosis Rübsaamen, 1910
81. Harmandiola Skuhravá, 1997
82. Heliodiplosis Felt, 1918
83. Holobremia Kieffer, 1912
84. Holodiplosis Kieffer, 1913
85. Horidiplosis Felt, 1920
86. Huradiplosis Nijveldt, 1968
87. Hygrodiplosis Kieffer, 1912
88. Hypodiplosis Kieffer, 1913
89. Inulomyia Stelter, 1965
90. Kamptodiplosis Felt, 1918
91. Kimadiplosis Gagné, 1993
92. Kitella Deshpande, Shaikh & Sharma, 2005
93. Kronodiplosis Felt, 1918
94. Lasiodiplosis Kieffer, 1913
95. Lepidobremia Kieffer, 1912
96. Lepidodiplosis Kieffer, 1911
97. Lianodiplosis Fedotova & Sidorenko, 2006
98. Liebeliola Kieffer & Jörgensen, 1910
99. Ligulodiplosis Fedotova, 2006
100. Loewiola Kieffer, 1896
101. Lophodiplosis Gagné, 1997
102. Magadiplosis Fedotova & Sidorenko, 2009
103. Mamaevia Skuhravá, 1967
104. Manilkaramyia Maia, 2001
105. Marikovskidiplosis Fedotova & Sidorenko, 2009
106. Massalongia Kieffer, 1897
107. Megaulus Rübsaamen, 1916
108. Megommata Barnes, 1939
109. Mesodiplosis Kolesik, 2000
110. Meterdiplosis Barnes, 1927
111. Microdiplosis Tavares, 1908
112. Microplecus Kieffer, 1913
113. Mikaniadiplosis Gagné, 2001
114. Mitodiplosis Kieffer, 1914
115. Moehniella Wünsch, 1979
116. Monarthropalpus Rübsaamen, 1892
117. Monodiplosis Rübsaamen, 1910
118. Mycetodiplosis Kieffer, 1912
119. Mycocecis Edwards, 1922
120. Myricomyia Kieffer, 1900
121. Nanodiplosis Kieffer, 1913
122. Neobaezomyia Brèthes, 1914
123. Octodiplosis Giard, 1894
124. Odinadiplosis Mani, 1935
125. Oligoxenomyia Felt, 1927
126. Olpodiplosis Gagné, 1973
127. Oribremia Kieffer, 1913
128. Orseolia Kieffer & Massalongo, 1902
129. Orthodiplosis Kieffer, 1913
130. Ouradiplosis Felt, 1915
131. Pachydiplosis Kieffer, 1913
132. Perodiplosis Kieffer, 1913
133. Pilodiplosis Gagné, 1973
134. Pipaldiplosis Mani, 1943
135. Pitydiplosis Gagné, 1973
136. Platydiplosis Gagné, 1973
137. Plecophorus Kieffer, 1913
138. Plectrodiplosis Gagné, 1973
139. Plesiodiplosis Kieffer, 1912
140. Plutodiplosis Kieffer, 1912
141. Poridiplosis Fedotova, 2006
142. Proterodiplosis Wyatt, 1963
143. Pruthidiplosis Mani, 1934
144. Punarnavomyia Mani, 1953
145. Putoniella Kieffer, 1896
146. Quadridiplosis Fedotova, 2003
147. Raodiplosis Felt, 1920
148. Resseliella Seitner, 1906
149. Rotadiplosis Fedotova & Sidorenko, 2009
150. Ruidadiplosis Fedotova & Sidorenko, 2009
151. Schizodiplosis Kieffer, 1913
152. Setodiplosis Fedotova, 2006
153. Sicituradastra Fedotova & Sidorenko, 2009
154. Silvestriola Skuhravá, 1997
155. Skusemyia Kolesik, 1995
156. Stenohypodiplosis Fedotova, 2005
157. Stephodiplosis Tavares, 1908
158. Streptodiplosis Felt, 1916
159. Stroblophila Kieffer, 1912
160. Styraxdiplosis Tavares, 1915
161. Tetradiplosis Kieffer & Jörgensen, 1910
162. Thaumadiplosis Gagné, 1973
163. Thorodiplosis Felt, 1921
164. Thurauia Rübsaamen, 1899
165. Tokiwadiplosis Simbolon & Yukawa, 1992
166. Tollereadastra Fedotova & Sidorenko, 2009
167. Tribremia Kieffer, 1912
168. Tricholaba Rübsaamen, 1917
169. Tricontarinia Kieffer, 1910
170. Trigonodiplosis Rübsaamen, 1917
171. Trilobomyia Marikovskij, 1956
172. Trilobophora Marikovskij, 1953
173. Triommata Barnes, 1931
174. Trissodiplosis Kieffer, 1913
175. Trogodiplosis Gagné, 1985
176. Ussuridiplosis Fedotova, 2004
177. Vaccinidiplosis Gagné, 1994
178. Xenasphondylia Felt, 1915
179. Xenhormomyia Felt, 1920
180. Xenodiplosis Felt, 1911
181. Xylodiplosis Kieffer, 1895
182. Youngomyia Felt, 1908

=== Lasiopteridi ===
- Tribe Alycaulini - selected genera:
  - Alycaulus
  - Asteromyia
  - Astictoneura
  - Neolasioptera
- Tribe Brachineurini
  - Brachineura Rondani, 1840
  - Brachyneurina Mamaev, 1967
  - Mikiola Kieffer, 1912
  - Prolauthia Rübsaamen, 1915
- Tribe Lasiopterini
  - Baldratia Kieffer, 1897
  - Hybolasioptera Rübsaamen, 1915
  - Lasioptera Fischer von Waldheim\nMeigen, 1818
  - Ozirhincus Rondani, 1840
  - Stefaniella Kieffer, 1898
- Tribe Ledomyiini
  - Ledomyia Kieffer, 1895
- Tribe Oligotrophini - selected genera:
  - Craneiobia Kieffer, 1913
  - Cystiphora Kieffer, 1892
  - Dasineura Rondani, 1840
  - Iteomyia Kieffer, 1913
  - Janetiella Kieffer, 1898
  - Mayetiola Kieffer, 1896
  - Oligotrophus Latreille, 1805
  - Rabdophaga Westwood, 1847
  - Rhopalomyia Rübsaamen, 1892
  - Sackenomyia Felt, 1908

=== Stomatosematidi ===
All genera:

1. Didactylomyia Felt, 1911
2. Stomatosema Kieffer, 1913

== See also ==
- List of Cecidomyiinae genera
