= Gall =

Abnormal growths especially on plants induced by parasitic insects and other organisms

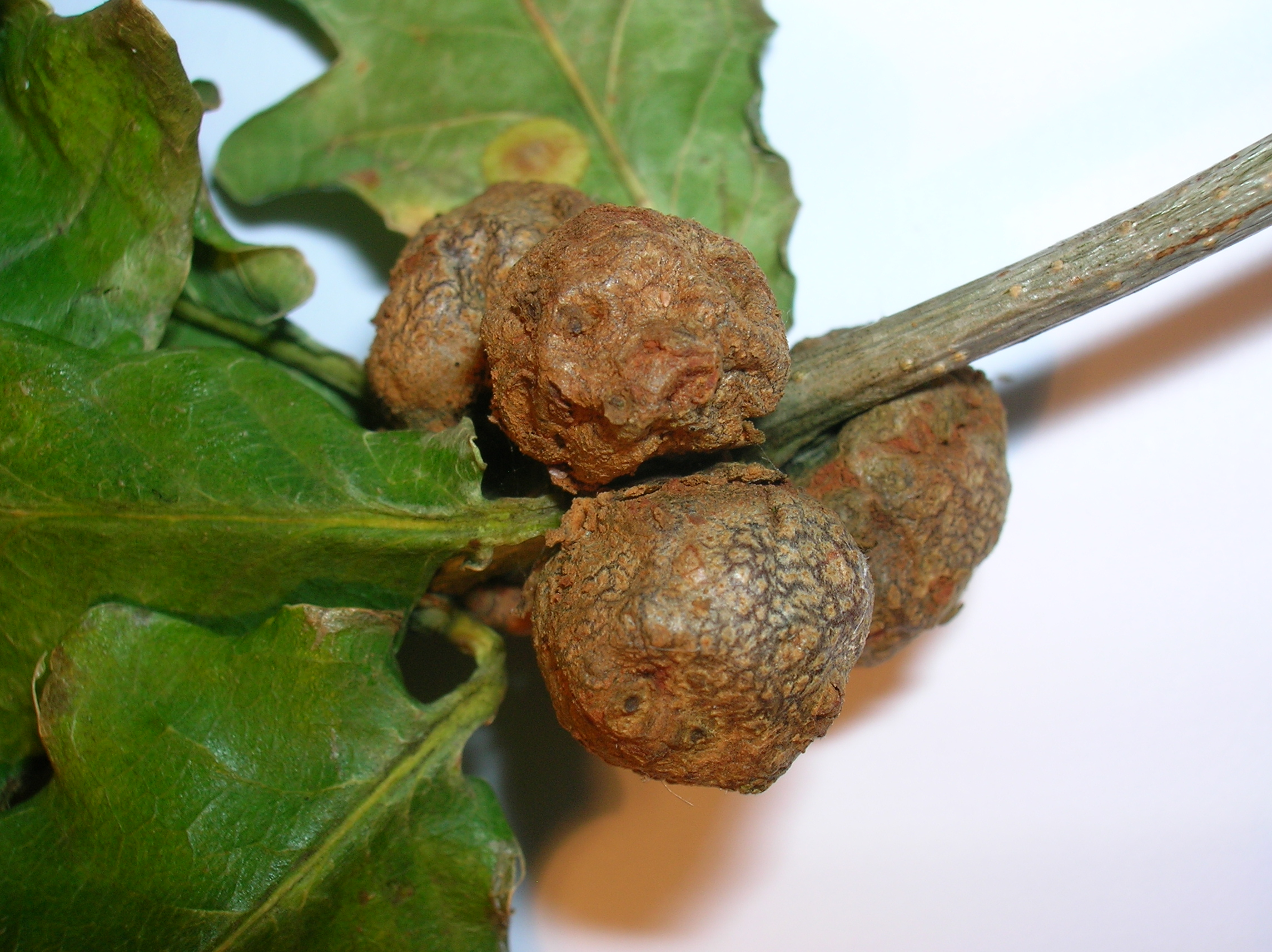
Cola-nut galls (Andricus lignicola) on pedunculate oak, caused by a cynipid gall wasp

Galls (from the Latin galla, 'oak-apple') or cecidia (from the Greek kēkidion, anything gushing out) are a kind of swelling growth on the external tissues of plants. Plant galls are abnormal outgrowths of plant tissues, similar to benign tumors or warts in animals. They can be caused by various parasites, from viruses, fungi and bacteria, to other plants, insects and mites. Plant galls can be such highly organized structures that their cause can be determined without the actual agent being identified. This applies particularly to insect and mite plant galls. The study of plant galls is known as cecidology.

== Taxonomic range ==
Plant galls are caused by a wide range of organisms, including animals such as insects, mites, and nematodes; fungi; bacteria; viruses; and other plants.

=== Insects ===
Insect galls are the highly distinctive plant structures formed by some herbivorous insects as their own microhabitats. They are plant tissue which is controlled by the insect. Galls act as both the habitat and food source for the maker of the gall. The interior of a gall can contain edible nutritious starch and other tissues. Some galls act as "physiologic sinks", concentrating resources in the gall from the surrounding plant parts. Galls may also provide the insect with physical protection from predators.

Insect galls are usually induced by chemicals injected by the larvae of the insects into the plants and possibly mechanical damage. After the galls are formed, the larvae develop inside until fully grown, when they leave. To form galls, the insects must take advantage of the time when plant cell division occurs quickly: the growing season, usually spring in temperate climates, but which is extended in the tropics.

The meristems, where plant cell division occurs, are the usual sites of galls, though insect galls can be found on other parts of the plant, such as the leaves, stalks, branches, buds, roots, and even flowers and fruits. Gall-inducing insects are usually species-specific and sometimes tissue-specific on the plants they gall.

Gall-inducing insects include gall wasps, gall midges, gall flies, leaf-miner flies, aphids, scale insects, psyllids, thrips, gall moths, and weevils.

Many gall insects remain to be described. Estimates range up to more than 210,000 species, not counting parasitoids of gall-forming insects.

==== Cynipid wasps ====
More than 1400 species of cynipid wasps cause galls. Some 1000 of these are in the tribe Cynipini, their hosts mostly being oak trees and other members of the Fagaceae (the beech tree family). These are often restricted taxonomically to a single host species or a group of related species.

Cynipid wasp galls

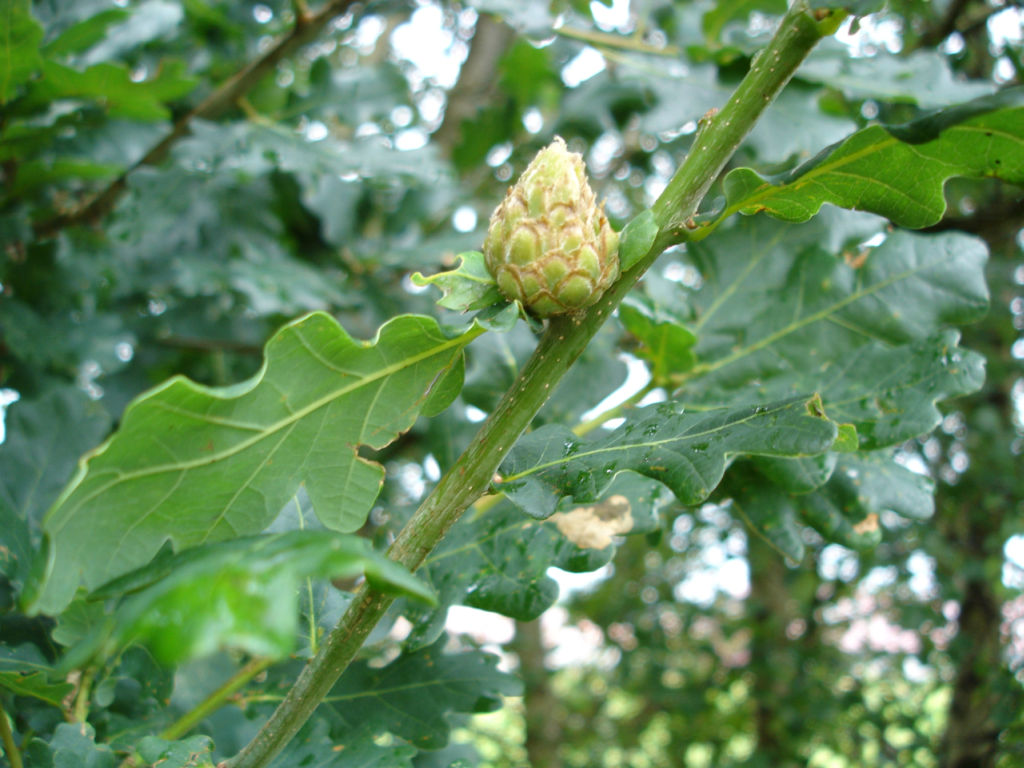
Oak artichoke gall caused by Andricus foecundatrix

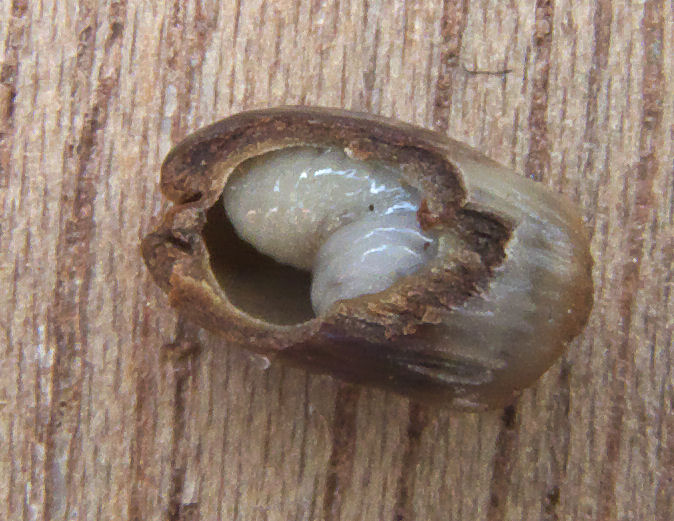
Artichoke gall cut open to reveal wasp larva

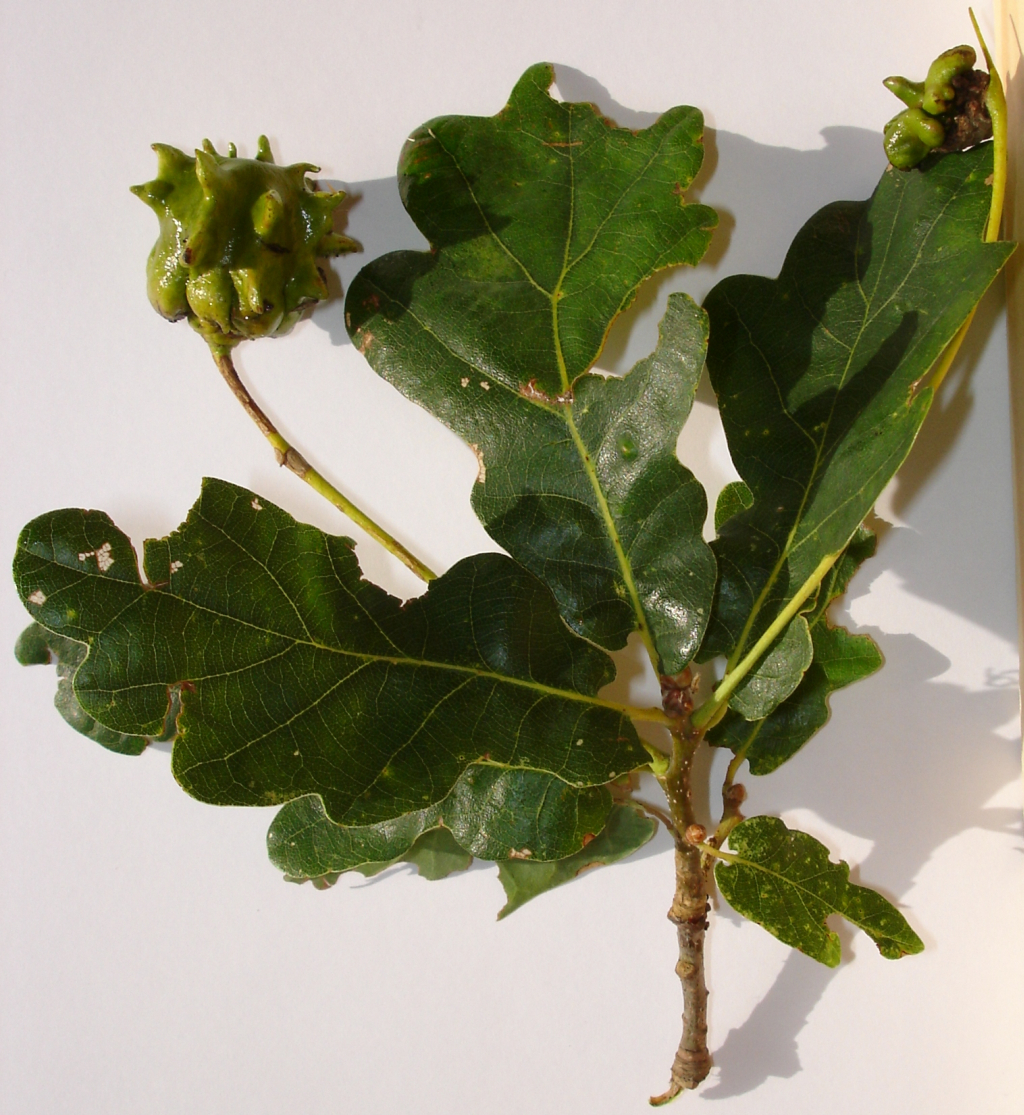
Knopper gall caused by Andricus quercuscalicis

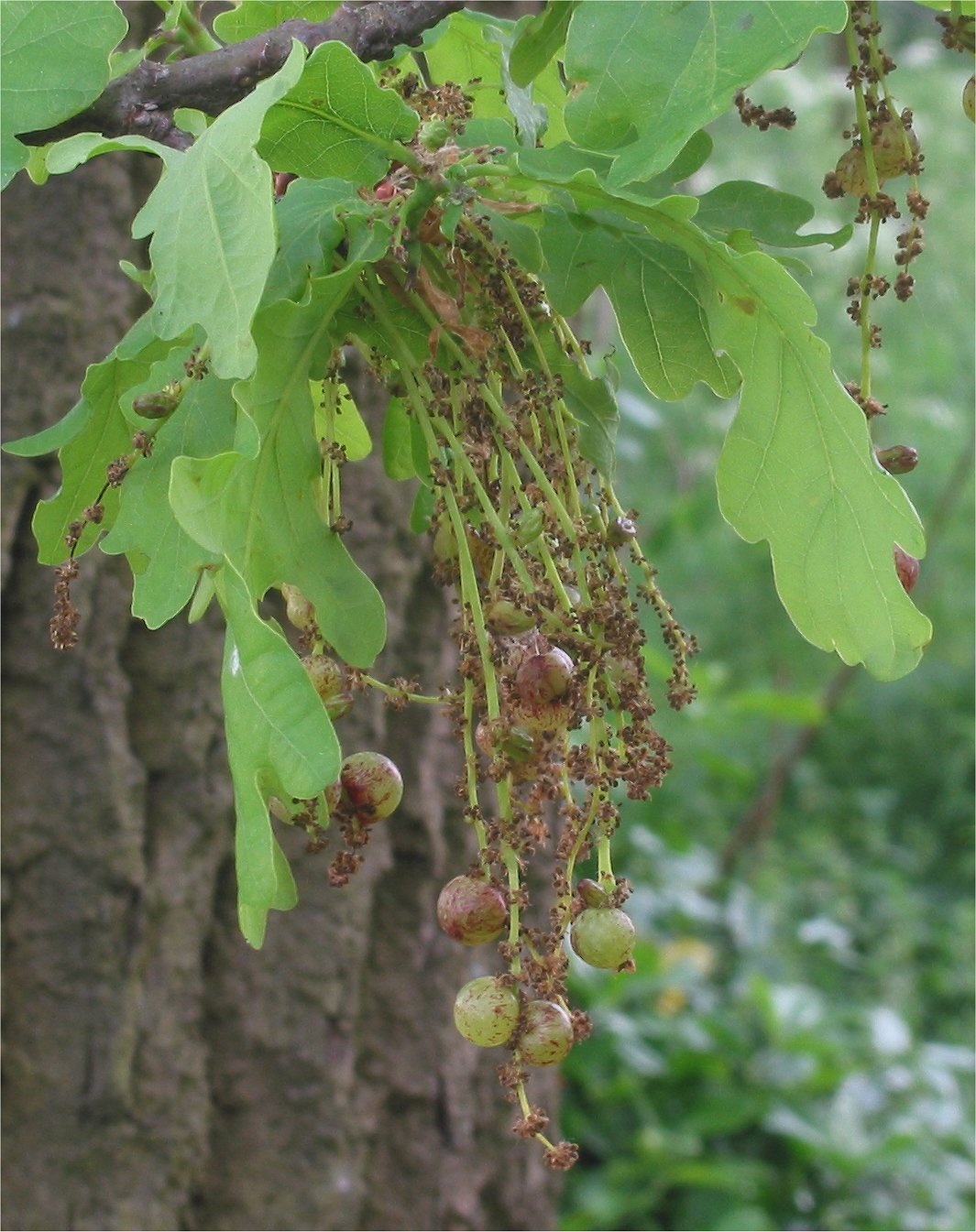
Oak gall caused by Neuroterus albipes forma laeviusculus

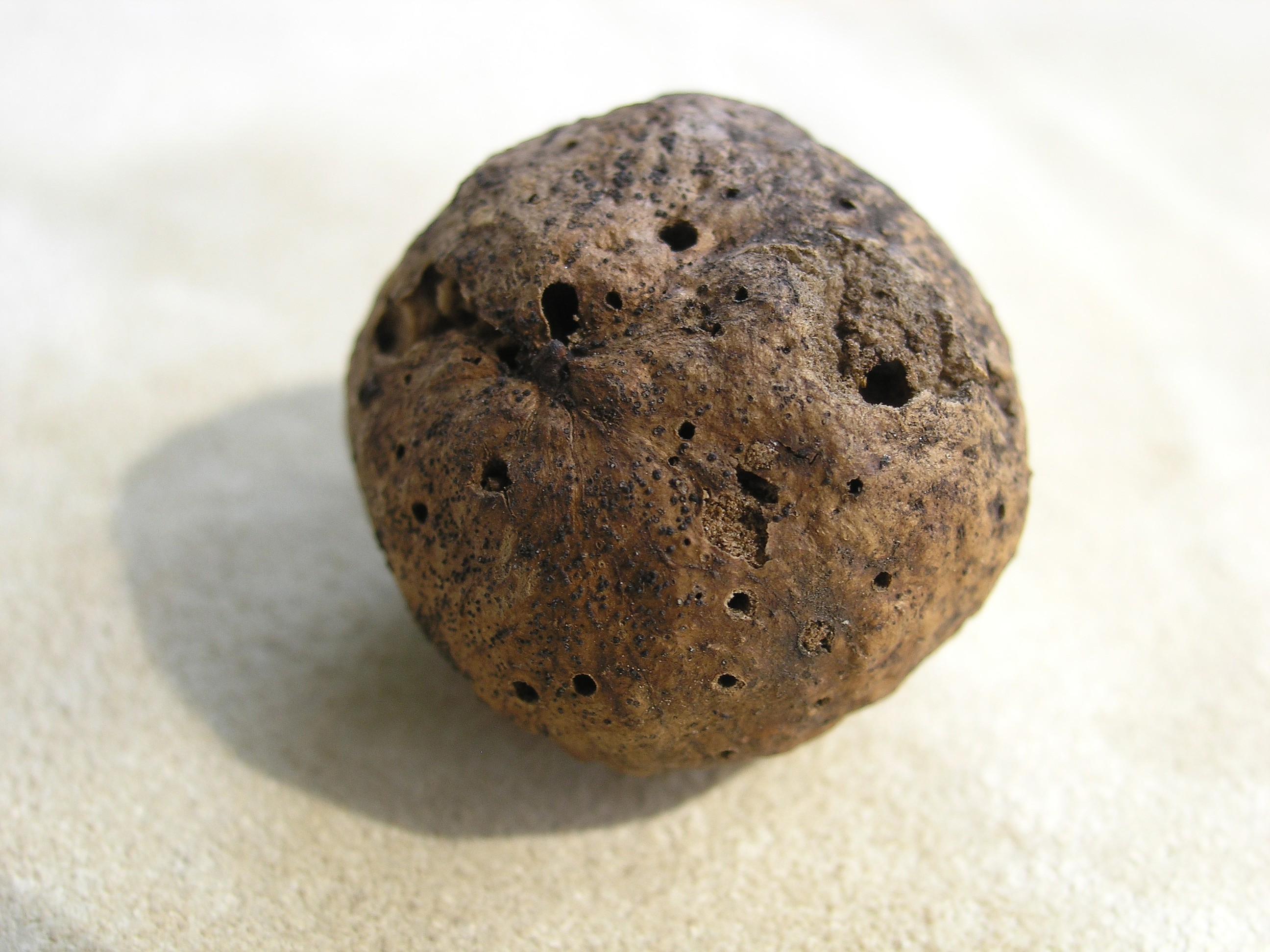
Marble gall of oak caused by Andricus kollari

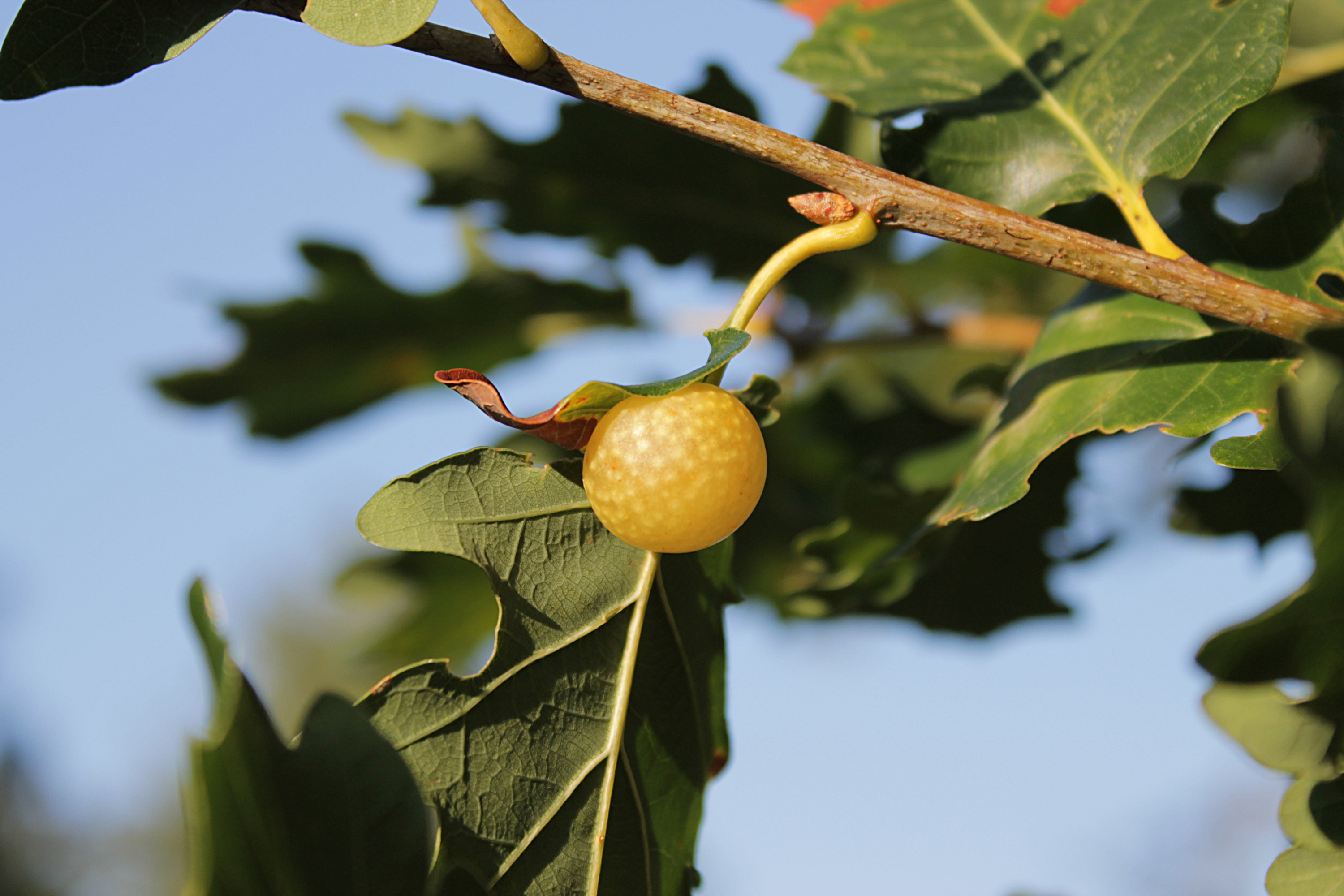
Cherry oak gall caused by Cynips quercusfolii

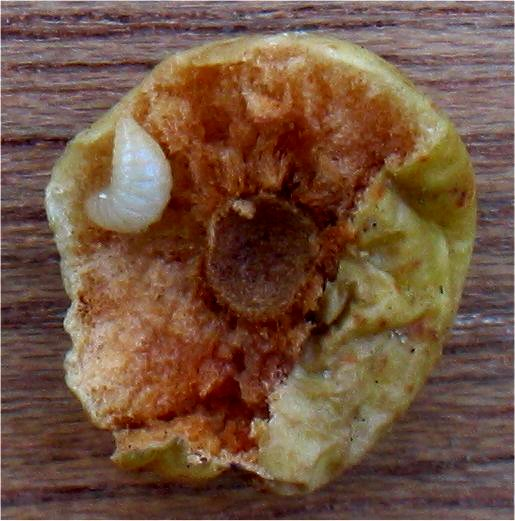
Cherry oak gall cut open to reveal wasp larva

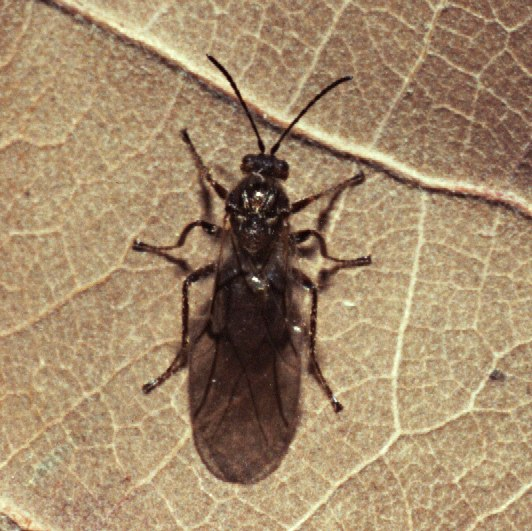
Cherry oak gall wasp adult

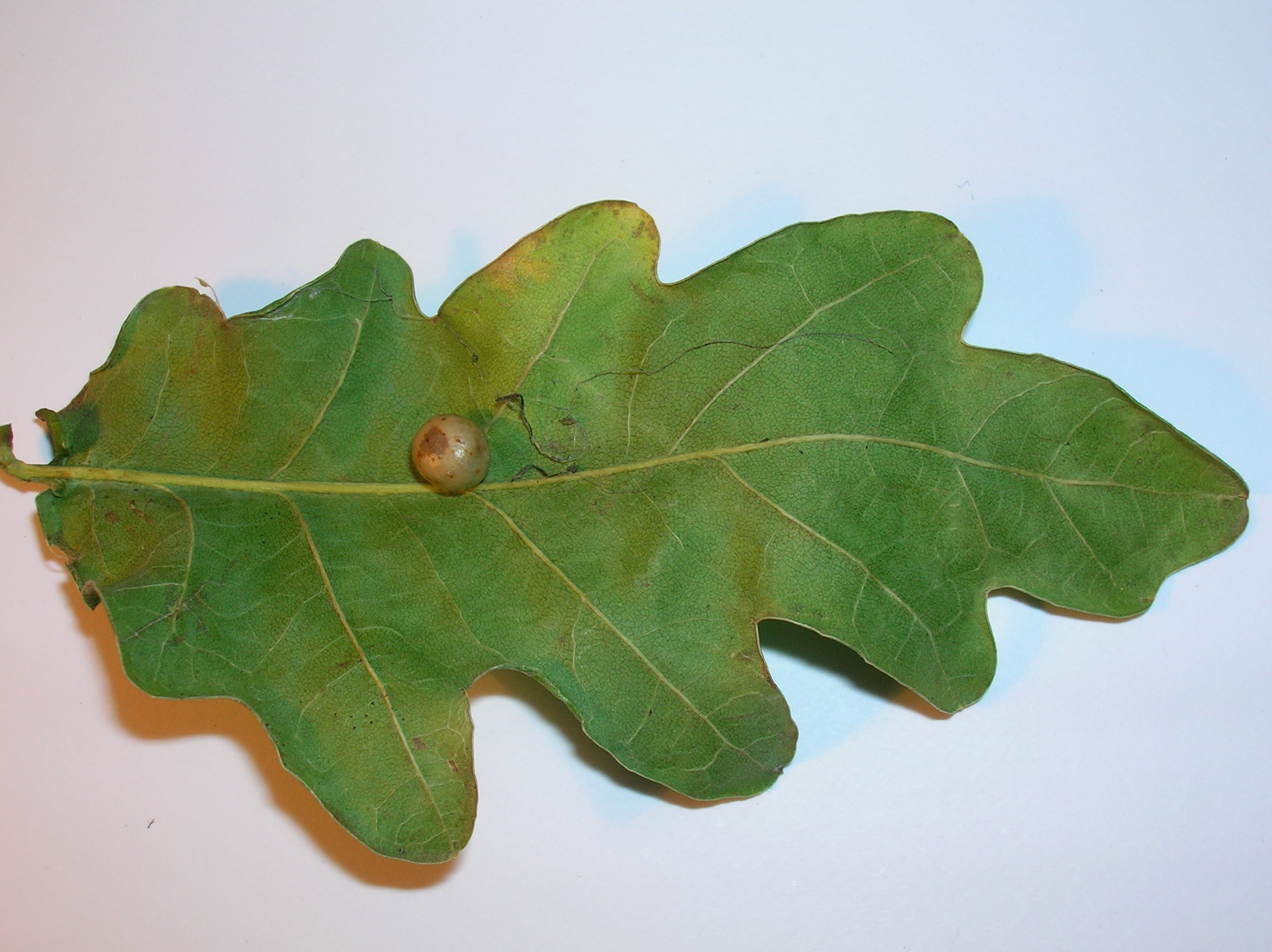
Red-pea gall (Cynips divisa) on pedunculate oak

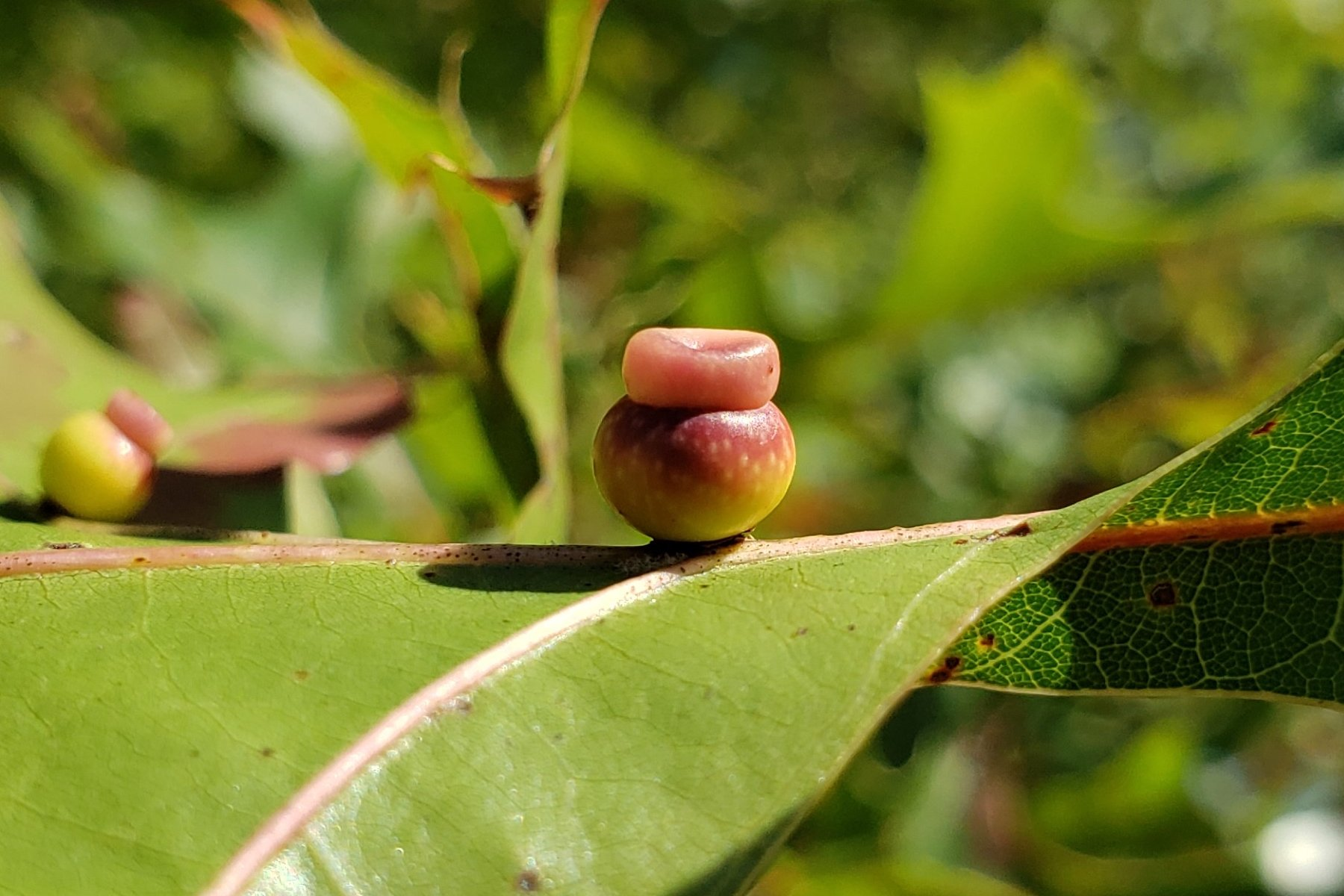
Kokkocynips rileyi oak gall

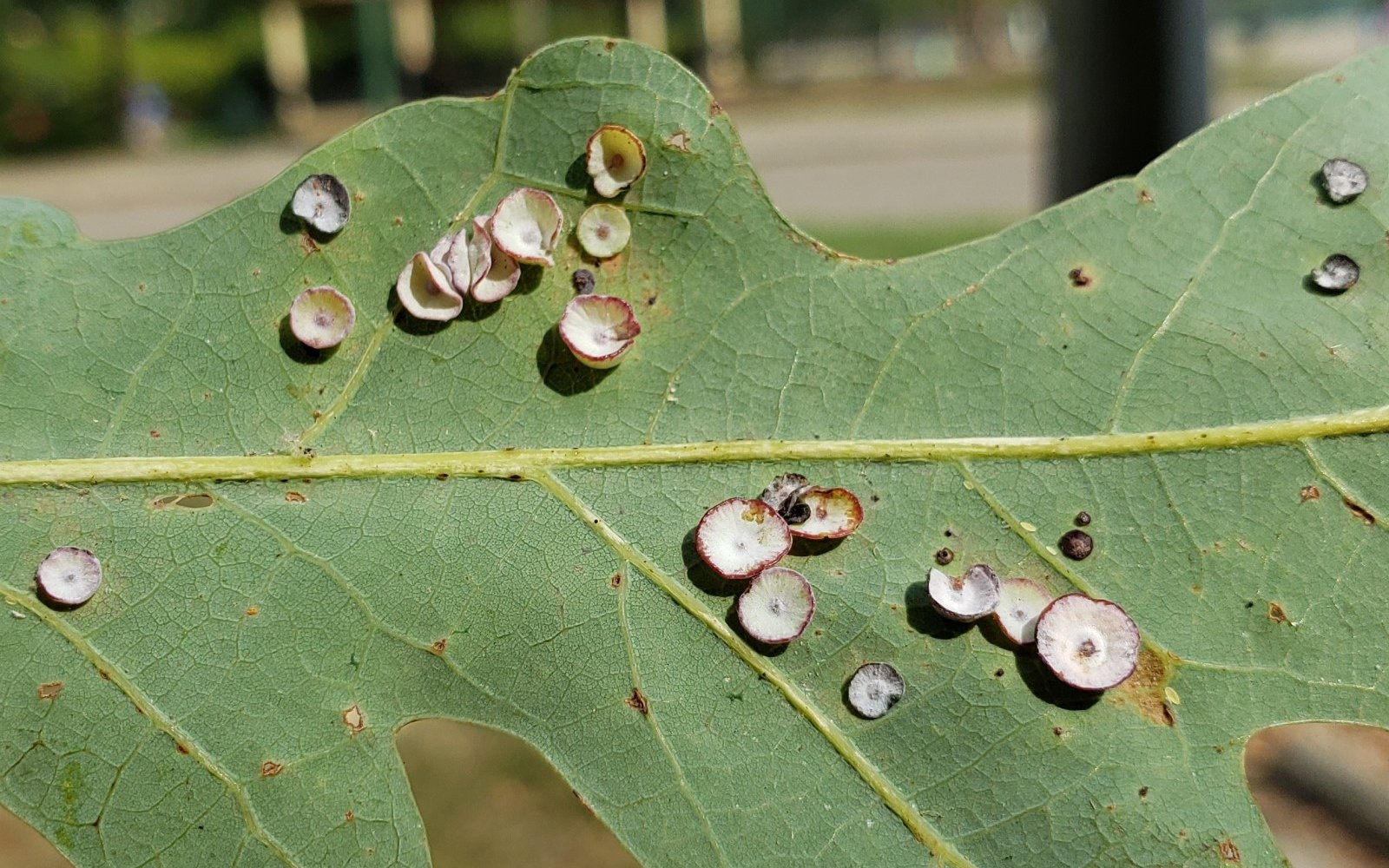
Phylloteras poculum oak galls

==== Non-cynipid wasps ====
Some wasps from other groups, such as the Diplolepididae and the Chalcidoidea, also cause plant galls.

Non-cynipid wasp galls

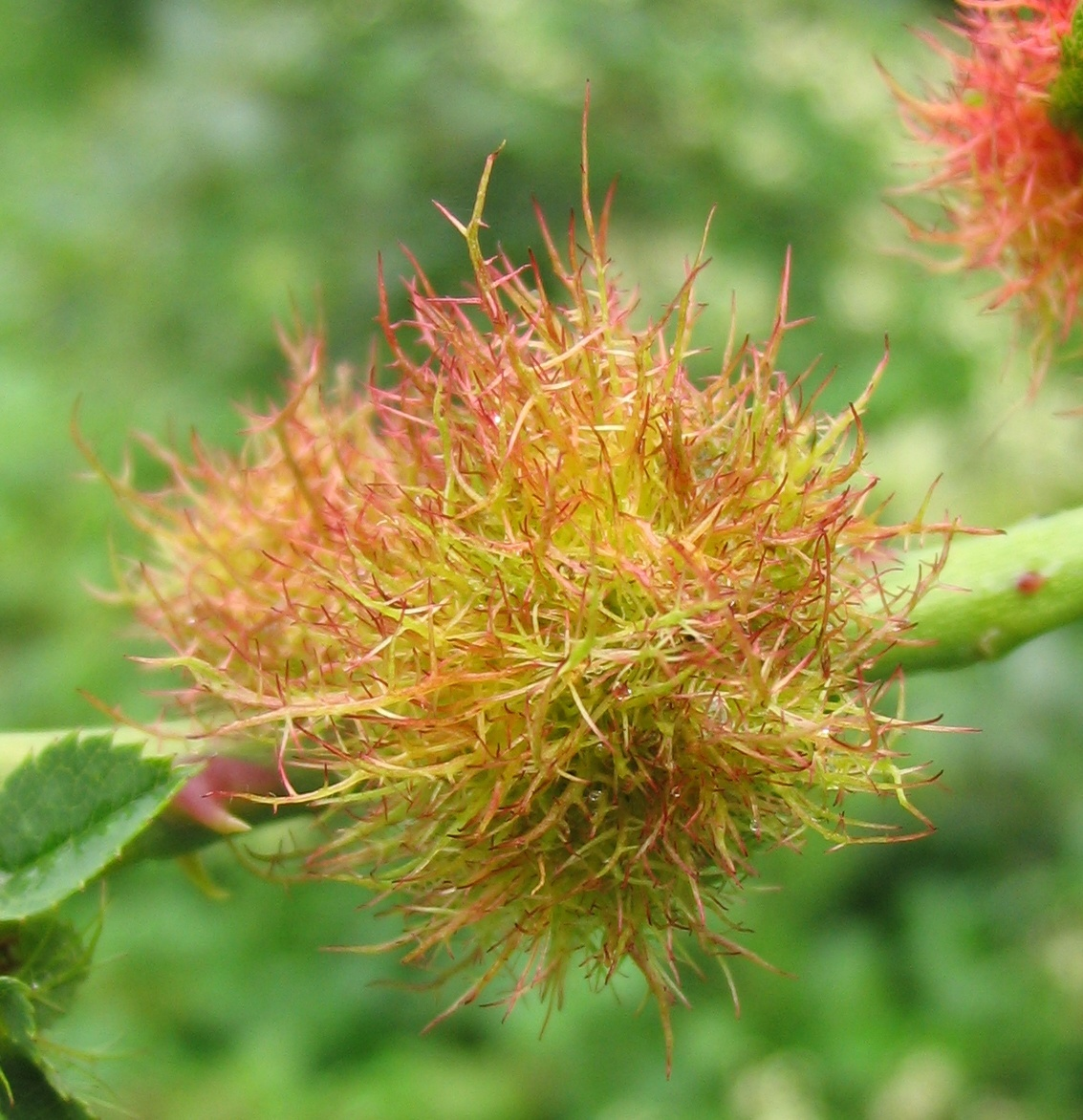
Rose bedeguar gall on a wild rose, caused by Diplolepis rosae, a diplolepid wasp

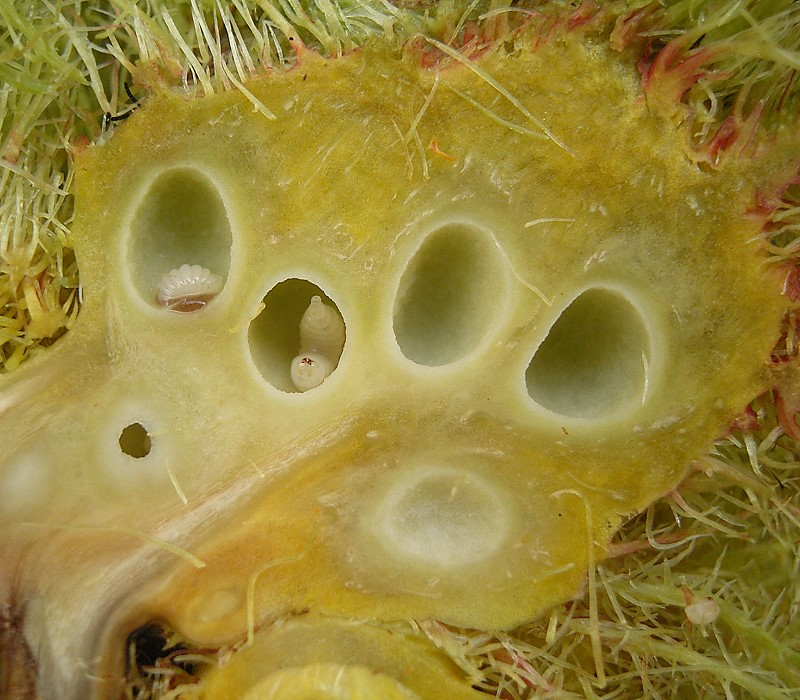
Section through young bedeguar gall showing wasp larvae and cells

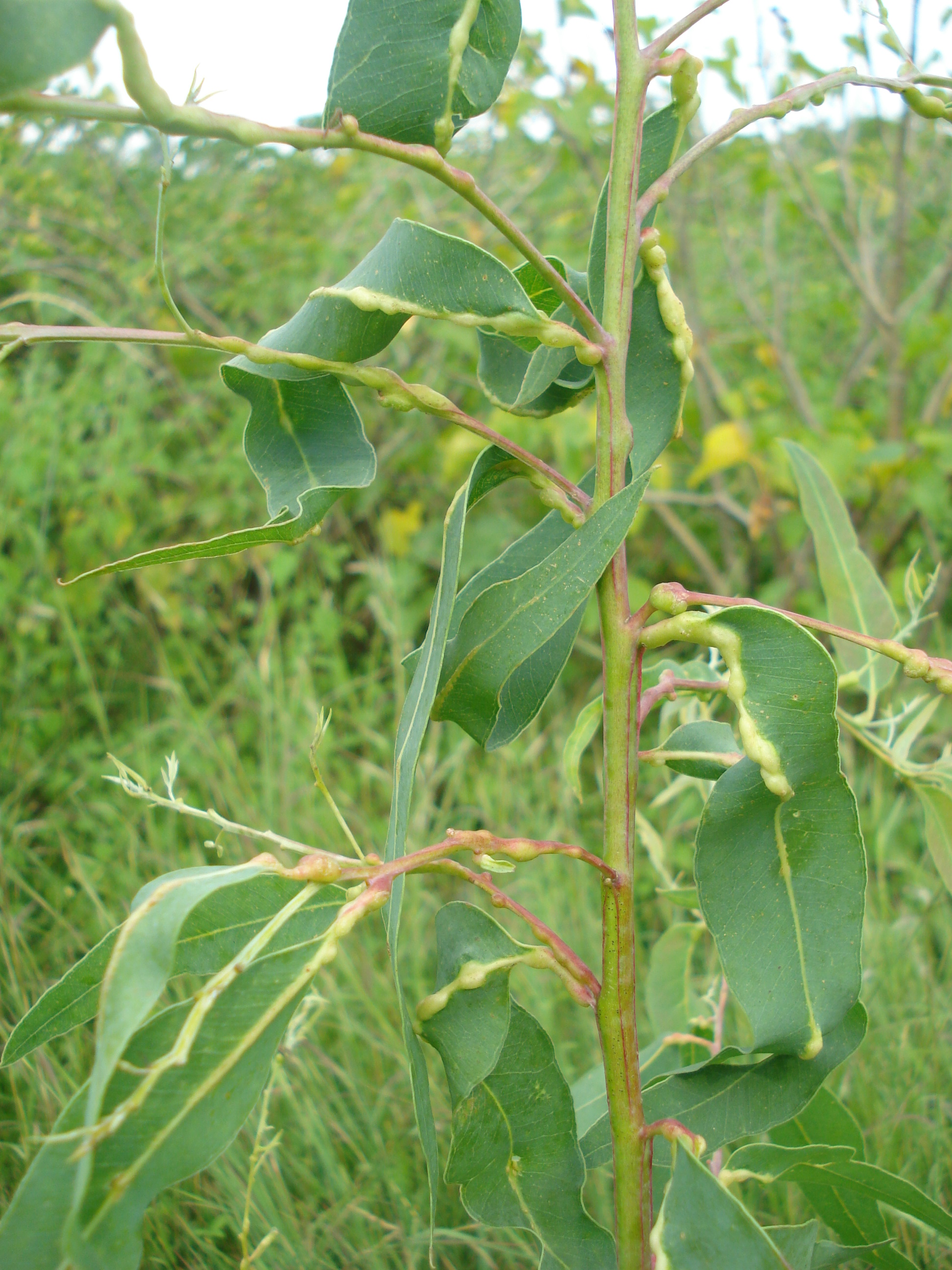
Gall on Eucalyptus due to chalcid wasp Leptocybe invasa, India

==== Hemipteran bugs ====
Among the hemipteran bugs that cause galls are the psyllid bug Pachypsylla celtidisumbilicus, and the woolly aphid Adelges abietis, which parasitises coniferous trees such as the Sitka spruce and the Norway spruce.

Hemipteran galls

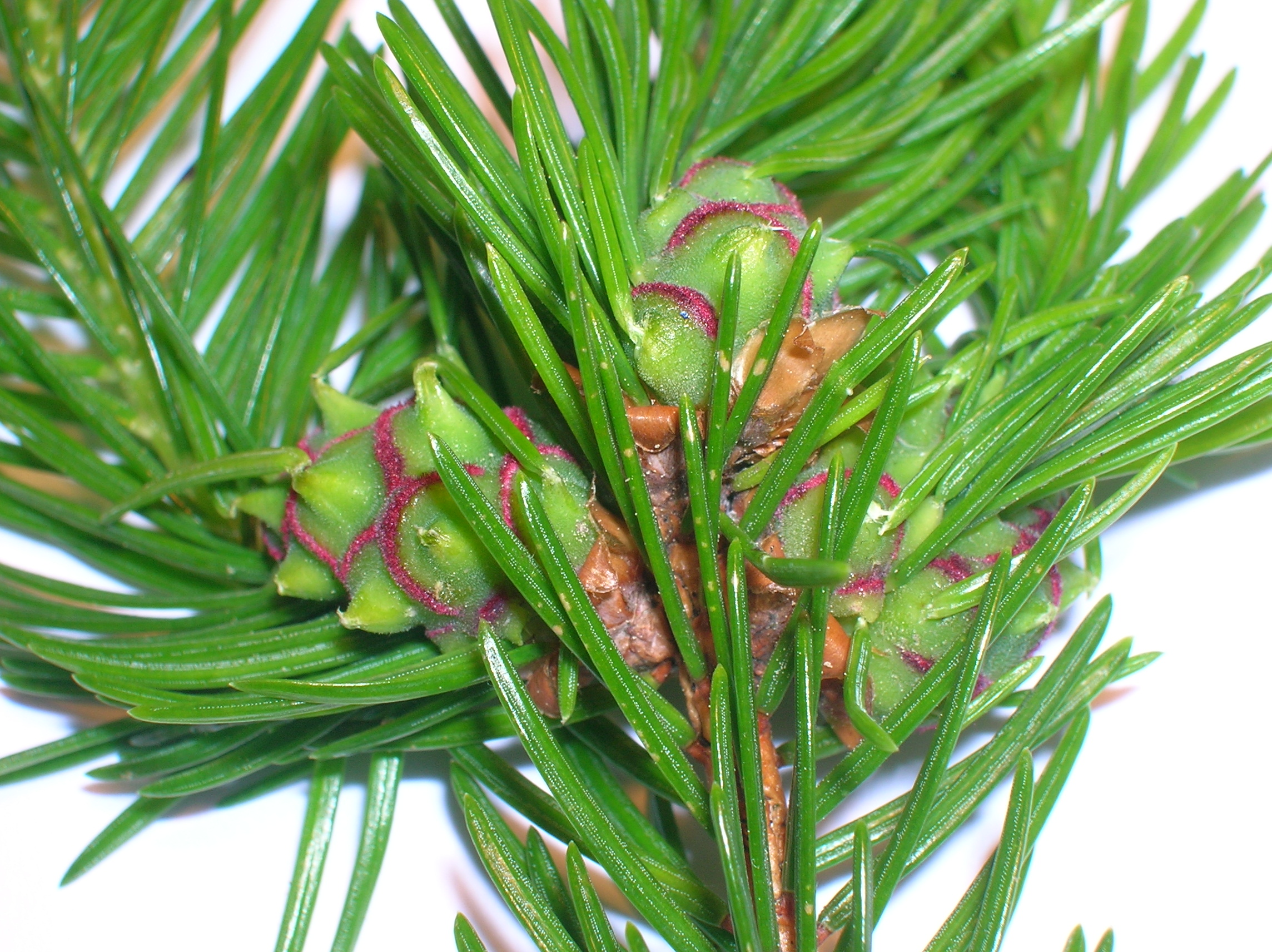
Developing pineapple pseudocone galls on Norway spruce, caused by woolly aphid Adelges abietis

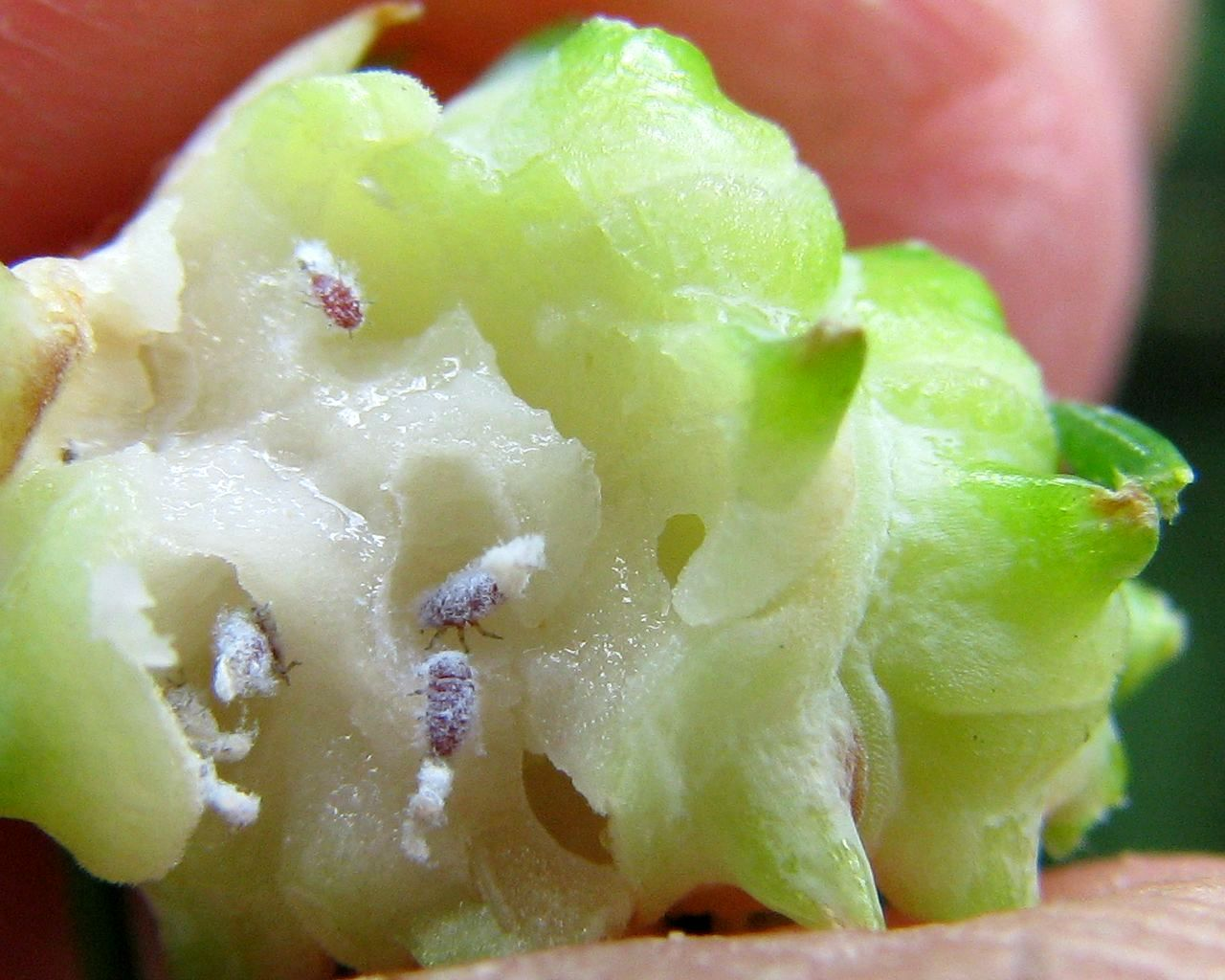
Pineapple gall cut open to show the woolly aphid larvae inside

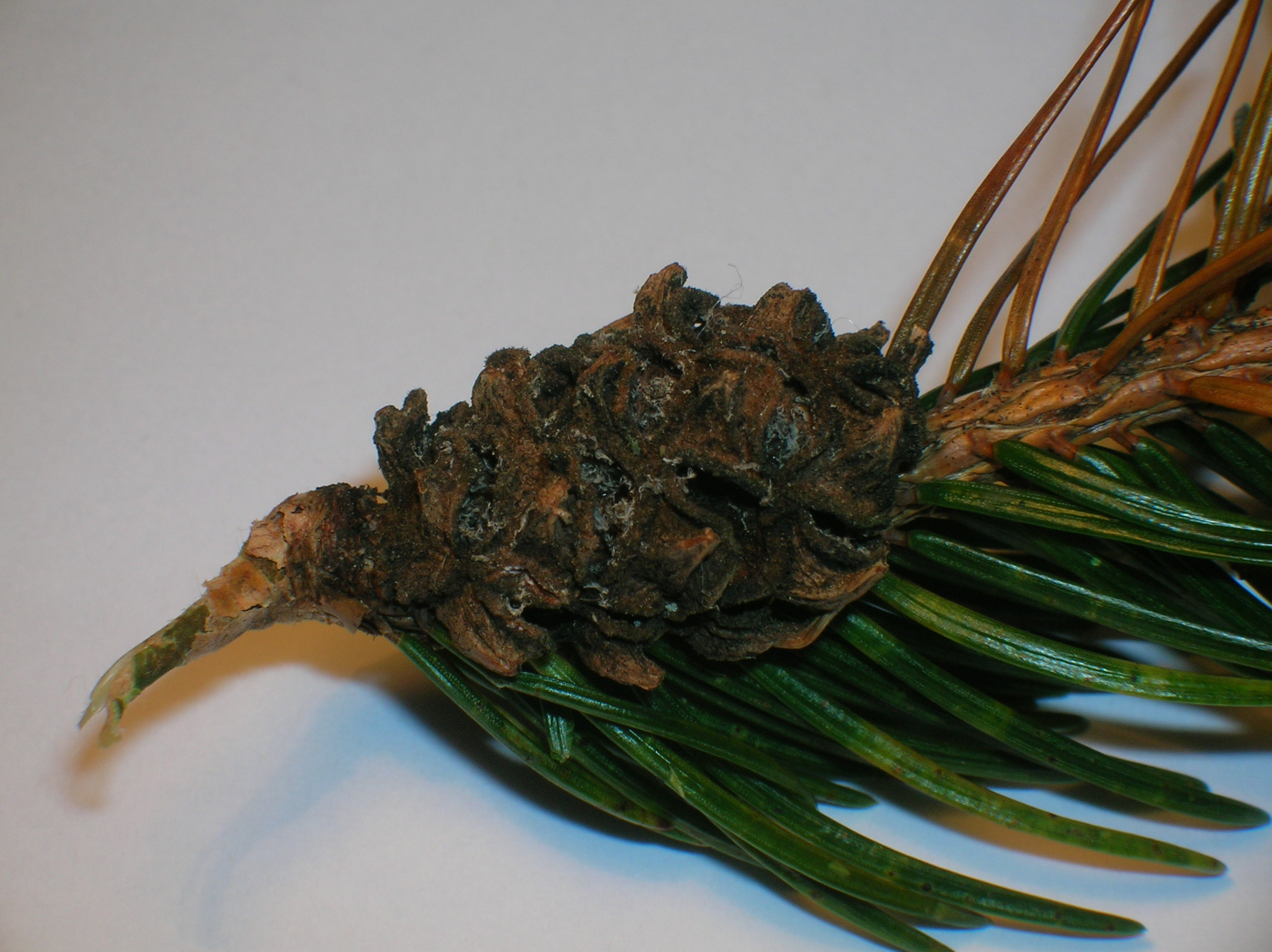
Pineapple gall on Sitka spruce caused by Adelges abietis

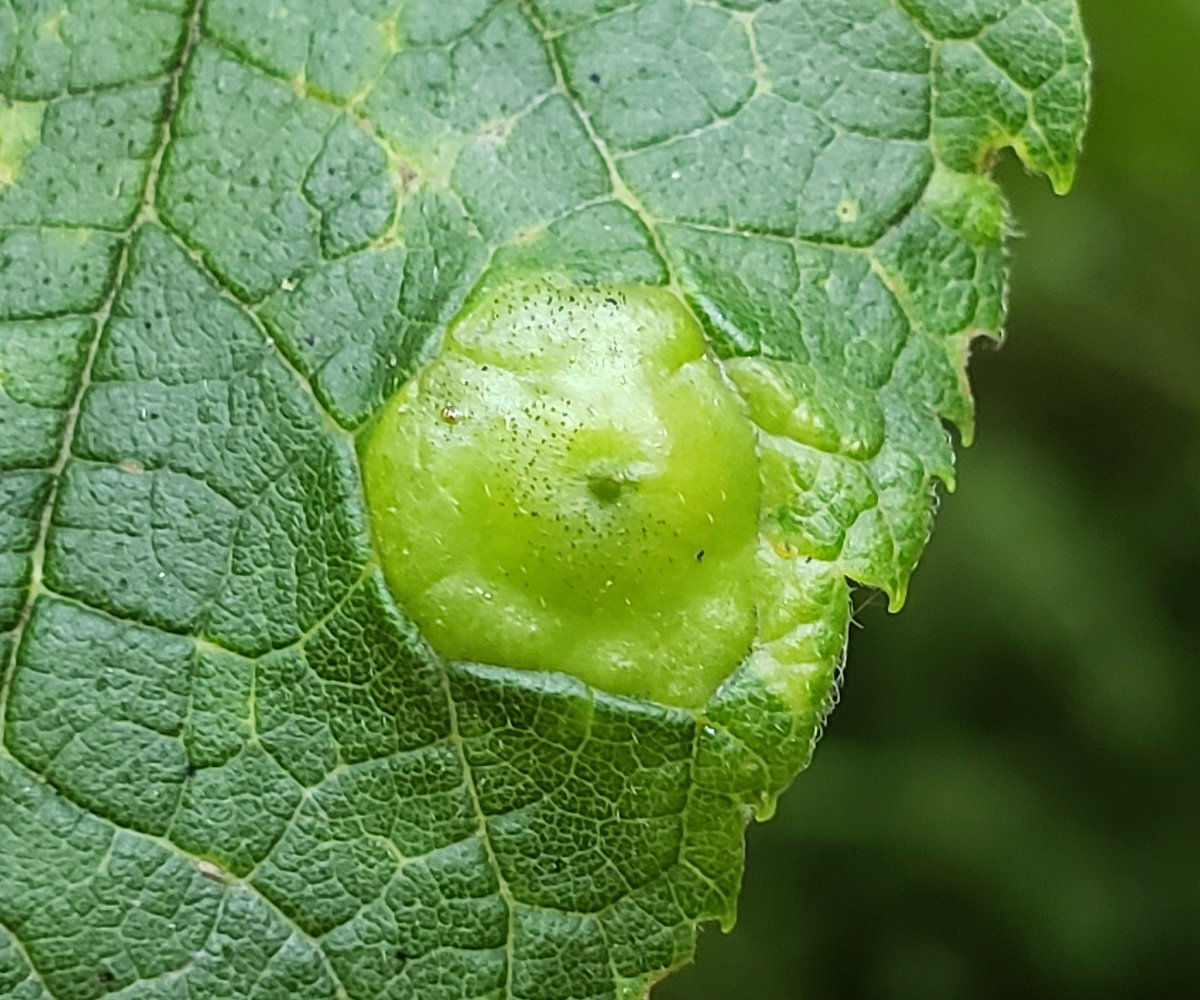
Pachypsylla celtidisumbilicus hackberry gall

==== Dipteran flies ====
Some dipteran flies such as the cecidomyiid gall midges Dasineura investita and Neolasioptera boehmeriae, and some Agromyzidae leaf-miner flies cause galls.

Midge galls

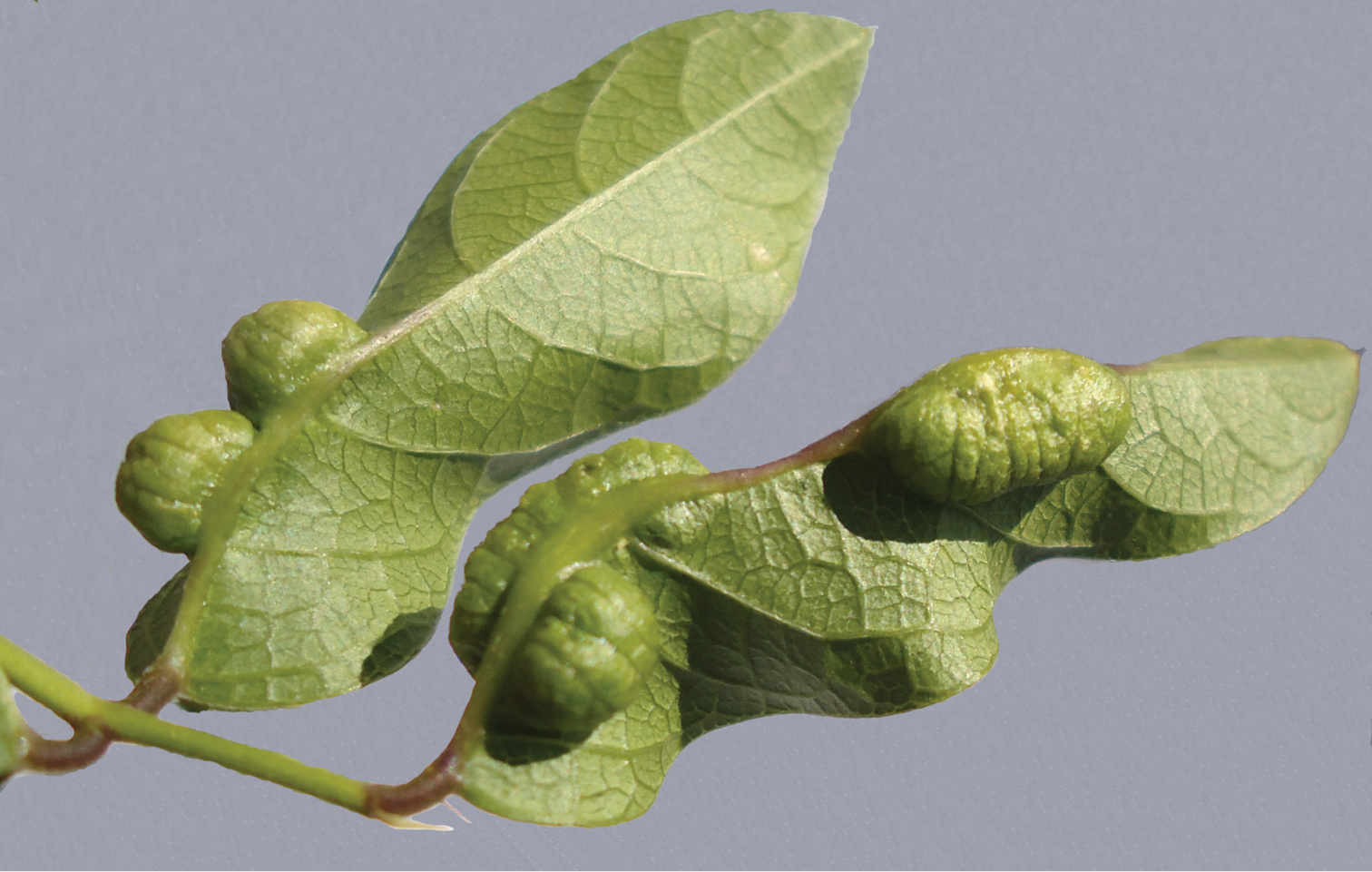
Gall of Japanagromyza inferna (Agromyzidae) in Centrosema virginianum

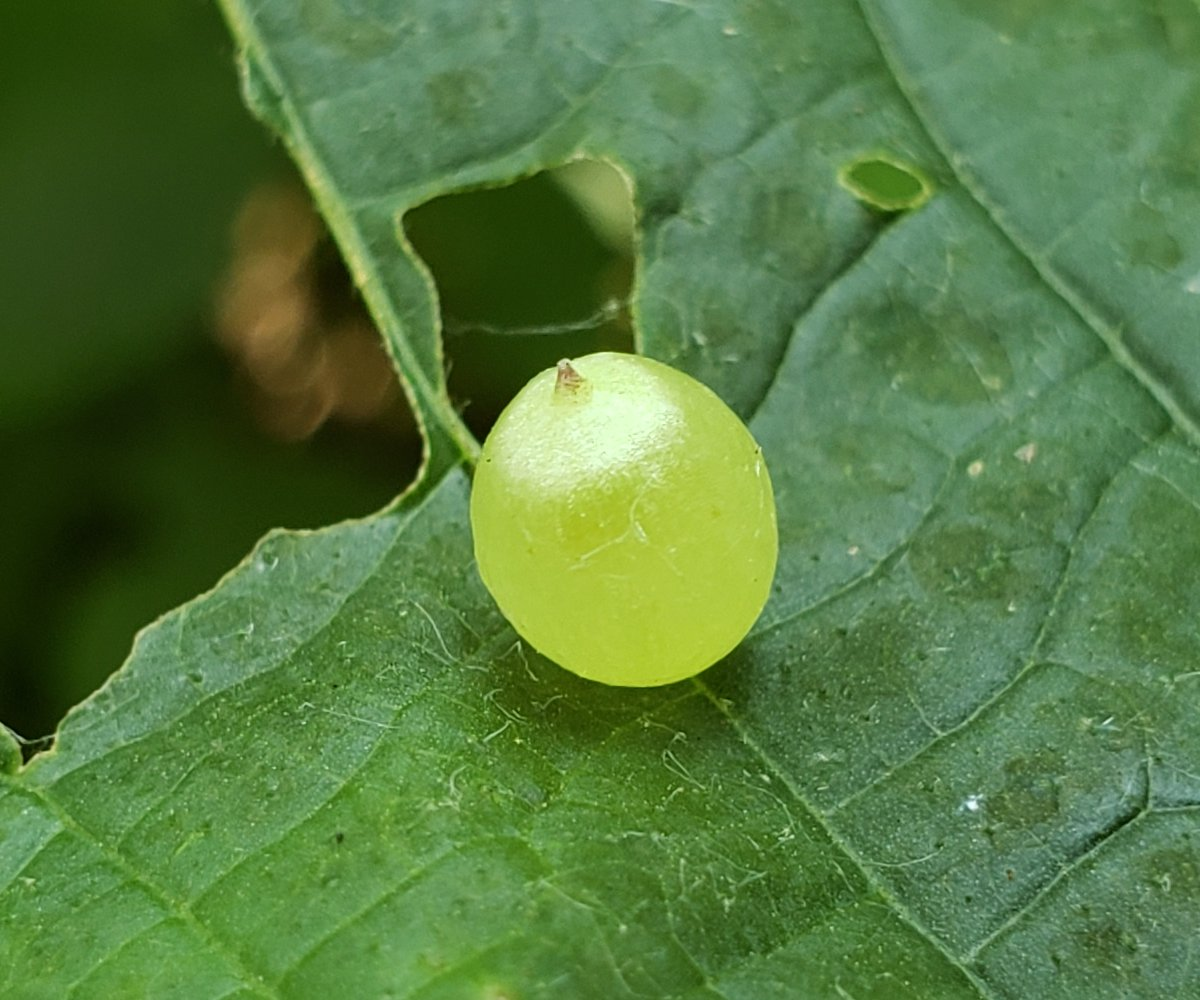
Nettle gall caused by Dasineura investita (Cecidomyiidae)

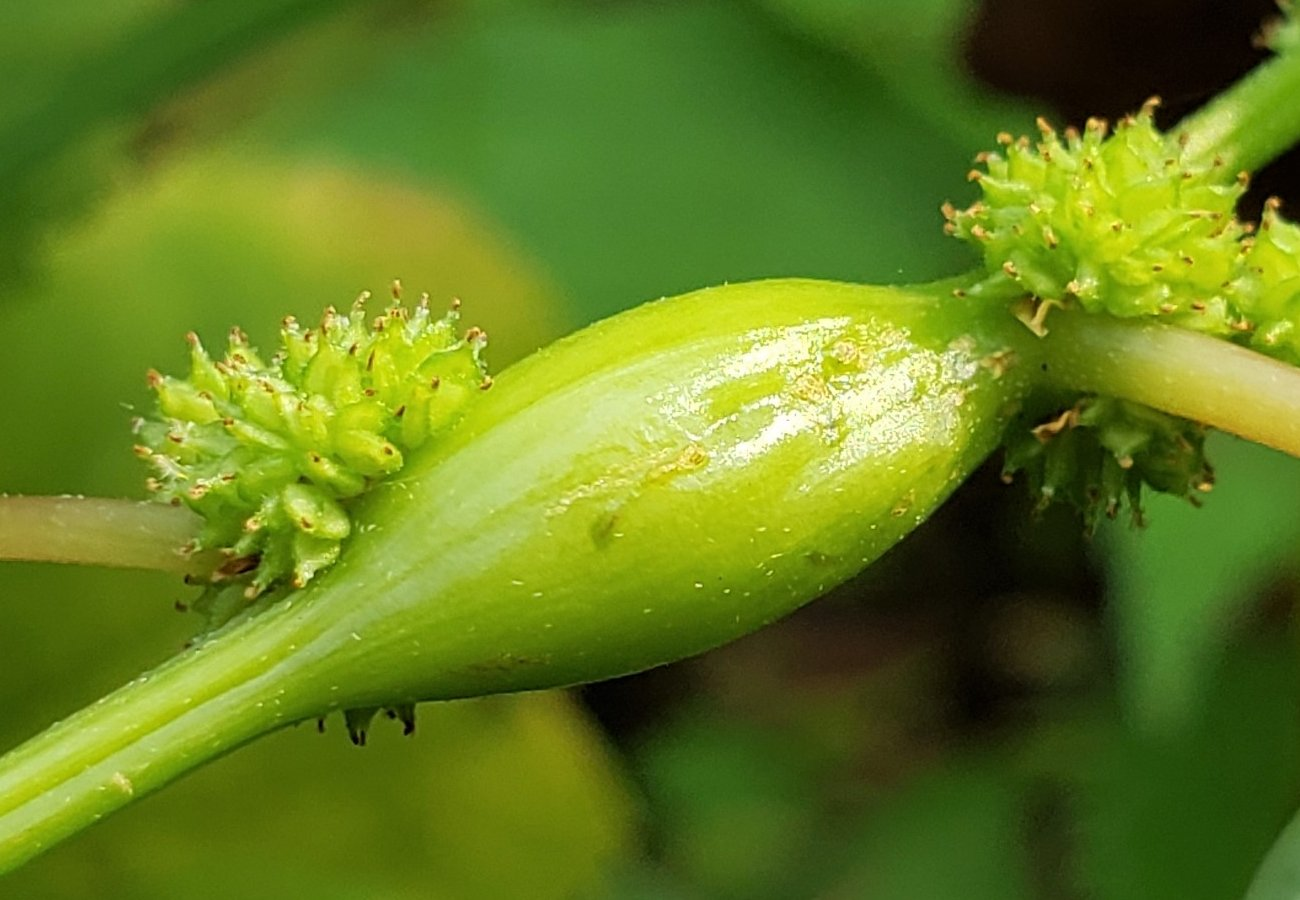
False nettle stem gall caused by gall midge Neolasioptera boehmeriae (Cecidomyiidae)

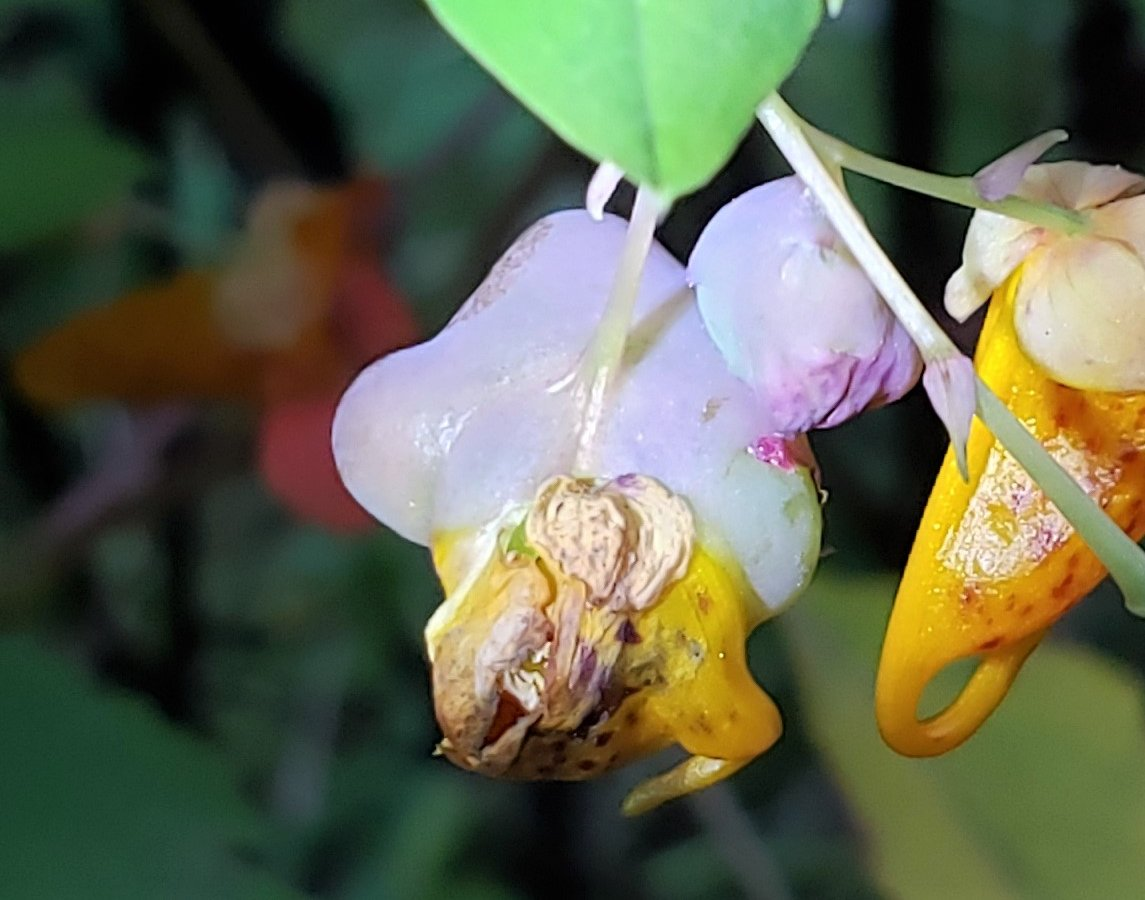
Schizomyia impatientis (Cecidomyiidae) jewelweed flower gall

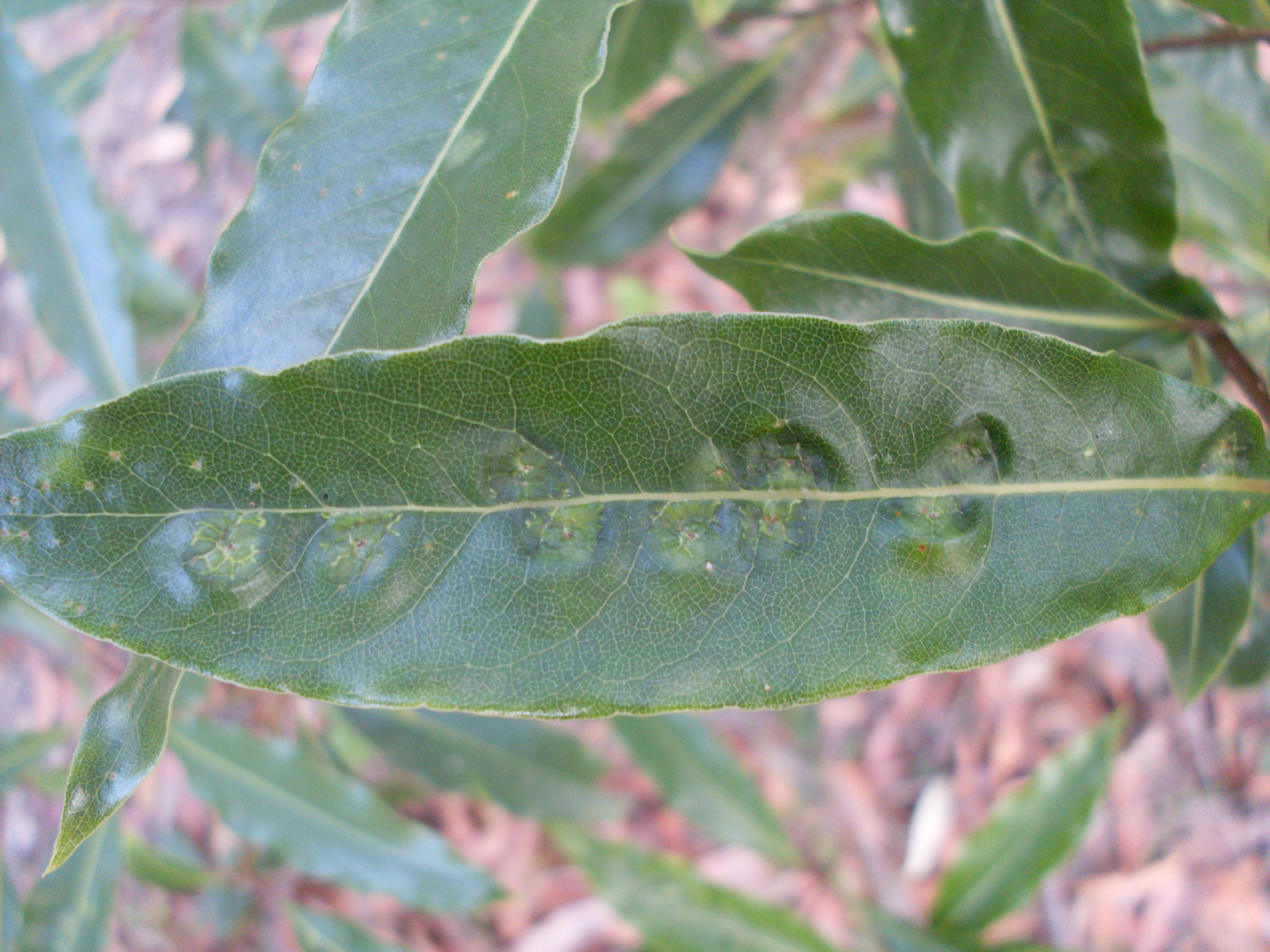
Phytoliriomyza pittosporophylli (Agromyzidae) galls in leaf of Pittosporum undulatum

=== Mites ===
Mites in the family Eriophyidae often cause galls to form on their hosts. The family contains more than 3,000 described species which attack a wide variety of plants.

Mite galls

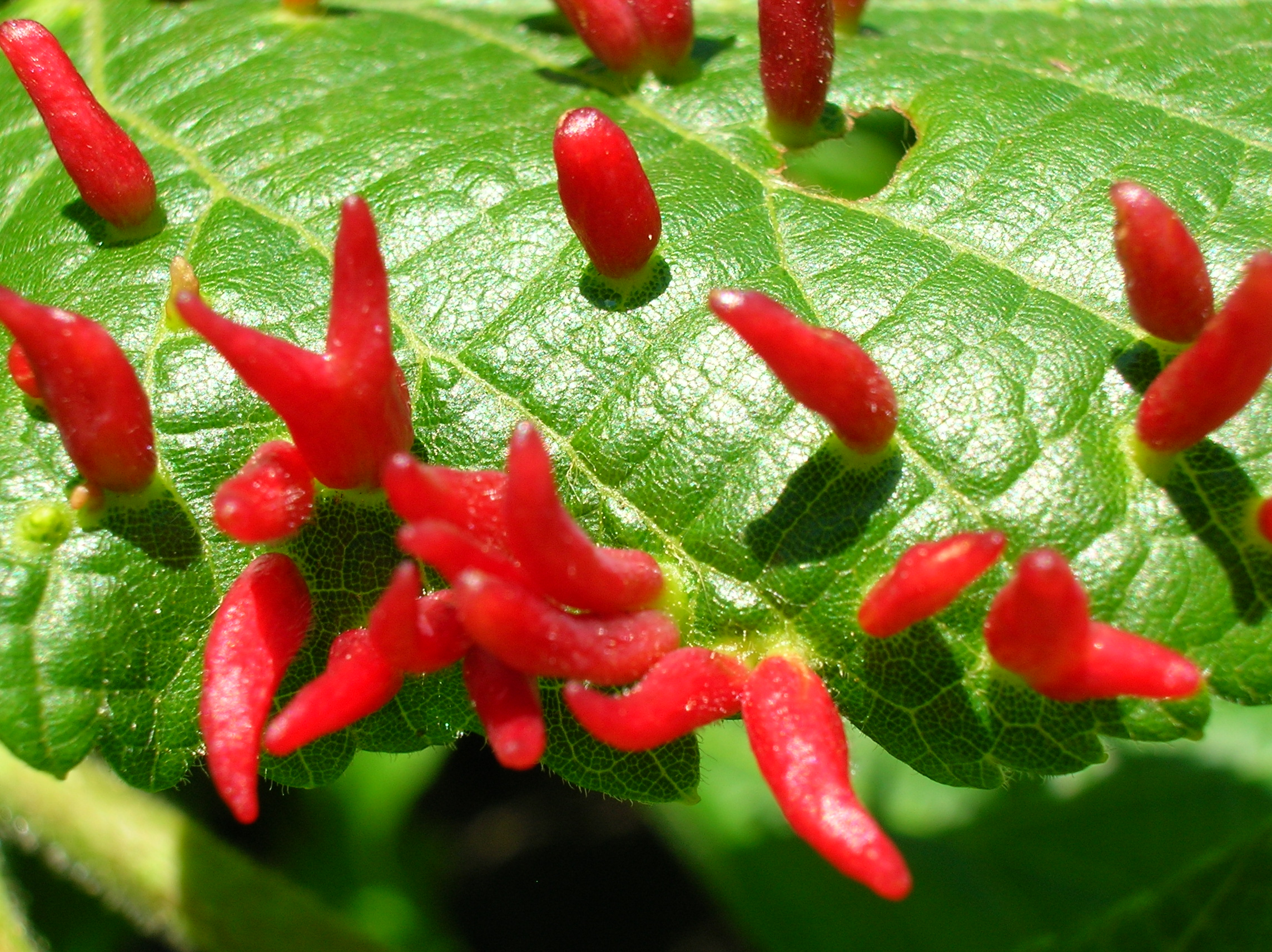
Lime nail galls caused by the mite Eriophyes tiliae

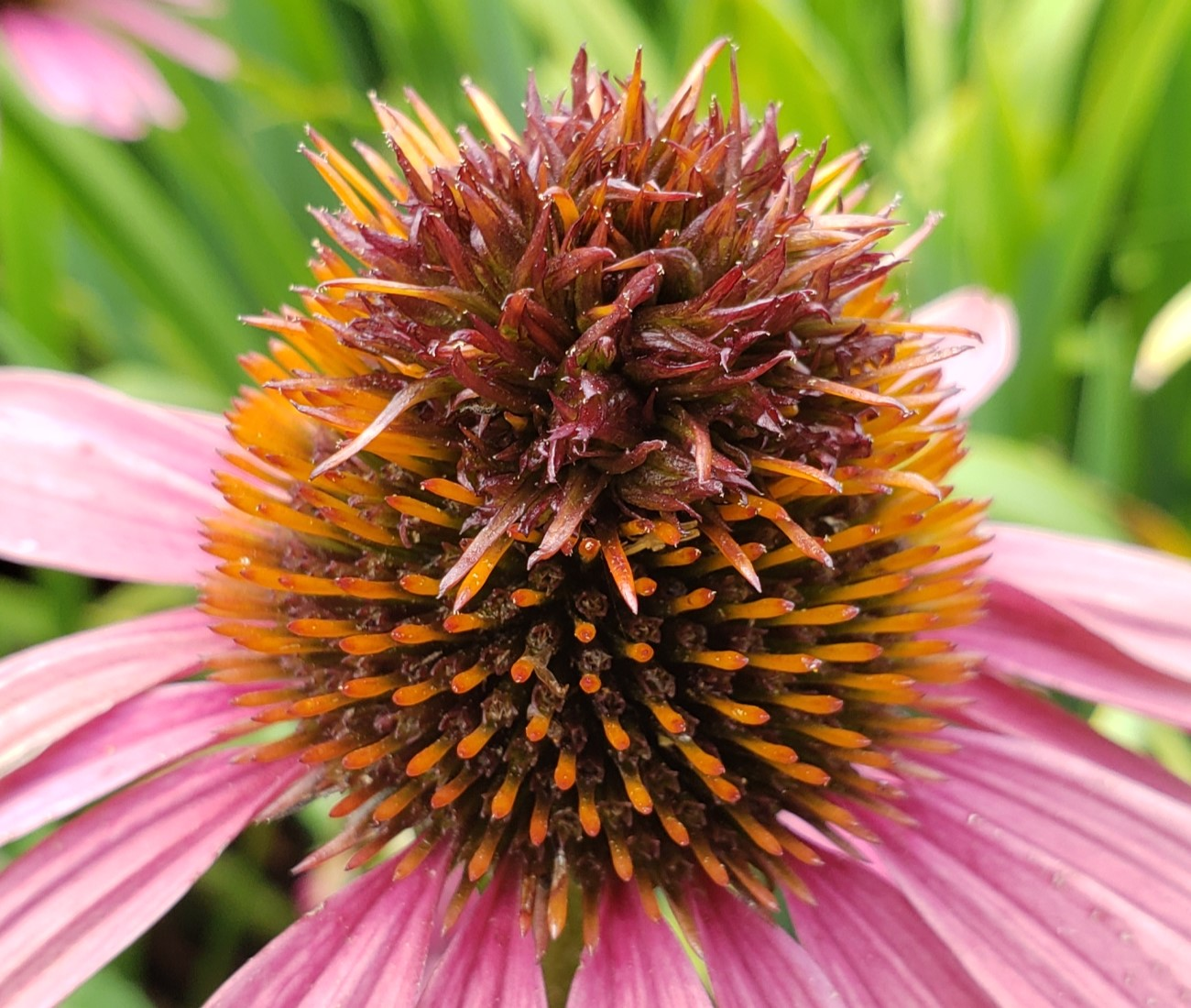
Galls on purple coneflower caused by an undescribed mite species

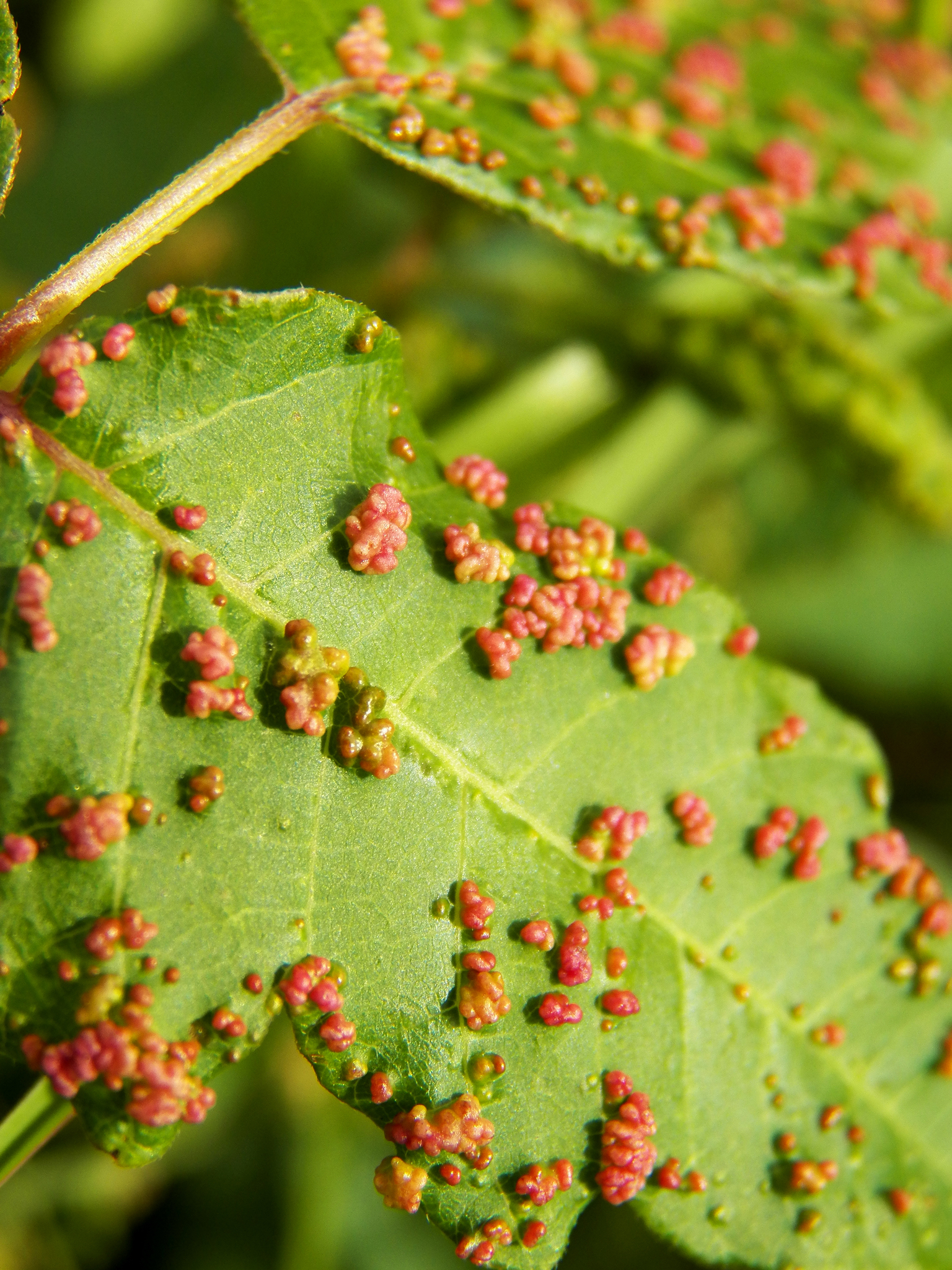
Poison ivy leaf galls caused by Aculops rhois

=== Nematodes ===
Nematodes are microscopic worms that live in soil. Some nematodes (Meloidogyne species or root-knot nematodes) cause galls on the roots of susceptible plants. The galls are often small.

Nematode galls

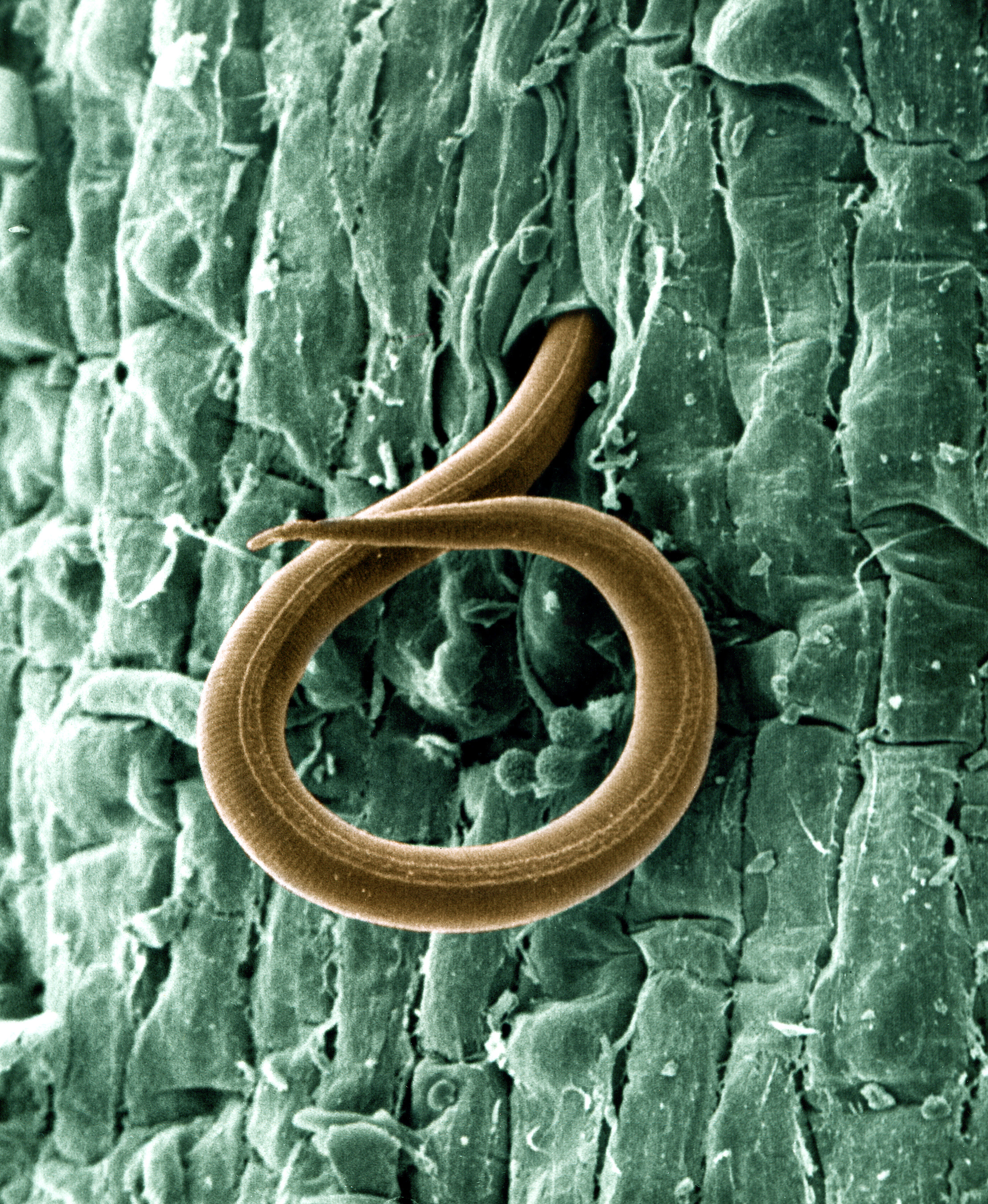
Juvenile Meloidogyne penetrating a host plant

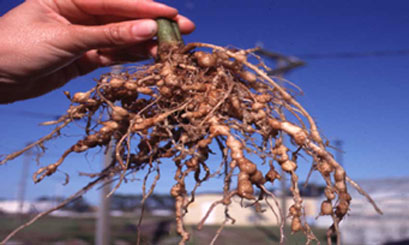
Root-knot galls caused by the nematode Meloidogyne

=== Fungi ===
Many rust fungi induce gall formation, including western gall rust, which infects a variety of pine trees, and cedar-apple rust. Galls are often seen in Millettia pinnata leaves and fruits. Leaf galls appear like tiny clubs; however, flower galls are globose. Exobasidium often induces spectacular galls on its hosts.

The fungus Ustilago esculenta associated with Zizania latifolia, a wild rice, produces an edible gall highly valued as a food source in the Zhejiang and Jiangsu provinces of China.

Fungal galls

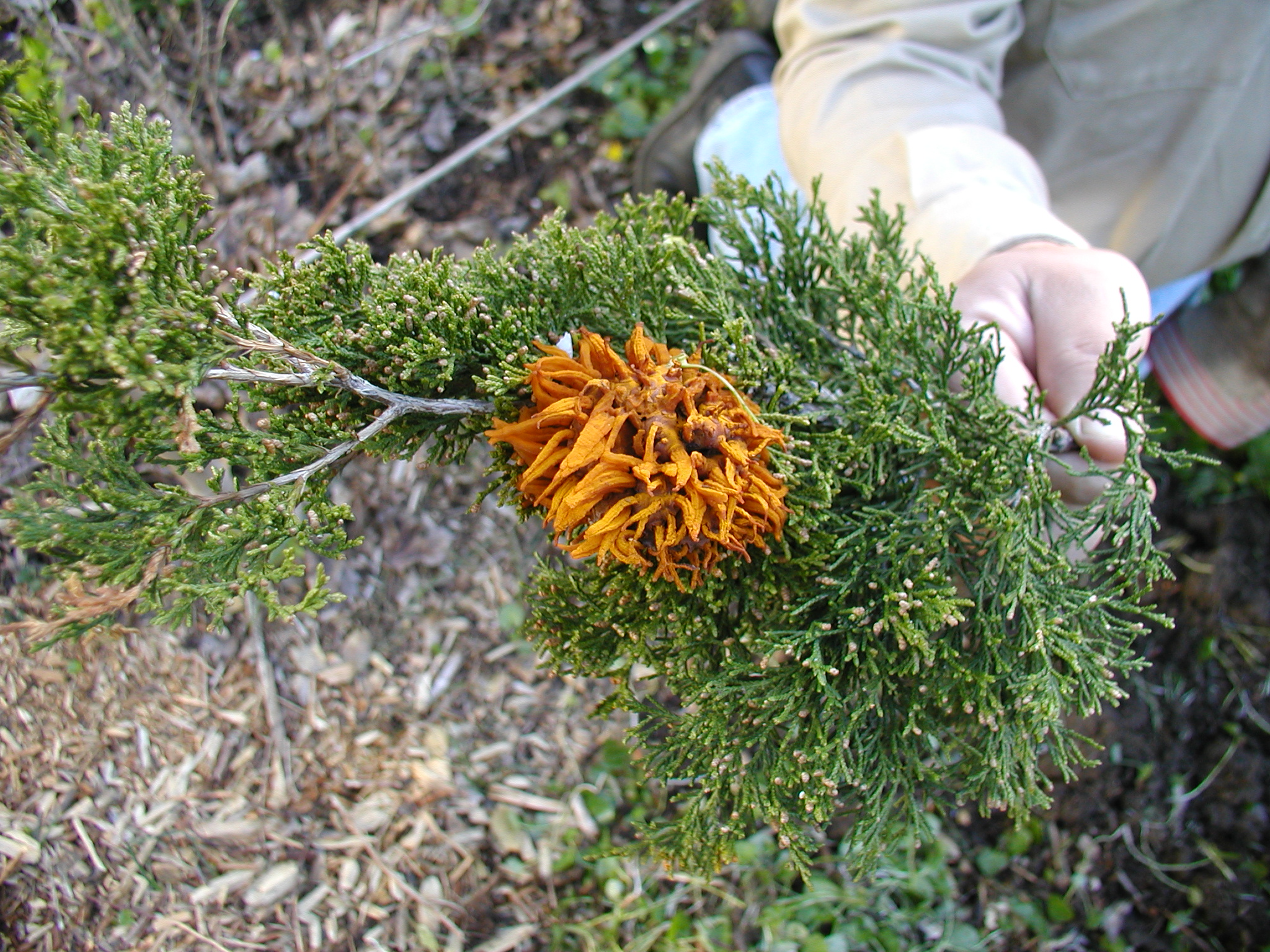
Gall on conifer Juniperus virginiana caused by Gymnosporangium (Pucciniales)

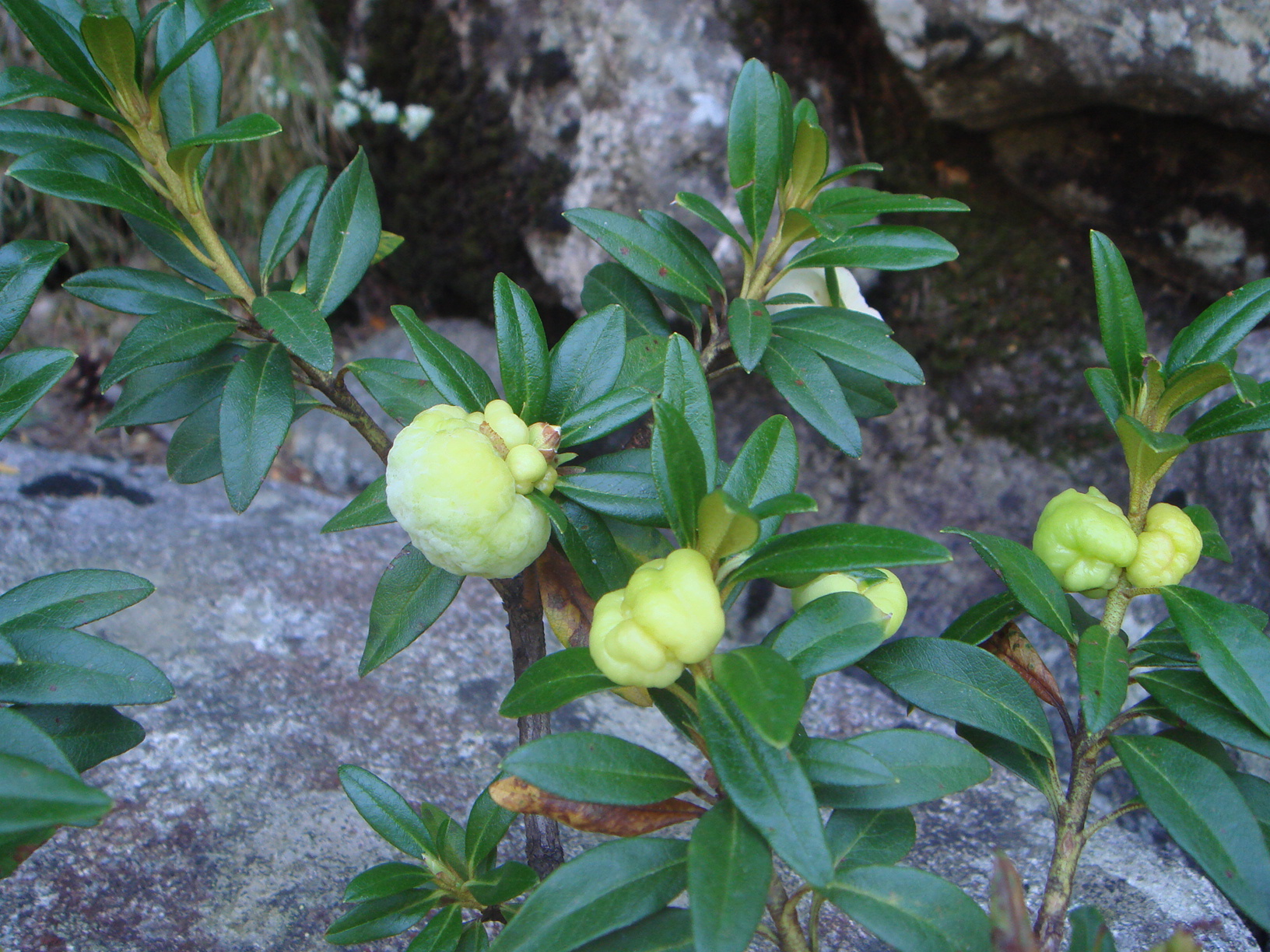
Leaf galls on Rhododendron ferrugineum caused by fungus Exobasidium rhododendri

=== Bacteria and viruses ===
Gall-causing bacteria include Agrobacterium tumefaciens and Pseudomonas savastanoi.

Gall forming virus was found on rice plants in central Thailand in 1979 and named rice gall dwarf. Symptoms consisted of gall formation along leaf blades and sheaths, dark green discoloration, twisted leaf tips, and reduced numbers of tillers. Some plants died in the glasshouse in the later stages of infection. The causal agent was transmitted by the hemipteran bug Nephotettix nigropictus after an incubation of two weeks. Polyhedral particles of 65 nm diameter in the cytoplasm of phloem cells were always associated with the disease. No serologic relationship was found between this virus and that of rice dwarf.

Microbial pathogen galls

Crown gall on Kalanchoe infected with Agrobacterium tumefaciens

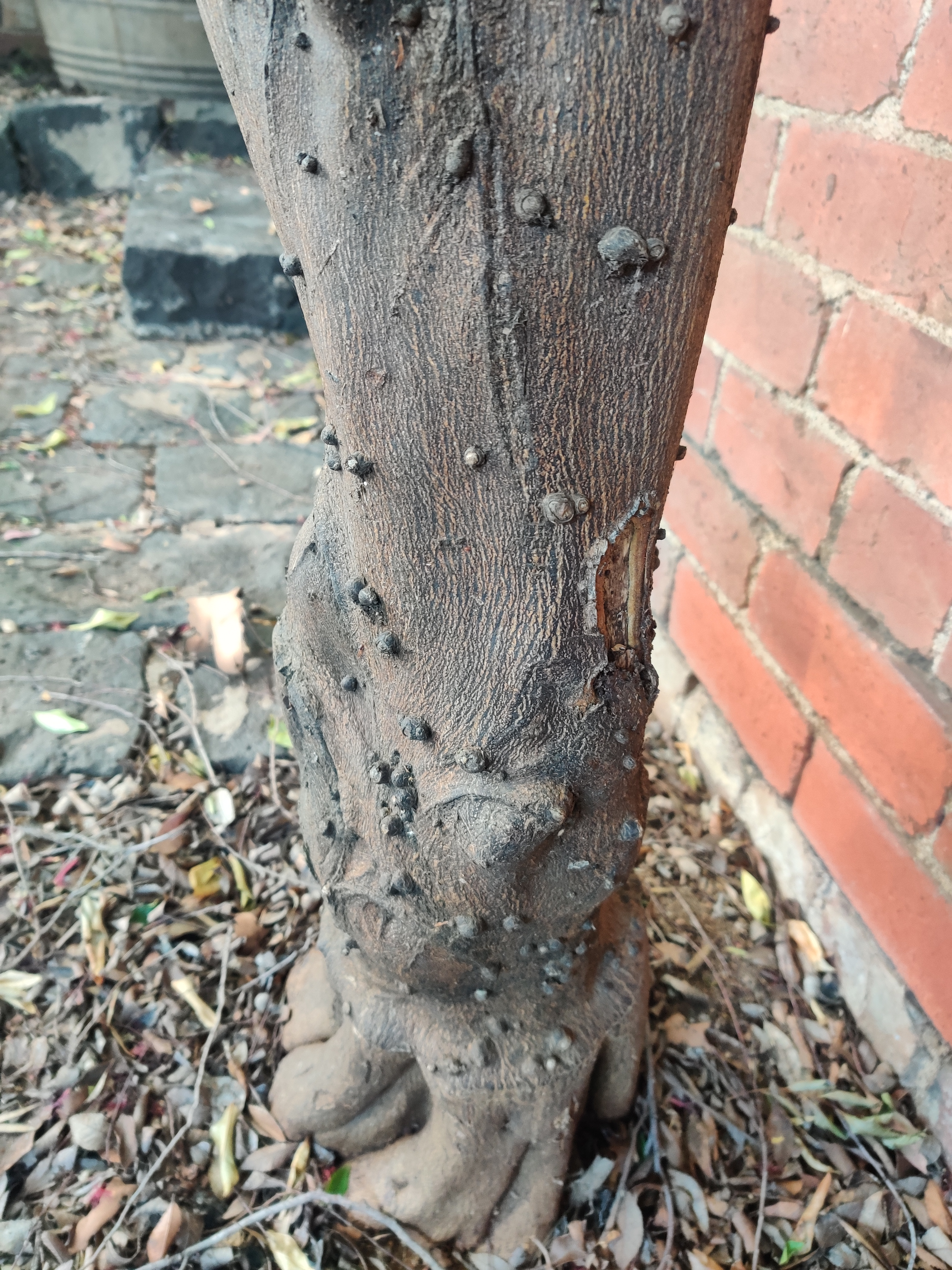
Citrus vein enation woody gall on Fortunella japonica caused by a pathogen with an aphid vector

=== Plants ===
The hemiparasitic plant mistletoe forms woody structures sometimes called galls on its hosts. More complex interactions are possible; the parasitic plant Cassytha filiformis sometimes preferentially feeds on galls induced by the cynipid wasp Belonocnema treatae.

== Uses ==
Galls are rich in resins and tannic acid and have been used widely in the manufacturing of permanent inks (such as iron gall ink) and astringent ointments, in dyeing, and in leather tanning. The Talmud records using gallnuts as part of the tanning process as well as a dye-base for ink.

Medieval Arabic literature records many uses for the gall, called عفص ˁafṣ in Arabic. The Aleppo gall, found on oak trees in northern Syria, was among the most important exports from Syria during this period, with one merchant recording a shipment of galls from Suwaydiyya near Antioch fetching the high price of 4½ dinars per 100 pounds. The primary use of the galls was as a mordant for black dyes; they were also used to make a high-quality ink. The gall was also used as a medication to treat fever and intestinal ailments.

== See also ==
- British Plant Gall Society
- Forest pathology
- List of insect galls

Similar structures (not galls):

- Burl
- Witch's broom
