= Japanagromyza duchesneae =

Scientific classification
- Kingdom: Animalia
- Phylum: Arthropoda
- Class: Insecta
- Order: Diptera
- Family: Agromyzidae
- Subfamily: Agromyzinae
- Genus: Japanagromyza
- Species: J. duchesneae

Binomial name
- Japanagromyza duchesneae (Sasakawa, 1954)

Synonyms
- Agromyza duchesneae Sasakawa, 1954

Species of fly

Japanagromyza duchesneae is a species of fly in the family Agromyzidae.

== Distribution ==
Japan, Papua New Guinea, Vanuatu.
