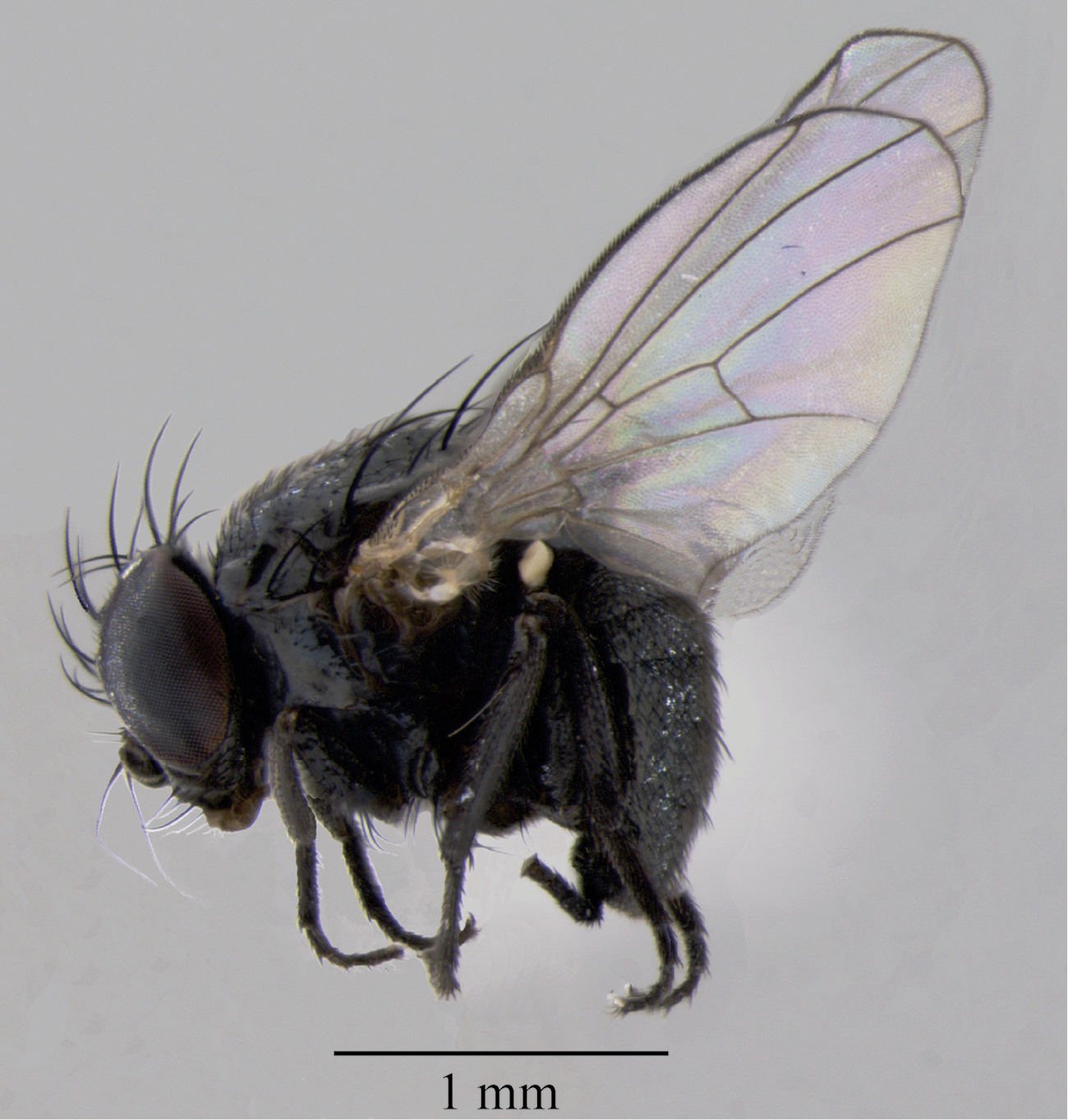
- Japanagromyza inferna Spencer, male, in lateral view.

Scientific classification
- Kingdom: Animalia
- Phylum: Arthropoda
- Class: Insecta
- Order: Diptera
- Family: Agromyzidae
- Subfamily: Agromyzinae
- Genus: Japanagromyza
- Species: J. inferna

Binomial name
- Japanagromyza inferna Spencer, 1973

= Japanagromyza inferna =

Species of fly

Japanagromyza inferna is a species of fly in the family Agromyzidae.

== Distribution ==
Bahamas.
