= Japanagromyza tristella =

Scientific classification
- Kingdom: Animalia
- Phylum: Arthropoda
- Class: Insecta
- Order: Diptera
- Family: Agromyzidae
- Subfamily: Agromyzinae
- Genus: Japanagromyza
- Species: J. tristella

Binomial name
- Japanagromyza tristella (Thomson, 1869)

Synonyms
- Agromyza koshunensis Malloch, 1914; Agromyza tristella Thomson, 1869; Agromyza variihalterata Malloch, 1914; Japanagromyza indica Ipe, 1971; Japanagromyza nawai Kato, 1961; Japanagromyza trispina Spencer, 1965

Species of fly

Japanagromyza tristella is a species of fly in the family Agromyzidae.

== Distribution ==
Sri Lanka, China, Taiwan, India, Java, Malaysia, Nepal, Vietnam, Japan, Manus, New Ireland.
