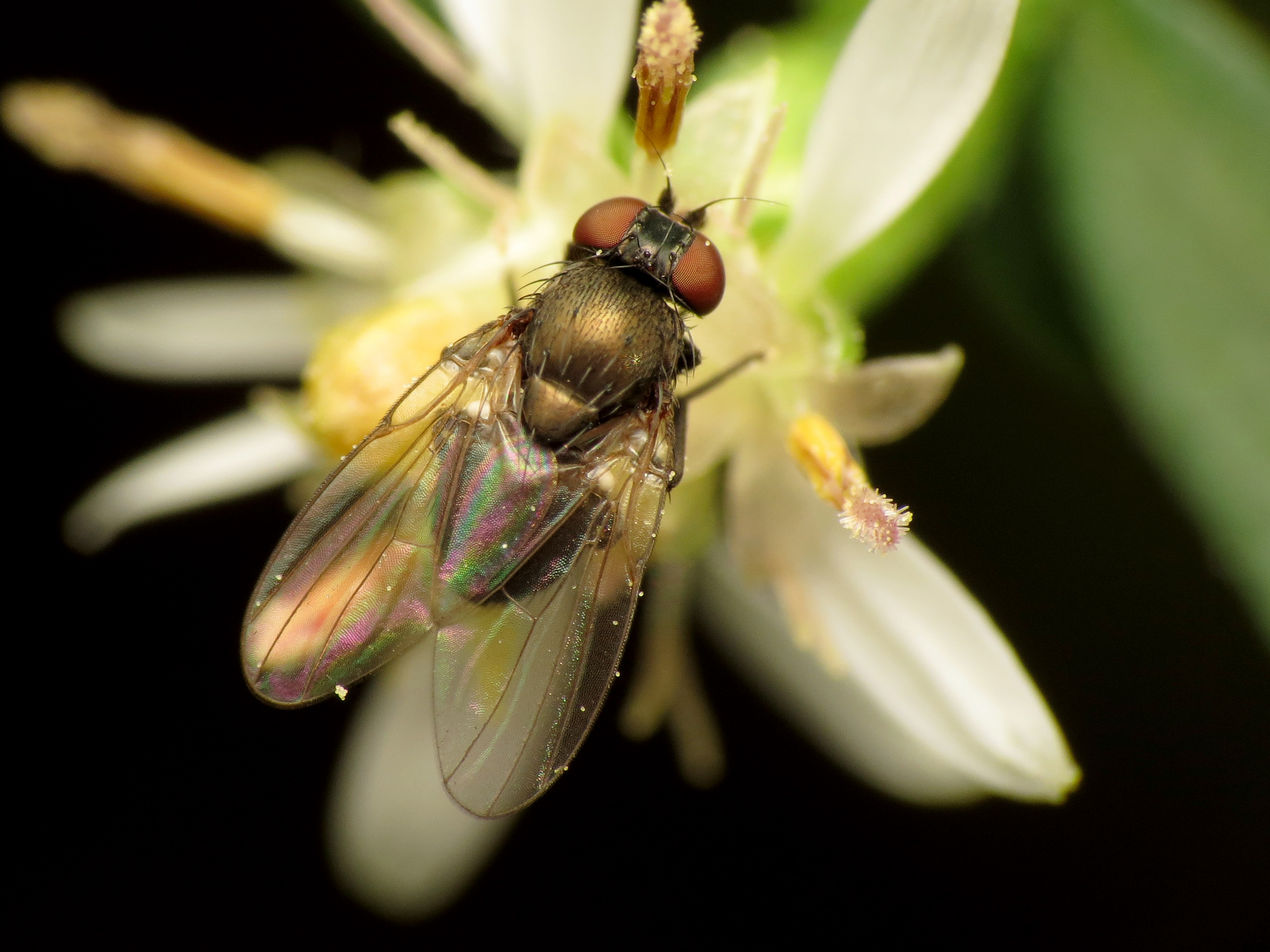

Scientific classification
- Kingdom: Animalia
- Phylum: Arthropoda
- Class: Insecta
- Order: Diptera
- Family: Agromyzidae
- Subfamily: Agromyzinae
- Genus: Japanagromyza
- Species: J. viridula

Binomial name
- Japanagromyza viridula (Coquillett, 1902)

Synonyms
- Agromyza viridula Coquillett, 1902

= Japanagromyza viridula =

Species of fly

Japanagromyza viridula, the oak shothole leafminer, is a species of fly in the family Agromyzidae.

== Distribution ==
Canada, United States.
