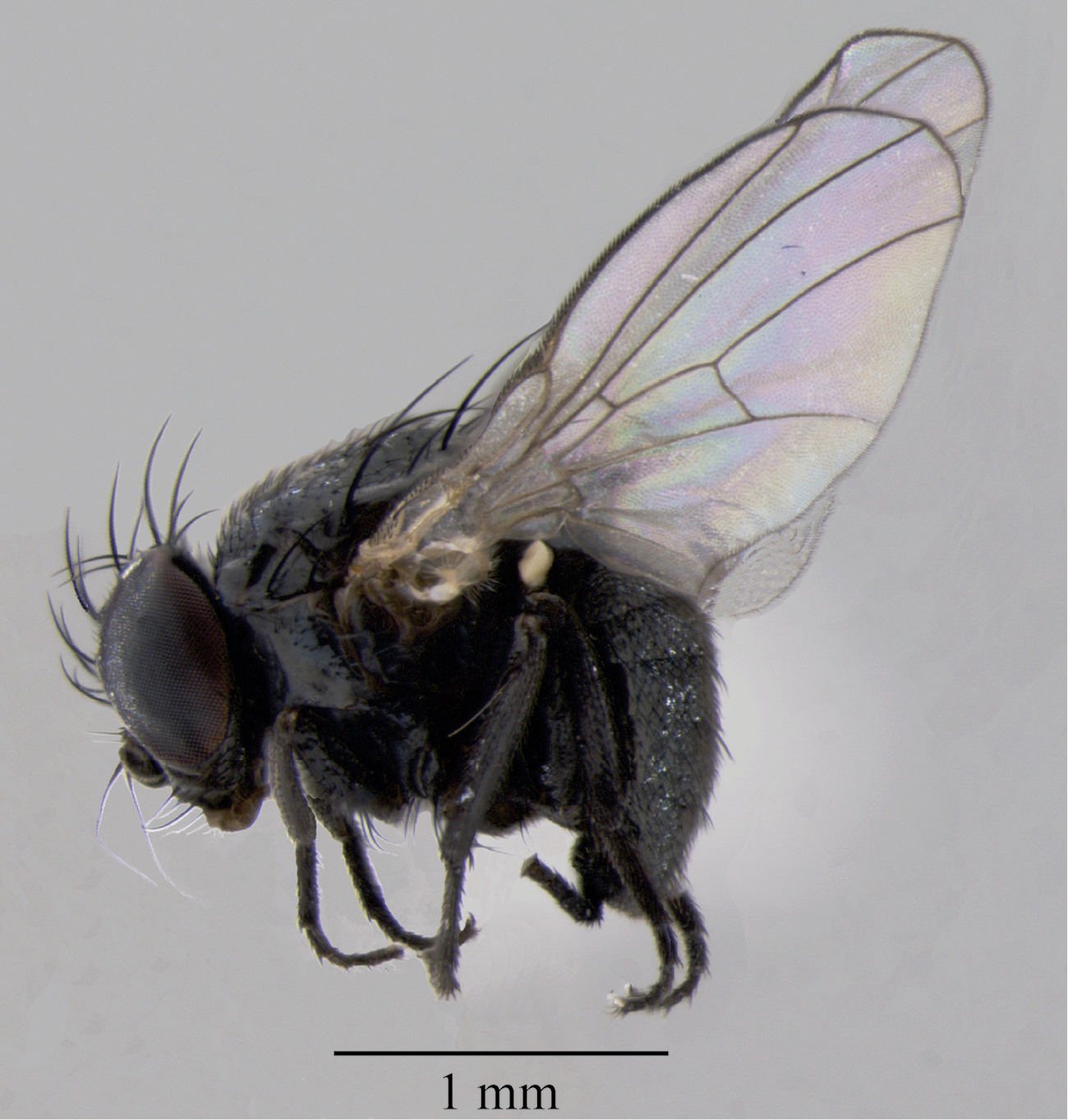
- Japanagromyza inferna Spencer, male, in lateral view.

Scientific classification
- Kingdom: Animalia
- Phylum: Arthropoda
- Class: Insecta
- Order: Diptera
- Family: Agromyzidae
- Subfamily: Agromyzinae
- Genus: Japanagromyza; Sasakawa, 1958

Type species
- Agromyza duchesneae Sasakawa, 1954

Synonyms
- Geratomyza Spencer, 1973

= Japanagromyza =

Genus of flies

Japanagromyza is a genus of flies in the family Agromyzidae.

== Species ==
- Japanagromyza aequalis Spencer, 1966
- Japanagromyza aldrichi Frick, 1952
- Japanagromyza ambigua Sasakawa, 1992
- Japanagromyza angulosa Sasakawa, 2005
- Japanagromyza approximata (Frost, 1936)
- Japanagromyza arcuaria Sousa & Couri, 2017
- Japanagromyza argentata Gu, Fan & Sasakawa, 1991
- Japanagromyza arnaudi Sasakawa, 1963
- Japanagromyza beata Korytkowski, 2014
- Japanagromyza bennetti Spencer, 1973
- Japanagromyza brooksi Spencer, 1969
- Japanagromyza browni Sasakawa, 2010
- Japanagromyza centrosemae (Frost, 1936)
- Japanagromyza centrosematifolii Etienne & Martinez, 2002
- Japanagromyza cercariae Sasakawa, 1963
- Japanagromyza cestra Sasakawa, 2010
- Japanagromyza chapadensis Sousa & Couri, 2017
- Japanagromyza clausa Sasakawa, 1992
- Japanagromyza cupreata Sasakawa, 1963
- Japanagromyza currani (Frost, 1936)
- Japanagromyza delecta Spencer, 1962
- Japanagromyza desmodivora Spencer, 1966
- Japanagromyza displicata Sasakawa, 1963
- Japanagromyza duchesneae (Sasakawa, 1954)
- Japanagromyza elaeagni (Sasakawa, 1954)
- Japanagromyza etiennei Martinez, 1994
- Japanagromyza eucalypti Spencer, 1962
- Japanagromyza fortis Spencer, 1977
- Japanagromyza howensis Spencer, 1977
- Japanagromyza hymenoedemia Sasakawa, 2010
- Japanagromyza inaequalis (Malloch, 1914)
- Japanagromyza incisa Sasakawa, 1963
- Japanagromyza inferna Spencer, 1973
- Japanagromyza insularum Spencer, 1963
- Japanagromyza intricata Sasakawa, 2010
- Japanagromyza involuta Spencer, 1977
- Japanagromyza jamaicensis Spencer, 1963
- Japanagromyza kalshoveni (Meijere, 1934)
- Japanagromyza kammuriensis (Sasakawa, 1954)
- Japanagromyza laosica Sasakawa, 2009
- Japanagromyza lonchocarpi Boucher, 2006
- Japanagromyza loranthi Spencer, 1966
- Japanagromyza macroptilivora Esposito & Prado, 1993
- Japanagromyza maculata (Spencer, 1973)
- Japanagromyza meridiana Spencer, 1961
- Japanagromyza multiplicata Sasakawa, 1963
- Japanagromyza nebulifera Sasakawa, 2005
- Japanagromyza nigrihalterata (Spencer, 1959)
- Japanagromyza orbitalis (Frost, 1936)
- Japanagromyza paganensis Spencer, 1963
- Japanagromyza parvula Spencer, 1961
- Japanagromyza perpetua Spencer, 1973
- Japanagromyza perplexa Spencer, 1975
- Japanagromyza peruana Korytkowski, 2014
- Japanagromyza phaseoli Spencer, 1983
- Japanagromyza philippinensis Sasakawa, 1996
- Japanagromyza polygoni Spencer, 1971
- Japanagromyza propinqua Spencer, 1973
- Japanagromyza quercus (Sasakawa, 1954)
- Japanagromyza rutiliceps (Melander, 1913)
- Japanagromyza salicifolii (Collin, 1911)
- Japanagromyza sasakawai Monteiro, Carvalho-Filho & Esposito, 2015
- Japanagromyza scelesta Spencer, 1966
- Japanagromyza setigera (Malloch, 1914)
- Japanagromyza sikandraensis (Garg, 1971)
- Japanagromyza sordidata (Spencer, 1962)
- Japanagromyza spadix (Spencer, 1963)
- Japanagromyza stylata Sasakawa, 1963
- Japanagromyza teestae Singh & Ipe, 1973
- Japanagromyza tephrosiae Meijere, 1917
- Japanagromyza tingomariensis Sasakawa, 1992
- Japanagromyza tokunagai (Sasakawa, 1953)
- Japanagromyza trientis Spencer, 1962
- Japanagromyza trifida Spencer, 1962
- Japanagromyza triformis Spencer, 1962
- Japanagromyza tristella (Thomson, 1869)
- Japanagromyza vanchei Singh & Ipe, 1973
- Japanagromyza viridula (Coquillett, 1902)
- Japanagromyza wirthi Spencer, 1973
- Japanagromyza yanoi (Sasakawa, 1955)
- Japanagromyza yoshimotoi Sasakawa, 1963
