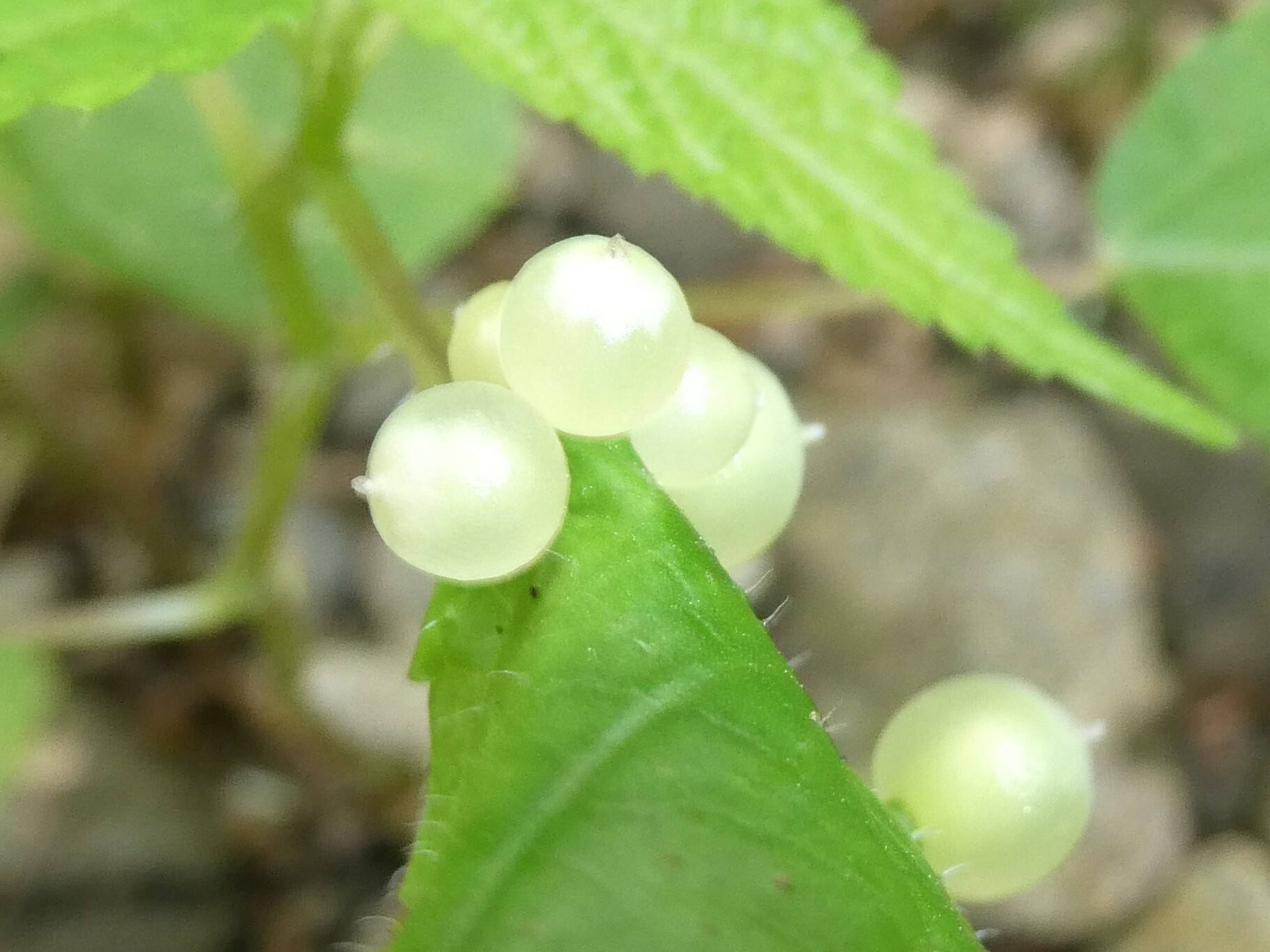
- Dasineura investita galls

Scientific classification
- Kingdom: Animalia
- Phylum: Arthropoda
- Class: Insecta
- Order: Diptera
- Family: Cecidomyiidae
- Genus: Dasineura
- Species: D. investita

Binomial name
- Dasineura investita Plakidas, 2016

= Dasineura investita =

Species of fly

Dasineura investita, the wood nettle gall midge, forms a gall that grows on the wood nettle plant Laportea canadensis. It was described in 2016 and is caused by a midge in the family Cecidomyiidae. The galls form on the petiole, upper leaf, leaf midrib, on leaf veins, between leaf veins, flower, stem. They are oval globose 4-5 mm by 8-12 mm pale, red, white, to green translucent. There are two generations a year, the full grown larva from the autumn generation overwinters in the central chamber of the gall. The genus Dasineura is a vary large one with many gall forming species.
