= Dwarf goldenrod =

Dwarf goldenrod is a common name for several plants and may refer to:

- Solidago nana
- Solidago nemoralis, native to North America
- Solidago sphacelata, native to the eastern United States
