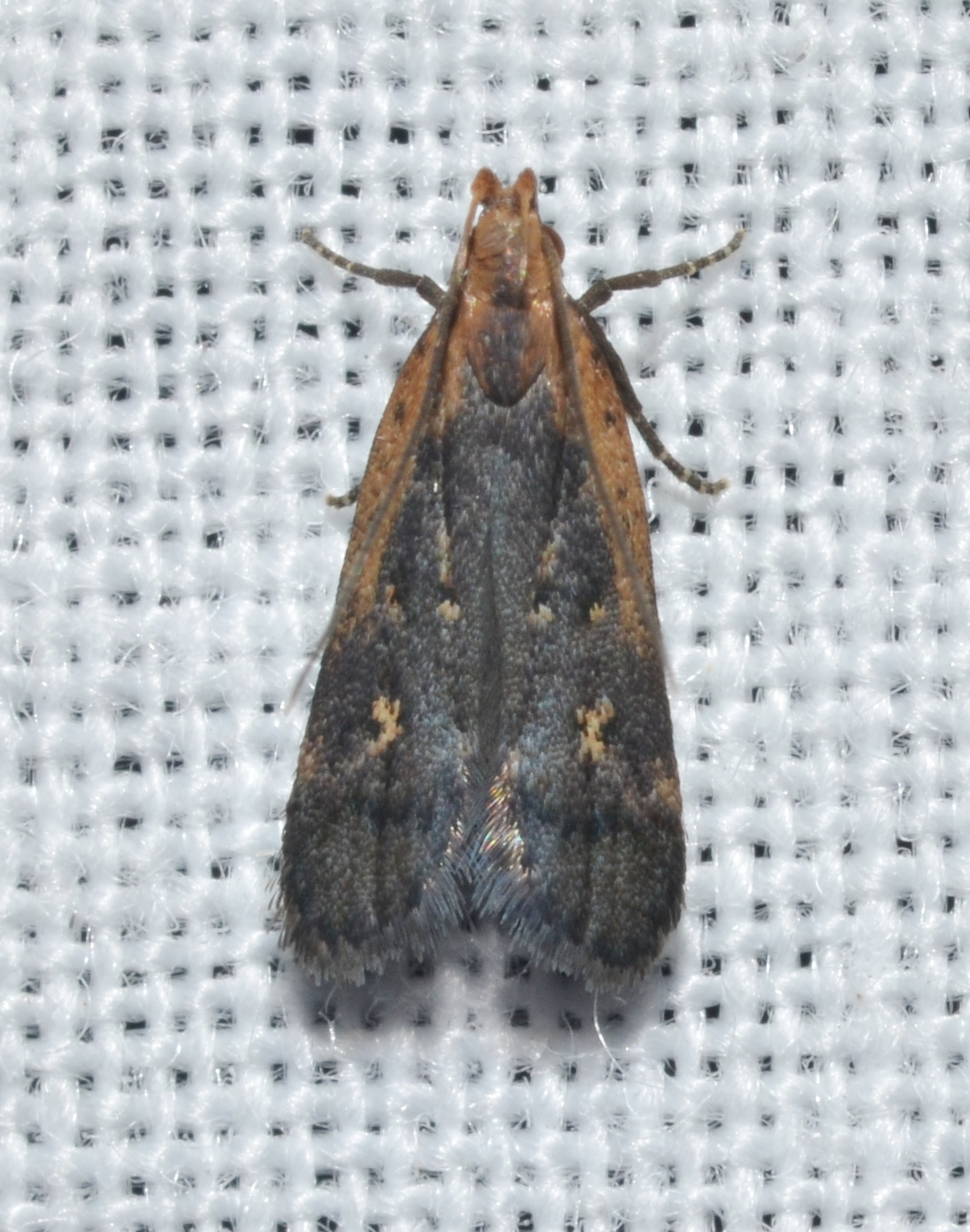

Scientific classification
- Kingdom: Animalia
- Phylum: Arthropoda
- Clade: Pancrustacea
- Class: Insecta
- Order: Lepidoptera
- Family: Gelechiidae
- Genus: Dichomeris
- Species: D. copa

Binomial name
- Dichomeris copa Hodges, 1986

= Dichomeris copa =

Copa dichomeris moth

Species of moth

Dichomeris copa, the copa dichomeris moth, is a moth of the family Gelechiidae. It was described by Ronald W. Hodges in 1986. It is found in North America, where it has been recorded from Wyoming east to southern Ontario and Vermont, south to southern Illinois and Maryland.

The wingspan is about 15 mm. Adults are on wing from June to September.

The larvae feed on Solidago species.

== Etymology ==
The species name is derived from Latin copa (meaning dancing girl).
