= Solidago kralii =

Conservation status
- Imperiled (NatureServe)

Scientific classification
- Kingdom: Plantae
- Clade: Tracheophytes
- Clade: Angiosperms
- Clade: Eudicots
- Clade: Asterids
- Order: Asterales
- Family: Asteraceae
- Genus: Solidago
- Species: S. kralii

Binomial name
- Solidago kralii Semple

Species of plant

Solidago kralii, common name Kral's goldenrod, is a North American plant species first described as a new species in 2003. It is found on sandy hills in oak-pine woodlands of Georgia and South Carolina.

Solidago kralii is an herb up to 110 cm (44 inches) tall, with dense resin hairs on the leaves. One plant can produce as many as 200 small yellow flower heads.

The species is named for American botanist Robert Kral.
