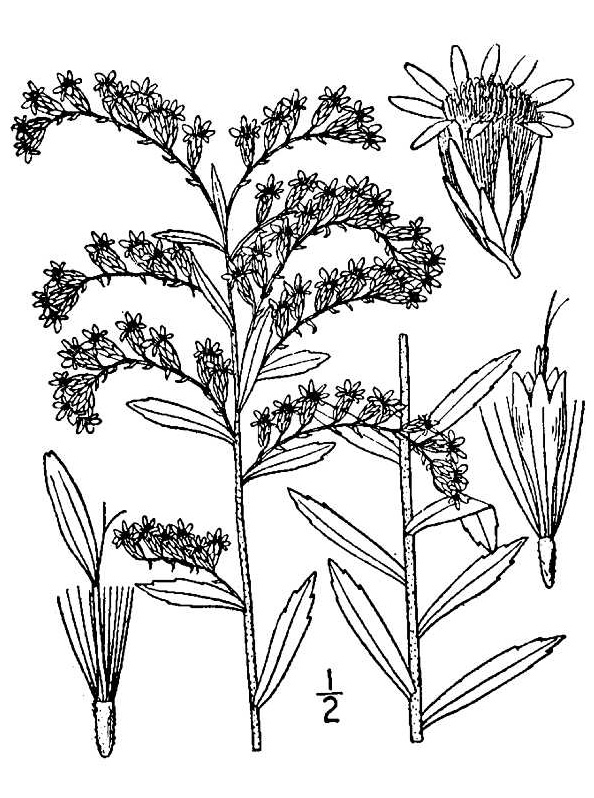
- 1913 illustration

Scientific classification
- Kingdom: Plantae
- Clade: Tracheophytes
- Clade: Angiosperms
- Clade: Eudicots
- Clade: Asterids
- Order: Asterales
- Family: Asteraceae
- Genus: Solidago
- Species: S. tortifolia

Binomial name
- Solidago tortifolia Elliott

Synonyms
- Aster purschianus Kuntze

= Solidago tortifolia =

Species of flowering plant

Solidago tortifolia, commonly known as twistleaf goldenrod, is a North American species of goldenrod in the family Asteraceae. It is found in the eastern and southern United States, primarily along the Atlantic and Gulf coastal plain from Maryland to Texas.

Solidago tortifolia is a perennial herb up to 130 cm (52 inches or 4 1/3 feet) tall, with a woody underground caudex or rhizomes. One plant can produce as many as 300 small yellow flower heads in a large, branching array at the top of the plant.

S. tortifolia can be found in habitats such as pine flatwoods, sand pine scrub, and various types of hardwood hammocks.
