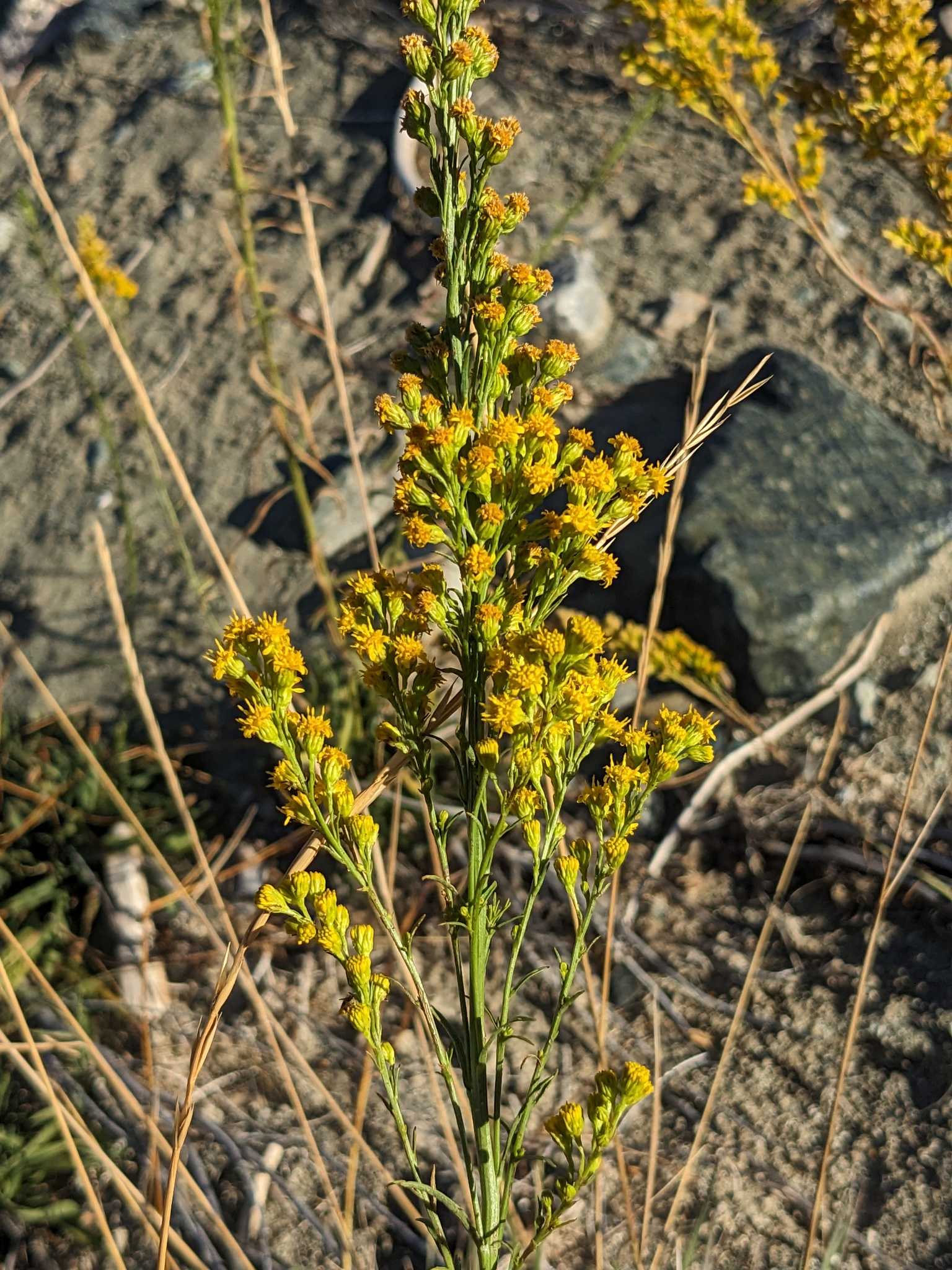

Scientific classification
- Kingdom: Plantae
- Clade: Tracheophytes
- Clade: Angiosperms
- Clade: Eudicots
- Clade: Asterids
- Order: Asterales
- Family: Asteraceae
- Genus: Solidago
- Species: S. guiradonis

Binomial name
- Solidago guiradonis A.Gray

Synonyms
- Aster guiradonis (A.Gray) Kuntze

= Solidago guiradonis =

Species of flowering plant

Solidago guiradonis is an uncommon species of goldenrod known by the common name Guirado goldenrod. It is native to the Central California Coast Ranges of central California, in southern San Benito and western Fresno Counties.

The species is a strict serpentine endemic with a range that includes the New Idria Serpentine Mass and Laguna Mountain Serpentine Mass. It is an obligate wetland species that occurs on the banks of perennial streams and rivers and also perennial seeps on the New Idria Serpentine Mass and Laguna Mountain Serpentine Mass.

== Description ==
Solidago guiradonis is a perennial herb growing from a woody caudex, sometimes reaching heights well over one meter (40 inches). The leaves are up to 20 centimeters (8 inches) long near the base of the plant, but shorter higher up. They are linear to lance-shaped and have winged petioles that expand to nearly sheath the stem at the bases. The herbage is mostly hairless.

The inflorescence is a cluster of sometimes as many as 190 small flower heads in a branching, elongated array. Each flower head contains 10-21 yellow disc florets surrounded by up to 8-10 narrow yellow ray florets that are 1 or 2 millimeters long.
