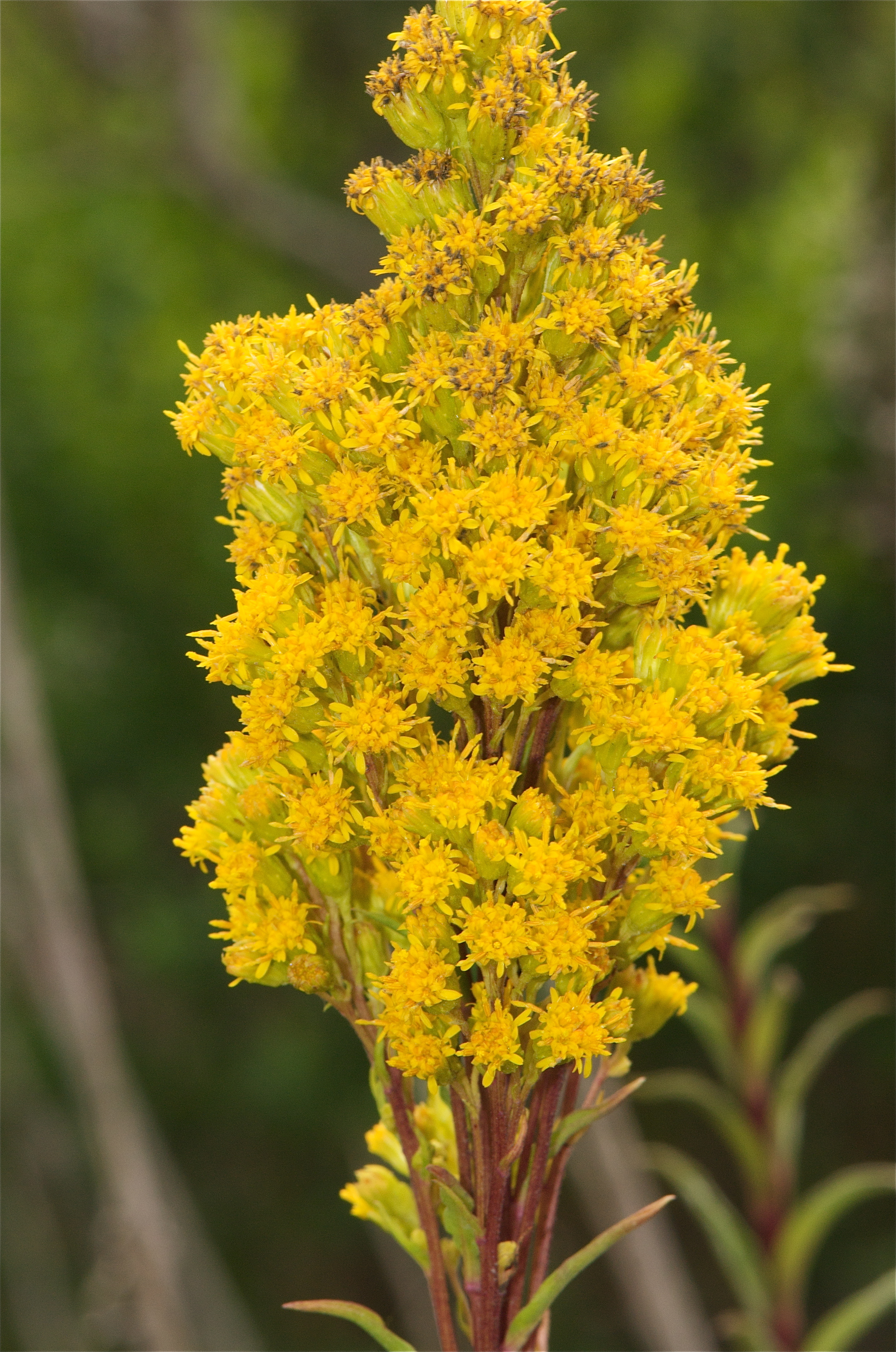

Scientific classification
- Kingdom: Plantae
- Clade: Tracheophytes
- Clade: Angiosperms
- Clade: Eudicots
- Clade: Asterids
- Order: Asterales
- Family: Asteraceae
- Genus: Solidago
- Species: S. confinis

Binomial name
- Solidago confinis A.Gray 1882

Synonyms
- Aster confinis (A.Gray) Kuntze; Solidago spectabilis var. confinis (A.Gray) Cronquist

= Solidago confinis =

Species of flowering plant

Solidago confinis, commonly called southern goldenrod, is a North American species of flowering plants in the family Asteraceae. It is native to California, southern Nevada, and Baja California.

Solidago confinis is a perennial herb sometimes as much as 200 cm (80 inches) tall, with a thick, woody underground caudex. One plant can produce up to 320 small yellow flower heads in a showy, branching array at the top of the stem.
