= Solidago orientalis =

Scientific classification
- Kingdom: Plantae
- Clade: Tracheophytes
- Clade: Angiosperms
- Clade: Eudicots
- Clade: Asterids
- Order: Asterales
- Family: Asteraceae
- Genus: Solidago
- Species: S. orientalis

Binomial name
- Solidago orientalis (G.L.Nesom) G.L.Nesom 1990

Synonyms
- Solidago wrightii var. orientalis G.L.Nesom 1989

Species of flowering plant

Solidago orientalis is a rare plant species native to Mexico. The species has been found in the states of Coahuila and Nuevo León in northeastern Mexico.

Solidago orientalis is a perennial herb up to 60 cm (2 fee4t) tall. The leaves are thick, elliptical, up to 7.5 cm (3 inches) long. One plant can produce many small yellow flower heads in a compact branching array at the top of the plant.
