= Solidago gypsophila =

Scientific classification
- Kingdom: Plantae
- Clade: Tracheophytes
- Clade: Angiosperms
- Clade: Eudicots
- Clade: Asterids
- Order: Asterales
- Family: Asteraceae
- Genus: Solidago
- Species: S. gypsophila

Binomial name
- Solidago gypsophila G.L.Nesom

Species of flowering plant

Solidago gypsophila is rare Mexican species of flowering plants in the family Asteraceae. It has been found in the state of Coahuila in northeastern Mexico.

Solidago gypsophila is a perennial herb up to 200 cm (80 inches) tall. Leaves are crowded together and generally originated vertically rather than horizontally, up to 7.5 cm (3 inches) long. Flower heads are yellow, in a large, branching, conical array at the tops of the stems.
