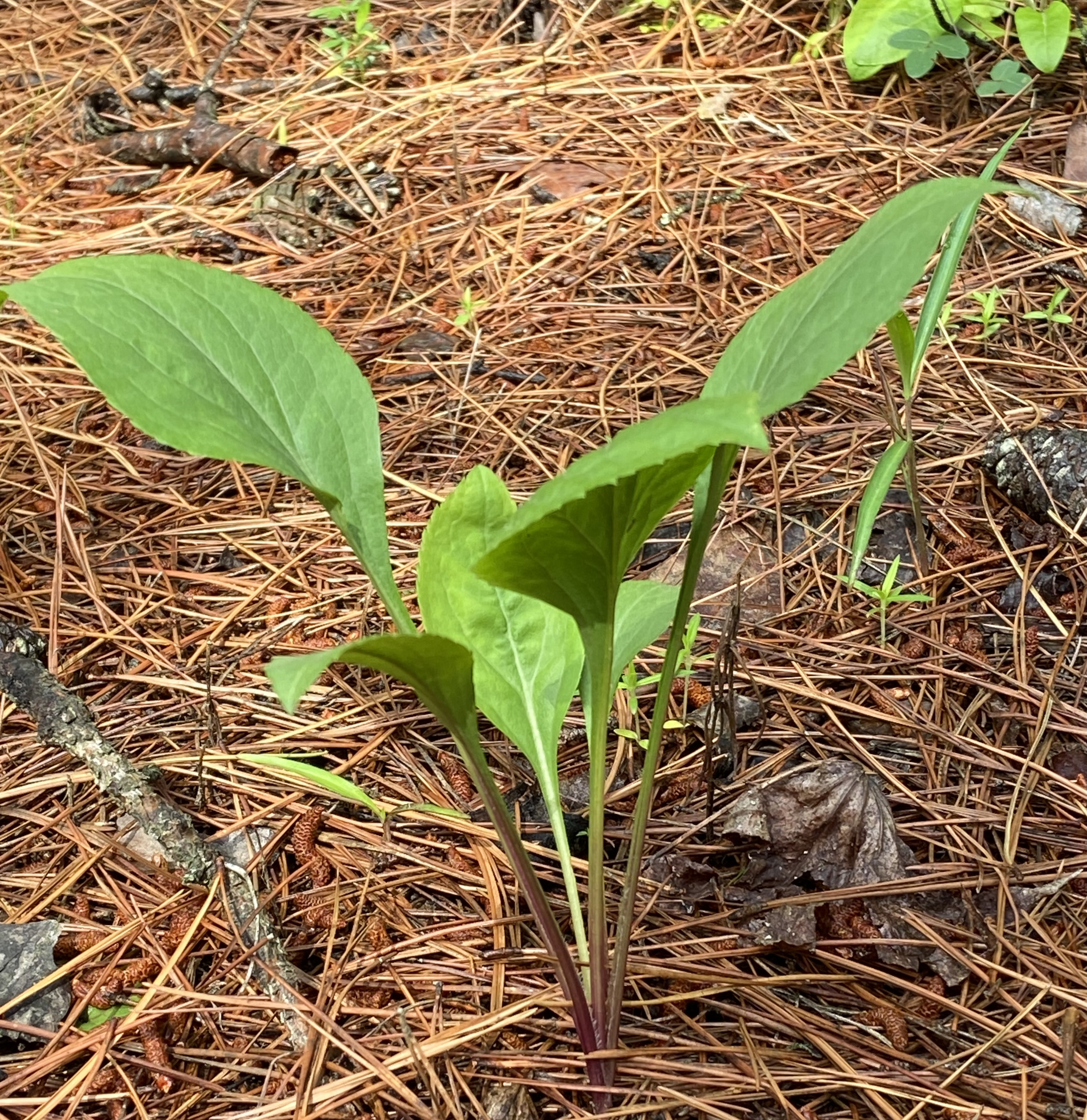

Scientific classification
- Kingdom: Plantae
- Clade: Tracheophytes
- Clade: Angiosperms
- Clade: Eudicots
- Clade: Asterids
- Order: Asterales
- Family: Asteraceae
- Genus: Solidago
- Species: S. ludoviciana

Binomial name
- Solidago ludoviciana (A.Gray) Small

Synonyms
- Solidago boottii Hooker var. ludoviciana A. Gray 1882; Solidago arguta Aiton var. strigosa (Small) Steyermark; Solidago strigosa Small

= Solidago ludoviciana =

Species of flowering plant

Solidago ludoviciana, the Louisiana goldenrod, is a North American plant species in the family Asteraceae native to Louisiana, Texas and Arkansas. It can be found in dry open woods and along roadsides and other sunny, disturbed locations.

Solidago ludoviciana can be as tall as 150 cm (5 feet). It has round to elliptic leaves and open panicles of yellow flower heads. One plant can produce as many as 140 small heads
