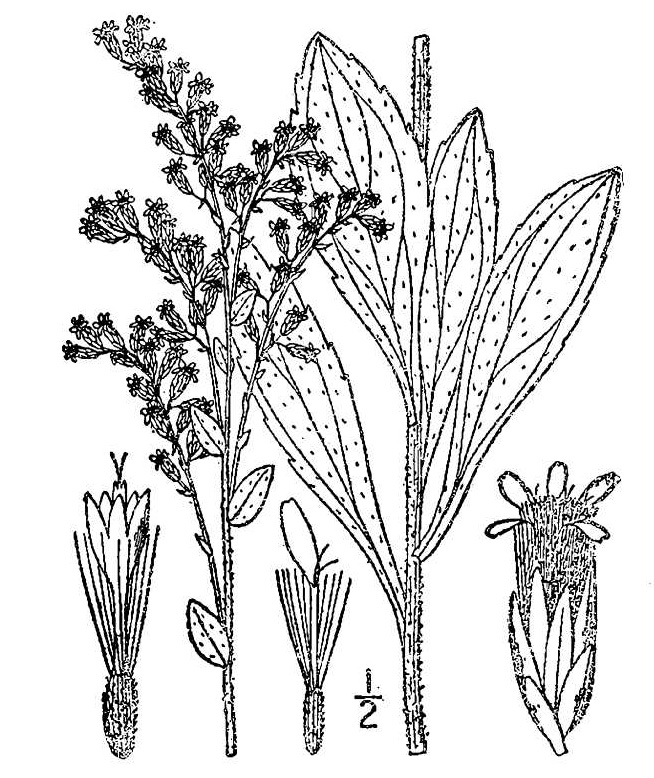
- 1913 illustration

Scientific classification
- Kingdom: Plantae
- Clade: Tracheophytes
- Clade: Angiosperms
- Clade: Eudicots
- Clade: Asterids
- Order: Asterales
- Family: Asteraceae
- Genus: Solidago
- Species: S. radula

Binomial name
- Solidago radula Nutt. 1834

Synonyms
- Synonymy: Aster decemflora Nutt.; Aster decemflorus Kuntze; Solidago decemflora A.Gray 1850 not DC. 1836; Solidago laeta Greene; Solidago pendula Small; Solidago rotundifolia DC.; Solidago scaberrima Torr. & A.Gray

= Solidago radula =

Species of flowering plant

Solidago radula, the western rough goldenrod, is a North American plant species in the family Asteraceae. It is mainly found in the southern Great Plains and the Mississippi Valley of the United States (from Texas to Illinois), with isolated populations further east in Kentucky, Georgia, and the Carolinas.

Solidago radula is a perennial herb up to 90 cm (3 feet) tall, with a caudex and rhizomes. Lower leaves can be up to 10 cm (4 inches) long, leaves higher on the stem much smaller. One plant can produce as many as 260 small yellow flower heads in a branching array. The species grows in open rocky places and in dry woodlands.
