= Solidago pringlei =

Scientific classification
- Kingdom: Plantae
- Clade: Tracheophytes
- Clade: Angiosperms
- Clade: Eudicots
- Clade: Asterids
- Order: Asterales
- Family: Asteraceae
- Genus: Solidago
- Species: S. pringlei

Binomial name
- Solidago pringlei Fernald

Species of flowering plant

Solidago pringlei is a Mexican species of goldenrod in the family Asteraceae. It has been found only in the state of Nuevo León in northeastern Mexico.

Solidago pringlei is a perennial herb up to 30 cm (12 inches) tall. The stem is crowded with many long-narrow leaves up to 13 cm (8.4 inches) long. The plant produces numerous small, yellow flower heads in an array at the top of the plant (the array sometimes branching, sometimes long and narrow.
