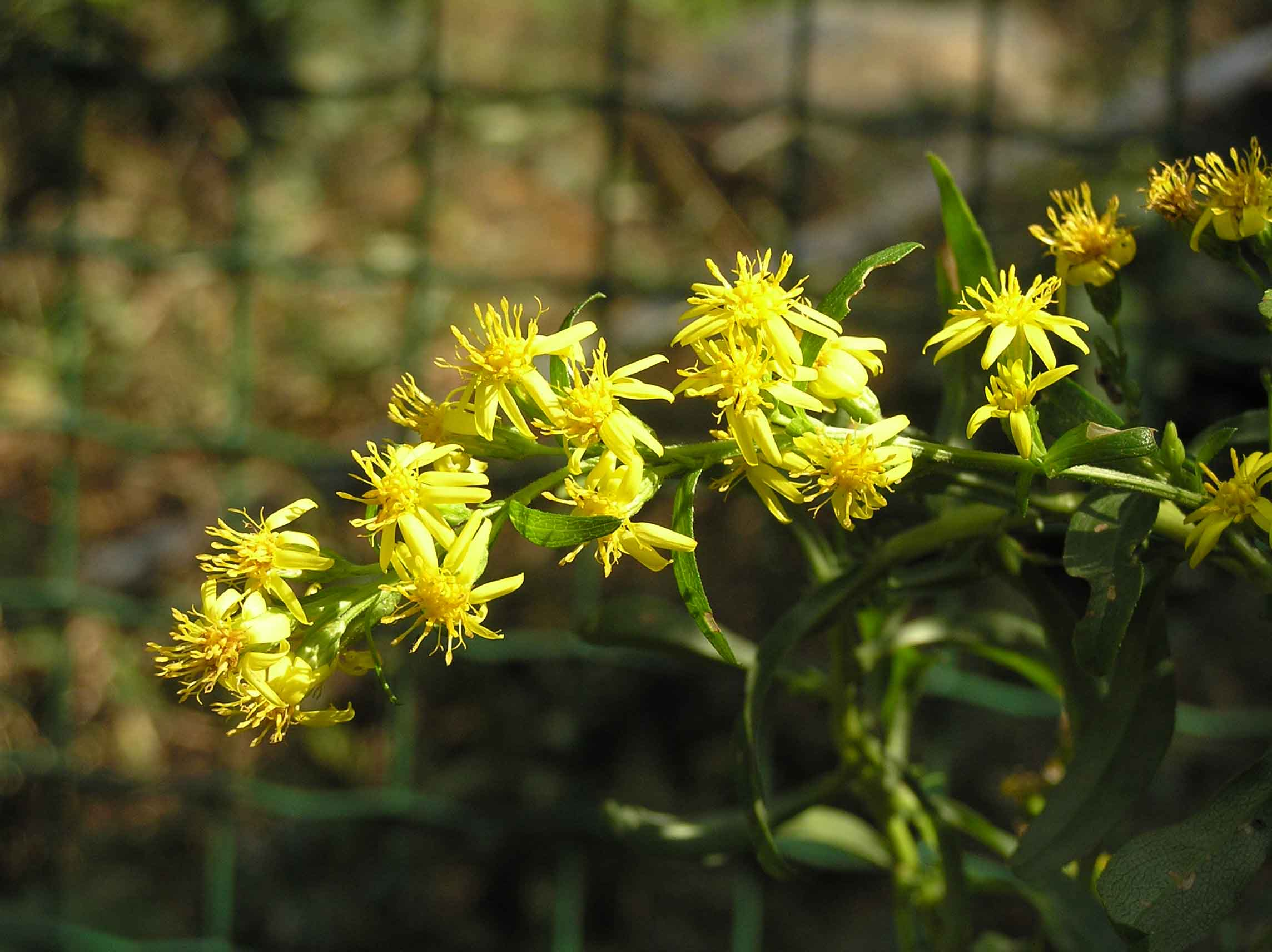

Scientific classification
- Kingdom: Plantae
- Clade: Tracheophytes
- Clade: Angiosperms
- Clade: Eudicots
- Clade: Asterids
- Order: Asterales
- Family: Asteraceae
- Genus: Solidago
- Species: S. decurrens

Binomial name
- Solidago decurrens Lour. 1790

Synonyms
- Amphirhapis chinensis Sch.Bip.; Amphirhapis leiocarpa Benth.; Solidago pacifica Juz.; Solidago pubescens Wall.

= Solidago decurrens =

Species of flowering plant

Solidago decurrens is an Asian species of flowering plants in the family Asteraceae. It is widespread across China, India, Korea, Japan, Indochina, Nepal, Philippines, and other nearby countries.

Solidago decurrens is a perennial herb up to 100 cm (40 inches) tall. One plant produces many small yellow flower heads in a large branching array at the top of the plant.
