= Solidago pulchra =

Scientific classification
- Kingdom: Plantae
- Clade: Embryophytes
- Clade: Tracheophytes
- Clade: Angiosperms
- Clade: Eudicots
- Clade: Asterids
- Order: Asterales
- Family: Asteraceae
- Genus: Solidago
- Species: S. pulchra

Binomial name
- Solidago pulchra Small

Species of flowering plant

Solidago pulchra, the Carolina goldenrod, is a rare North American plant species in the family Asteraceae. It has been found only in the states of North Carolina and South Carolina in the southeastern United States.

Solidago pulchra is a hairless perennial herb up to 80 centimeters (30 inches) tall, with a branched woody rootstock. One plant can produce as many as 50 flowers in an elongated array. Ray flowers are yellow, 6-14 per head. Disk flowers number 12-30 per head. The species grows in moist, sandy depressions in pine woodlands.
