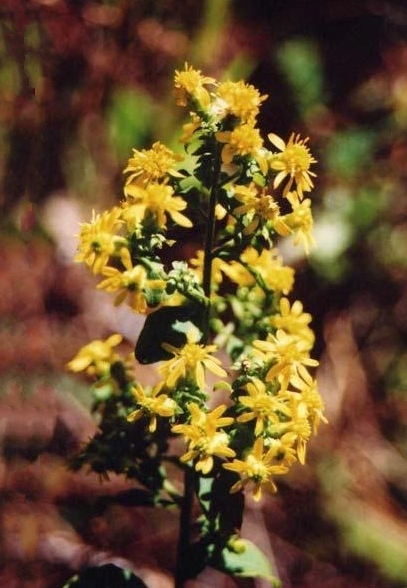

Conservation status
- Critically Imperiled (NatureServe)

Scientific classification
- Kingdom: Plantae
- Clade: Tracheophytes
- Clade: Angiosperms
- Clade: Eudicots
- Clade: Asterids
- Order: Asterales
- Family: Asteraceae
- Genus: Solidago
- Species: S. villosicarpa

Binomial name
- Solidago villosicarpa LeBlond

= Solidago villosicarpa =

Species of flowering plant

Solidago villosicarpa is a species of flowering plant in the family Asteraceae known by the common names hairy-seed goldenrod, coastal goldenrod, glandular wand goldenrod, and shaggy-fruit goldenrod. It is endemic to North Carolina in the United States, where there are only four known populations.

Solidago villosicarpa is a subsection of the Solidago Squarrosae (Bicolor) group that is found east of the Rocky Mountains in Canada and the United States.

Solidago villosicarpa was first collected in 1949, misidentified for several decades, and described as a new species in 2000. It is a perennial herb that can grow to 1.5 meters (5 feet) tall. There is usually a single erect stem which may be brownish to bluish and has rough hairs. The basal rosette of leaves may be up to 30 centimeters (0.98 feet) wide and may persist until the flowering stage. The leaves are serrated and lined with hairs. The inflorescence contains sometimes as many as 100 flower heads, each head containing 4-8 yellow ray florets surrounding 10-18 disc florets. The fruits are covered in long hairs.

This species is native to the coastal plain of North Carolina. It occurs in a variety of habitat types, but it is always found within 1,000 feet (300 meters) of an estuary. It grows in several types of forest habitat and maritime scrub. It grows on the coast or farther inland next to tidal waters. The plant is likely adapted to patterns of disturbance, except for fire. The sites where it is currently found have all been logged at some point. The plants also respond positively to hurricane damage, where surrounding trees are blown down. The species is probably not tolerant of shade and does better when the canopy is opened or removed.

Each of the four known populations has between 100 and 1400 individuals. It is considered critically imperiled.
