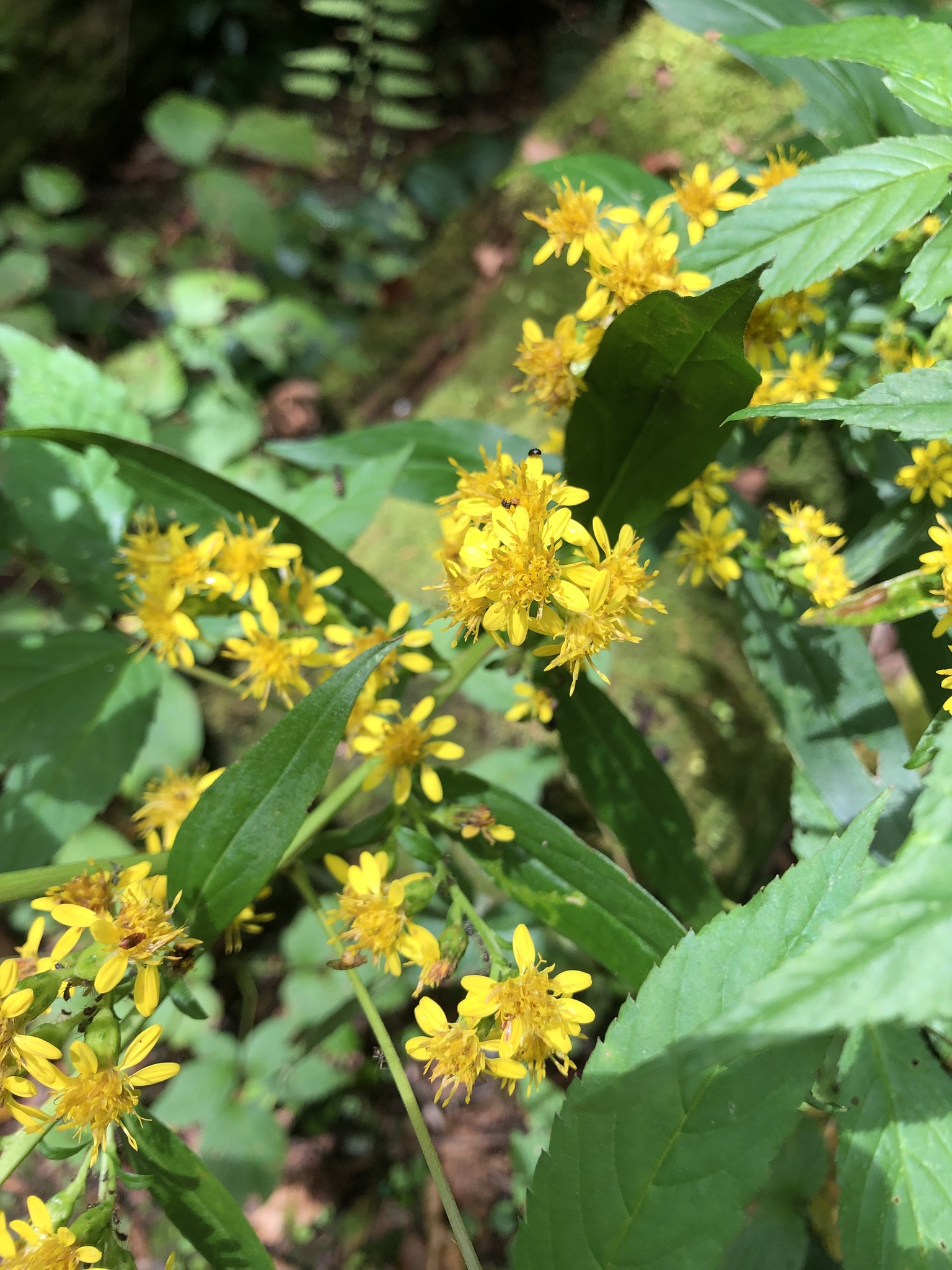

Scientific classification
- Kingdom: Plantae
- Clade: Tracheophytes
- Clade: Angiosperms
- Clade: Eudicots
- Clade: Asterids
- Order: Asterales
- Family: Asteraceae
- Genus: Solidago
- Species: S. glomerata

Binomial name
- Solidago glomerata Michx.

Synonyms
- Actipsis glomerata (Michx.) Raf.; Actipsis squamosa Raf.; Aster glomeratus (Michx.) Kuntze

= Solidago glomerata =

Species of plant

Solidago glomerata, the clustered goldenrod or skunk goldenrod, is a plant species known only from the mountains of Tennessee and North Carolina. It occurs in spruce woodlands and on rocky outcrops, at elevations over 1500 m (4500 feet)

Solidago glomerata has fleshy, rubbery leaves and yellow flower heads born in groups in the axils of the leaves and at the end of the stem.
