= Solidago lancifolia =

Scientific classification
- Kingdom: Plantae
- Clade: Tracheophytes
- Clade: Angiosperms
- Clade: Eudicots
- Clade: Asterids
- Order: Asterales
- Family: Asteraceae
- Genus: Solidago
- Species: S. lancifolia

Binomial name
- Solidago lancifolia (Torr. & A.Gray) Chapm. 1860

Synonyms
- Aster lancifolius (Torr. & A.Gray) Kuntze 1891; Solidago ambigua var. lancifolia Torr. & A.Gray 1842

Species of flowering plant

Solidago lancifolia, known as lance-leaf goldenrod, is a rare North American plant in the family Asteraceae. It is found only in the Appalachian Mountains of Virginia, Tennessee, and North Carolina.

Solidago lancifolia is a perennial herb sometimes as much as 160 cm (64 inches or 5 1/3 feet) tall. One plant can produce as many as 400 small yellow flower headss, borne in a large showy array at the top of the plant and also smaller groups on side branches. Each head contains 5-8 ray florets surrounding 5-12 disc florets.
