= Solidago altiplanities =

Scientific classification
- Kingdom: Plantae
- Clade: Tracheophytes
- Clade: Angiosperms
- Clade: Eudicots
- Clade: Asterids
- Order: Asterales
- Family: Asteraceae
- Genus: Solidago
- Species: S. altiplanities

Binomial name
- Solidago altiplanities C.E.S.Taylor & R.J.Taylor

Species of flowering plant

Solidago altiplanities, the high plains goldenrod, is a plant species native to the high-altitude plains of Oklahoma and the Texas Panhandle, often found on ridges and escarpments.

Solidago altiplanities is an herb up to 1 m (39 inches) tall, spreading by underground rhizomes. One plant can produce as many as 350 small yellow flower heads in a broad, conical array.
