= Solidago delicatula =

Scientific classification
- Kingdom: Plantae
- Clade: Tracheophytes
- Clade: Angiosperms
- Clade: Eudicots
- Clade: Asterids
- Order: Asterales
- Family: Asteraceae
- Genus: Solidago
- Species: S. delicatula

Binomial name
- Solidago delicatula Small

Synonyms
- Solidago helleri Small; Solidago microphylla (A.Gray) Engelm. ex Small; Solidago ulmifolia var. microphylla A.Gray

Species of flowering plant

Solidago delicatula, commonly called smooth elm-leaf goldenrod, is a North American species of flowering plants in the family Asteraceae. It is native to the southern Great Plains of the United States, in the states of Texas, Oklahoma, Kansas, Arkansas, and Louisiana.

Solidago delicatula is a perennial herb up to 120 cm (4 feet) tall with a woody underground caudex. One plant can produce as many as 480 small yellow flower heads in a large branched array at the top of the plant.

This species is host to the fillowing insect induced gall:

- Asteromyia carbonifera (Osten Sacken, 1862)

external link to gallformers
