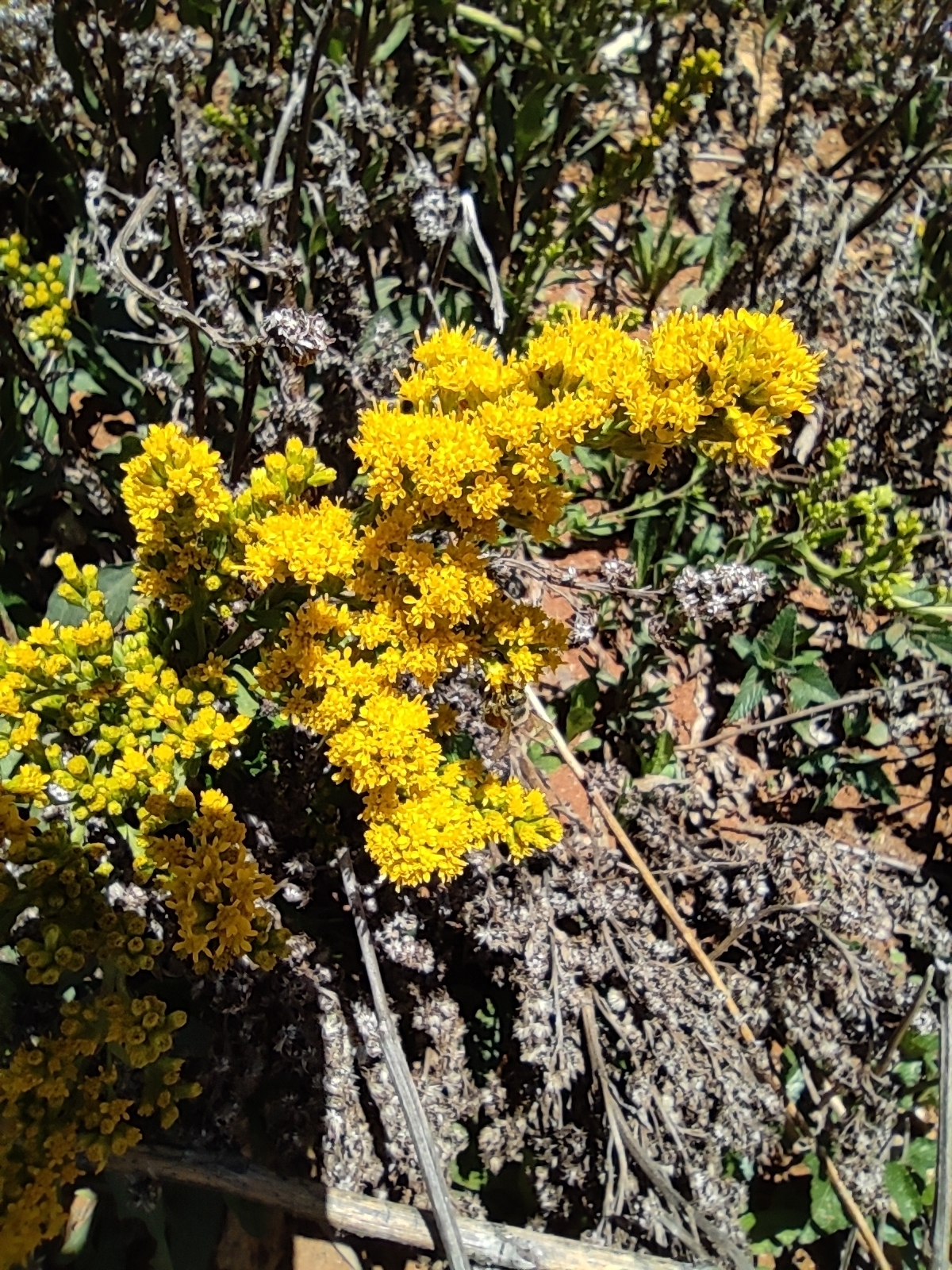

Scientific classification
- Kingdom: Plantae
- Clade: Tracheophytes
- Clade: Angiosperms
- Clade: Eudicots
- Clade: Asterids
- Order: Asterales
- Family: Asteraceae
- Genus: Solidago
- Species: S. hintoniorum

Binomial name
- Solidago hintoniorum G.L.Nesom

= Solidago hintoniorum =

Species of flowering plant

Solidago hintoniorum is rare Mexican species of flowering plants in the family Asteraceae. It has been found in Nuevo León, Tamaulipas, and Coahuila in northeastern Mexico.

Solidago hintoniorum is a perennial herb up to 100 cm (40 inches) tall, spreading by means of underground rhizomes. Leaves are lance-shaped, up to 10 cm (4 inches) long. Flower heads are yellow, in elongated arrays at the tops of the stems.
