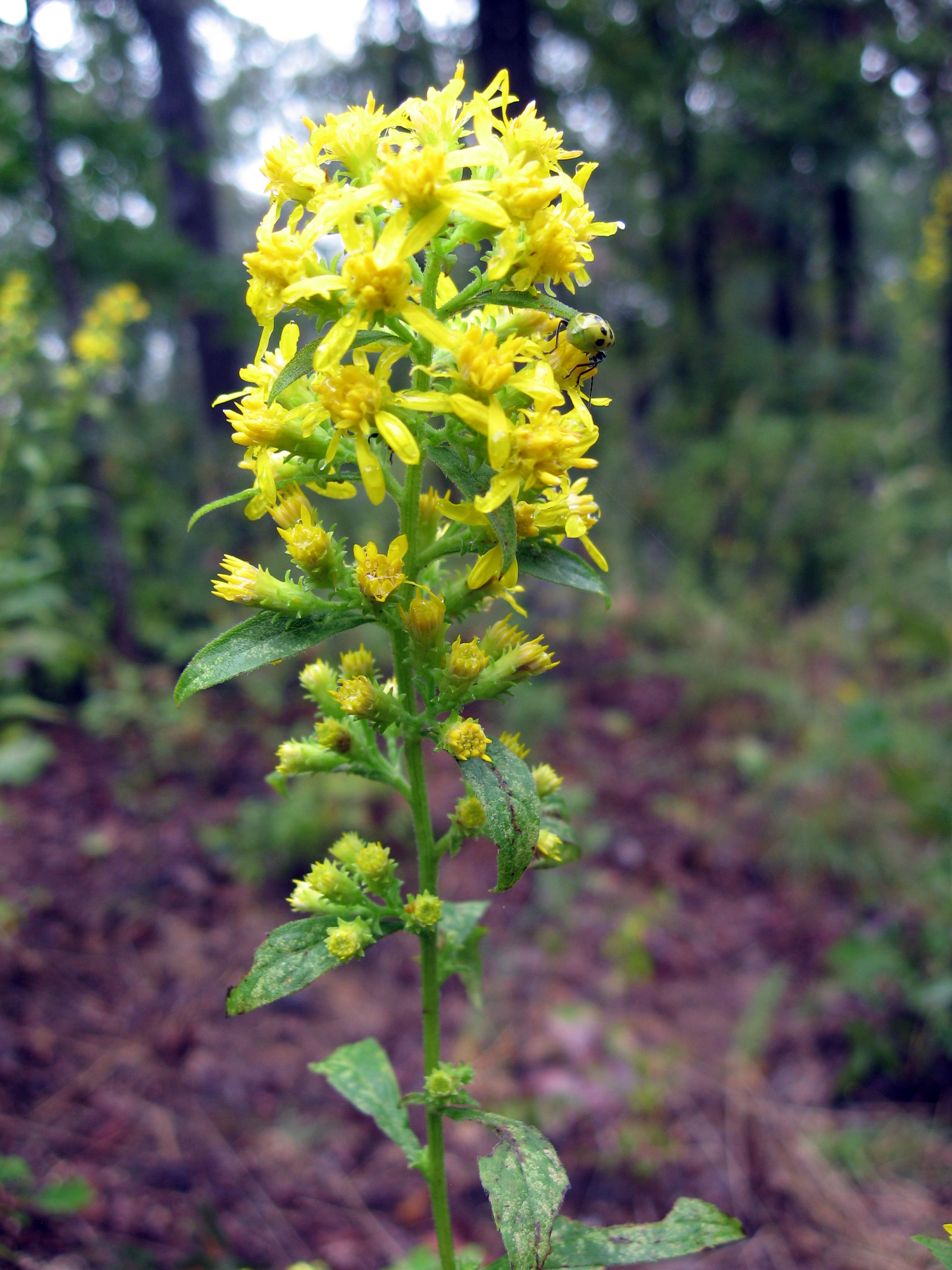

Scientific classification
- Kingdom: Plantae
- Clade: Tracheophytes
- Clade: Angiosperms
- Clade: Eudicots
- Clade: Asterids
- Order: Asterales
- Family: Asteraceae
- Genus: Solidago
- Species: S. buckleyi

Binomial name
- Solidago buckleyi Torr. & A.Gray

Synonyms
- Aster buckleyi (Torr. & A.Gray) Kuntze

= Solidago buckleyi =

Species of flowering plant

Solidago buckleyi, or Buckley's goldenrod, is a species of goldenrod native to central North America. It is an uncommon species with a small range, being found mainly in the Ozark Mountains of Arkansas and Missouri, and in the uplands near the confluence of the Ohio and Mississippi Rivers near southern Illinois and western Kentucky. There are also a few isolated populations reported from Indiana. Its preferred habitat is open oak woodlands.

Solidago buckleyi is a perennial herb up to 120 cm (48 inches) tall with large woody taproots. Basal leaves wilt before flowering time; stem leaves become progressively smaller further up the stem. Heads number up to 160, in an elongate paniculate array. Ray flowers 6-8 per head, disc flowers 8–14.
