= Solidago faucibus =

Conservation status
- Vulnerable (NatureServe)

Scientific classification
- Kingdom: Plantae
- Clade: Tracheophytes
- Clade: Angiosperms
- Clade: Eudicots
- Clade: Asterids
- Order: Asterales
- Family: Asteraceae
- Genus: Solidago
- Species: S. faucibus

Binomial name
- Solidago faucibus Wieboldt

Species of flowering plant

Solidago faucibus, the gorge goldenrod, is North American species of flowering plants in the family Asteraceae. It was recognized as a distinct species in 2003. It is found primarily in the southern Appalachian Mountains of the southeastern United States, in the states of Virginia, West Virginia, Kentucky, Tennessee, and South Carolina. It is found in mesic forested gorges, often growing under Tsuga canadensis.

Solidago faucibus is a perennial herb up to 150 cm (5 feet) tall, with a branching underground caudex. Leaves very broad, almost round, up to 20 cm (8 inches) long, with large teeth along the edges. One plant can produce as many as 70 small yellow flower heads in a branching array.
