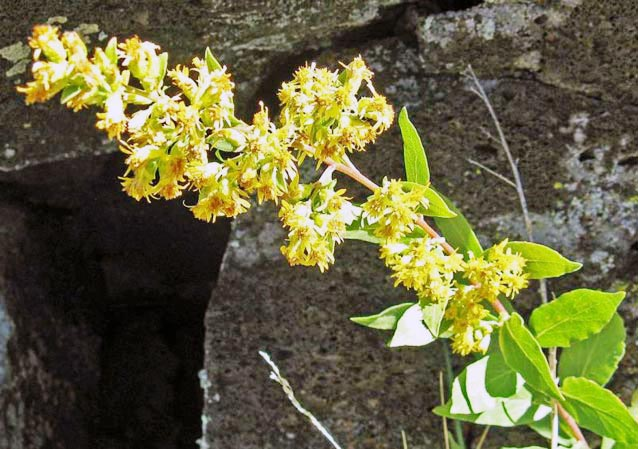

Scientific classification
- Kingdom: Plantae
- Clade: Tracheophytes
- Clade: Angiosperms
- Clade: Eudicots
- Clade: Asterids
- Order: Asterales
- Family: Asteraceae
- Genus: Solidago
- Species: S. capulinensis

Binomial name
- Solidago capulinensis Cockerell & D.M.Andrews

= Solidago capulinensis =

Species of plant

Solidago capulinensis, known as the Capulin goldenrod is a rare plant endemic to Capulin Volcano National Monument and Las Animas County, Colorado and was first described and collected in 1936 by Theodore Dru Alison Cockerell and Darwin Maxson Andrews.

The species was cultivated as an ornamental from the 1930's until the 1970's, but not found in the wild since the initial collection. As botanists only knew the plant from a single collected specimen, it was not included in any subsequent account of the New Mexico or United States flora. Academic interest in the species came after it was rediscovered lining a walkway at the Pueblo Colorado Nature Center in Pueblo, Colorado, which prompted a new survey within Capulin Volcano National Monument. Capulin goldenrod was subsequently found growing throughout the monument and re-identified as a rare endemic plant. It is the only known rare vascular plant species in the monument.

== Status and trends ==
Only two floristic surveys exist for Capulin Volcano National Monument; Parmenter at al. (2000) conducted a rare-species inventory and Johnson et al. (2003) completed a comprehensive floristic survey. Results from both surveys reported no rare plants found within the monument. Between 2005 and 2009, Natural Heritage New Mexico completed a vegetation classification and mapping project for the monument. Plant species were recorded from within vegetation plots but did not include Capulin goldenrod. The intention of the Natural Heritage study was to detect dominant plant species, not to conduct a detailed floristic survey that would detect rare species. As of 2015, two informal surveys have been conducted to specifically document the presence of Capulin goldenrod in the monument, however, its abundance and distribution are not well known.
