= Solidago macvaughii =

Scientific classification
- Kingdom: Plantae
- Clade: Tracheophytes
- Clade: Angiosperms
- Clade: Eudicots
- Clade: Asterids
- Order: Asterales
- Family: Asteraceae
- Genus: Solidago
- Species: S. macvaughii

Binomial name
- Solidago macvaughii G.L.Nesom

Species of flowering plant

Solidago macvaughii is a rare plant species native to Mexico. The species is known from only two locations in the state of Aguascalientes in Mexico.

Solidago macvaughii is a perennial herb up to 100 cm (40 inches) tall, spreading by means of stolons running along the surface of the ground. The leaves near the bottom of the stem can be up to 7 cm (2.8 inches) long; leaves get progressively smaller higher up on the stem. One plant can produce many small yellow flower heads in a large, branching array at the top of the plant.
