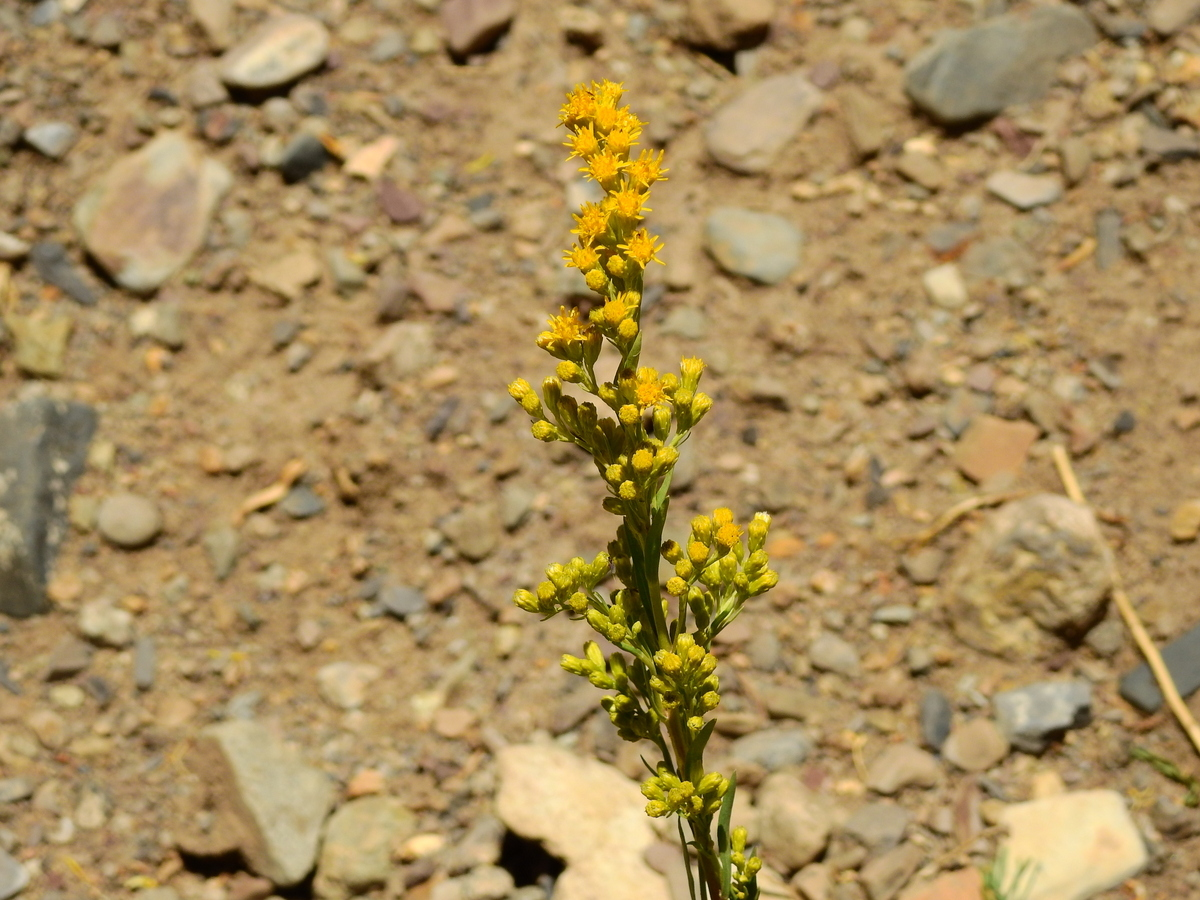

Scientific classification
- Kingdom: Plantae
- Clade: Tracheophytes
- Clade: Angiosperms
- Clade: Eudicots
- Clade: Asterids
- Order: Asterales
- Family: Asteraceae
- Genus: Solidago
- Species: S. argentinensis

Binomial name
- Solidago argentinensis López Laphitz & Semple

= Solidago argentinensis =

Species of plant

Solidago argentinensis is South American species of flowering plants in the family Asteraceae. It is native to Argentina (Provinces of Chubut, Neuquén, Río Negro), Chile (Juncal) and Bolivia (Cochabamba).

Solidago argentinensis is a perennial herb up to 50 cm (20 inches) tall spreading by means of underground rhizomes. Flower heads are in large, branching arrays at the ends of branches, sometimes drooping near the top. Each head contains 6–19 ray florets surrounding 5–19 disc florets.
