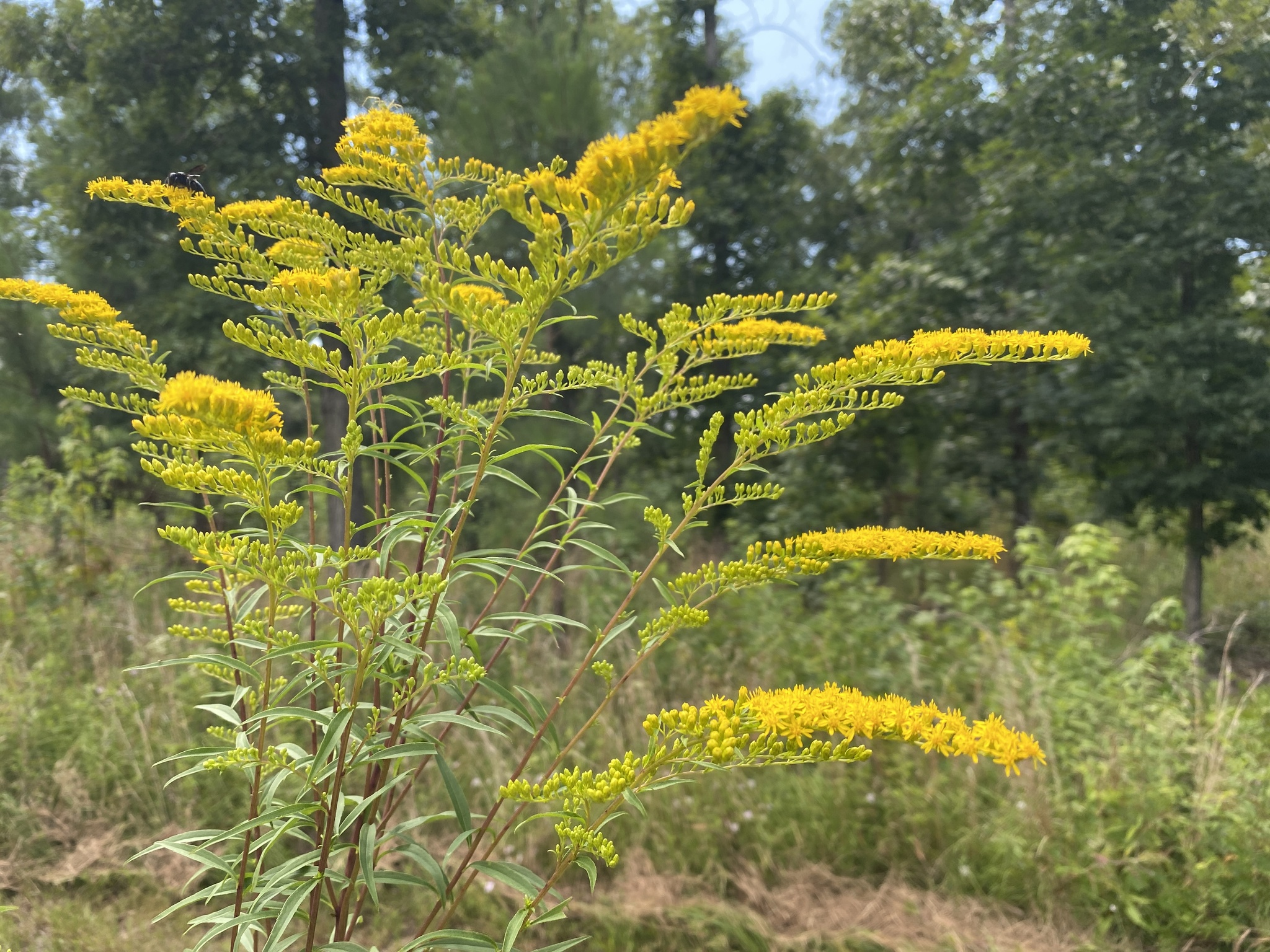

Scientific classification
- Kingdom: Plantae
- Clade: Tracheophytes
- Clade: Angiosperms
- Clade: Eudicots
- Clade: Asterids
- Order: Asterales
- Family: Asteraceae
- Genus: Solidago
- Species: S. pinetorum

Binomial name
- Solidago pinetorum Small

= Solidago pinetorum =

Species of flowering plant

Solidago pinetorum is a North American plant species in the family Asteraceae, called Small's goldenrod or pineywoods goldenrod. It is found in the east-central United States: Virginia, West Virginia, and the Carolinas.

Solidago pinetorum is a perennial herb up to 110 cm (44 inches) tall, spreading by means of underground rhizomes. One plant can produce as many as 350 small yellow flower heads in a showy branching array at the top of the plant. The plant grows in open places, often in pine woodlands on hillsides.
