= Solidago microglossa =

Scientific classification
- Kingdom: Plantae
- Clade: Tracheophytes
- Clade: Angiosperms
- Clade: Eudicots
- Clade: Asterids
- Order: Asterales
- Family: Asteraceae
- Genus: Solidago
- Species: S. microglossa

Binomial name
- Solidago microglossa DC. 1836

Species of flowering plant

Solidago microglossa is a South American plant species in the family Asteraceae. It is native to Brazil, Bolivia, Paraguay, Uruguay, and northern Argentina.

Solidago microglossa is a perennial herb up to 100 cm (40 inches) tall, spreading by means of underground rhizomes. The leaves are thin and lance-shaped, up to 7 cm (2.8 inches) long; leaves get progressively smaller higher up on the stem. One plant can produce many small yellow flower heads in a large, branching, conical array at the top of the plant.
