= Solidago perornata =

Scientific classification
- Kingdom: Plantae
- Clade: Tracheophytes
- Clade: Angiosperms
- Clade: Eudicots
- Clade: Asterids
- Order: Asterales
- Family: Asteraceae
- Genus: Solidago
- Species: S. perornata

Binomial name
- Solidago perornata Lunell

Synonyms
- Doria perornata (Lunell) Lunell

Species of flowering plant

Solidago perornata is a rare North American plant species in the family Asteraceae. It is native to the state of North Dakota in the north-central United States. It was first described in 1911 from specimens collected near Turtle Mountains in Rolette County.

Solidago perornata is a perennial herb up to 100 cm (40 inches) tall. Leaves are lance-shaped. The plant produces flower heads in a one-sided display at the top of the stem.
