= Solidago durangensis =

Scientific classification
- Kingdom: Plantae
- Clade: Tracheophytes
- Clade: Angiosperms
- Clade: Eudicots
- Clade: Asterids
- Order: Asterales
- Family: Asteraceae
- Genus: Solidago
- Species: S. durangensis

Binomial name
- Solidago durangensis G.L.Nesom

Species of flowering plant

Solidago durangensis is very rare Mexican species of flowering plants in the family Asteraceae. It is known only from a few collections made in the 1890s near the city of Durango in northern Mexico, and not seen since. It is very likely now extinct.

Solidago durangensis is (was?) a perennial herb up to 100 cm (40 inches) tall. Leaves were lance-shaped, up to 10 cm (4 inches) long. Flower heads are in flat-topped arrays at the ends of branches.
