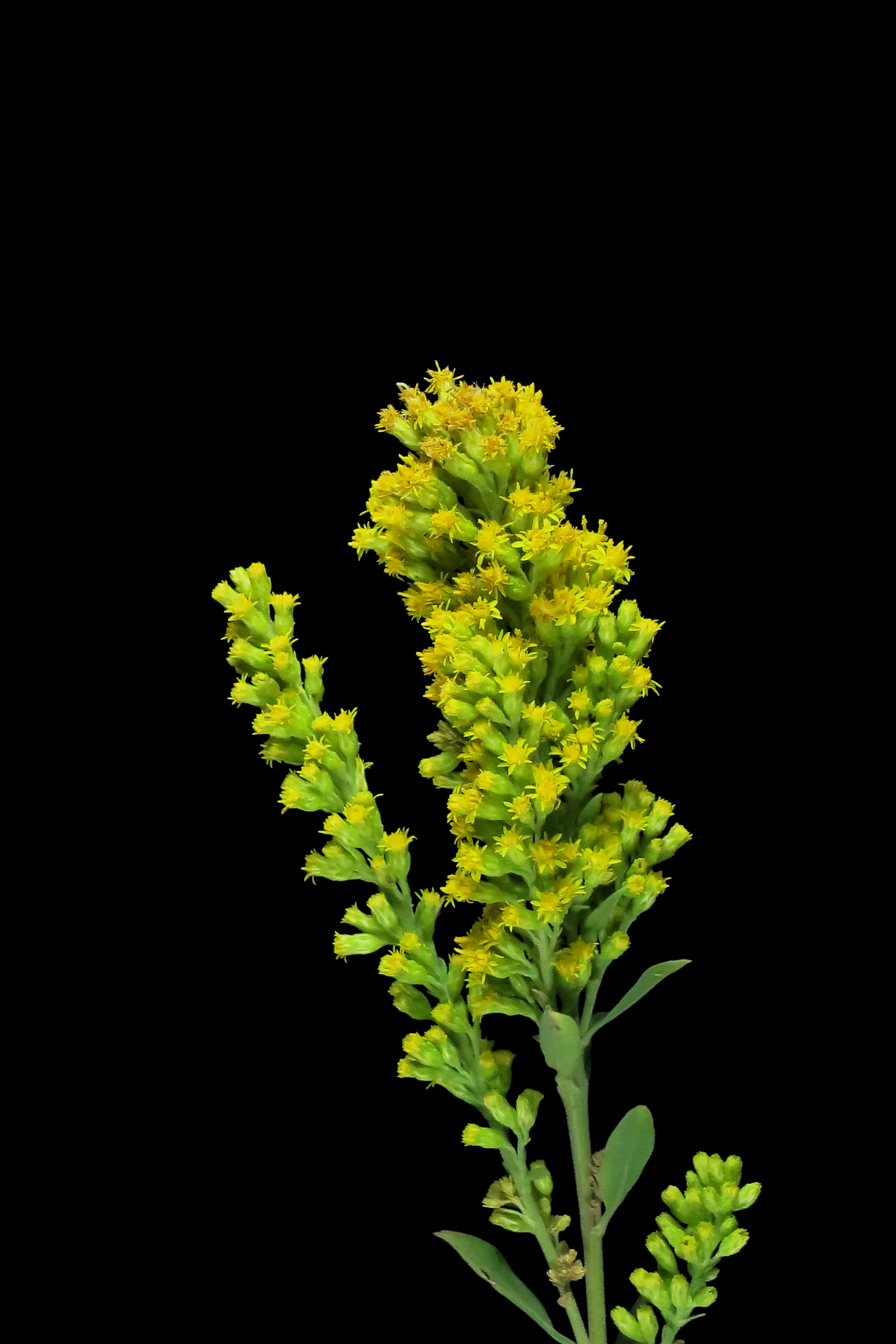

Conservation status
- Secure (NatureServe)

Scientific classification
- Kingdom: Plantae
- Clade: Tracheophytes
- Clade: Angiosperms
- Clade: Eudicots
- Clade: Asterids
- Order: Asterales
- Family: Asteraceae
- Genus: Solidago
- Species: S. elongata

Binomial name
- Solidago elongata Nutt. 1840 conserved name, not Pépin 1834 rejected name

Synonyms
- Aster elongatus (Nutt.) Kuntze 1891 not Thunb. 1800; Cineraria hirta Vahl ex DC.; Solidago caurina Piper

= Solidago elongata =

Species of flowering plant

Solidago elongata, commonly called West Coast Canada goldenrod or Cascade Canada goldenrod, is a North American species of flowering plants in the family Asteraceae. It is native to western Canada, western United States, and northwestern Mexico, primarily in British Columbia, Washington, Oregon, California, and Baja California, with a few populations in Nevada and Idaho. It grows in the Coast Ranges, the Sierra Nevada, the Cascades, and other mountain ranges in the region.

Solidago elongata is a perennial herb up to 150 cm (5 feet) tall, spreading by means of underground rhizomes. One plant can produce 500 or more small yellow flower heads in a large branching (sometimes drooping) array at the top of the plant.
