= Solidago brachyphylla =

Scientific classification
- Kingdom: Plantae
- Clade: Tracheophytes
- Clade: Angiosperms
- Clade: Eudicots
- Clade: Asterids
- Order: Asterales
- Family: Asteraceae
- Genus: Solidago
- Species: S. brachyphylla

Binomial name
- Solidago brachyphylla Chapm. ex Torr. & A.Gray

Synonyms
- Solidago boottii var. brachyphylla (Chapm. ex Torr. & A.Gray) A.Gray; Solidago pallescens Mohr

Species of flowering plant

Solidago brachyphylla is a North American species of flowering plant in the family Asteraceae known by the common name Dixie goldenrod. It is native to the southeastern United States, from southern Mississippi to the Carolinas.

Solidago brachyphylla is a perennial herb up to 120 cm (4 feet) tall, with a thick underground rhizome. One plant can produce as many as 200 small yellow flower heads in a branched array at the top of the plant.

It can be found in habitats such as oak-pine-hickory uplands, in xeric oak woodlands, and scrub courses.
