= Solidago ericamerioides =

Scientific classification
- Kingdom: Plantae
- Clade: Tracheophytes
- Clade: Angiosperms
- Clade: Eudicots
- Clade: Asterids
- Order: Asterales
- Family: Asteraceae
- Genus: Solidago
- Species: S. ericamerioides

Binomial name
- Solidago ericamerioides G.L.Nesom

Species of flowering plant

Solidago ericamerioides is rare Mexican species of flowering plants in the family Asteraceae. It has been found only in the state of Nuevo León in northeastern Mexico.

Solidago ericamerioides is a diminutive species growing on gypsum soils. The plant is a perennial rarely more than 17 cm (6.8 inches) tall. Leaves are up to 2.0 cm (0.8 inches) long. Flower heads are yellow, in flat-topped arrays of no more than 20 heads.
