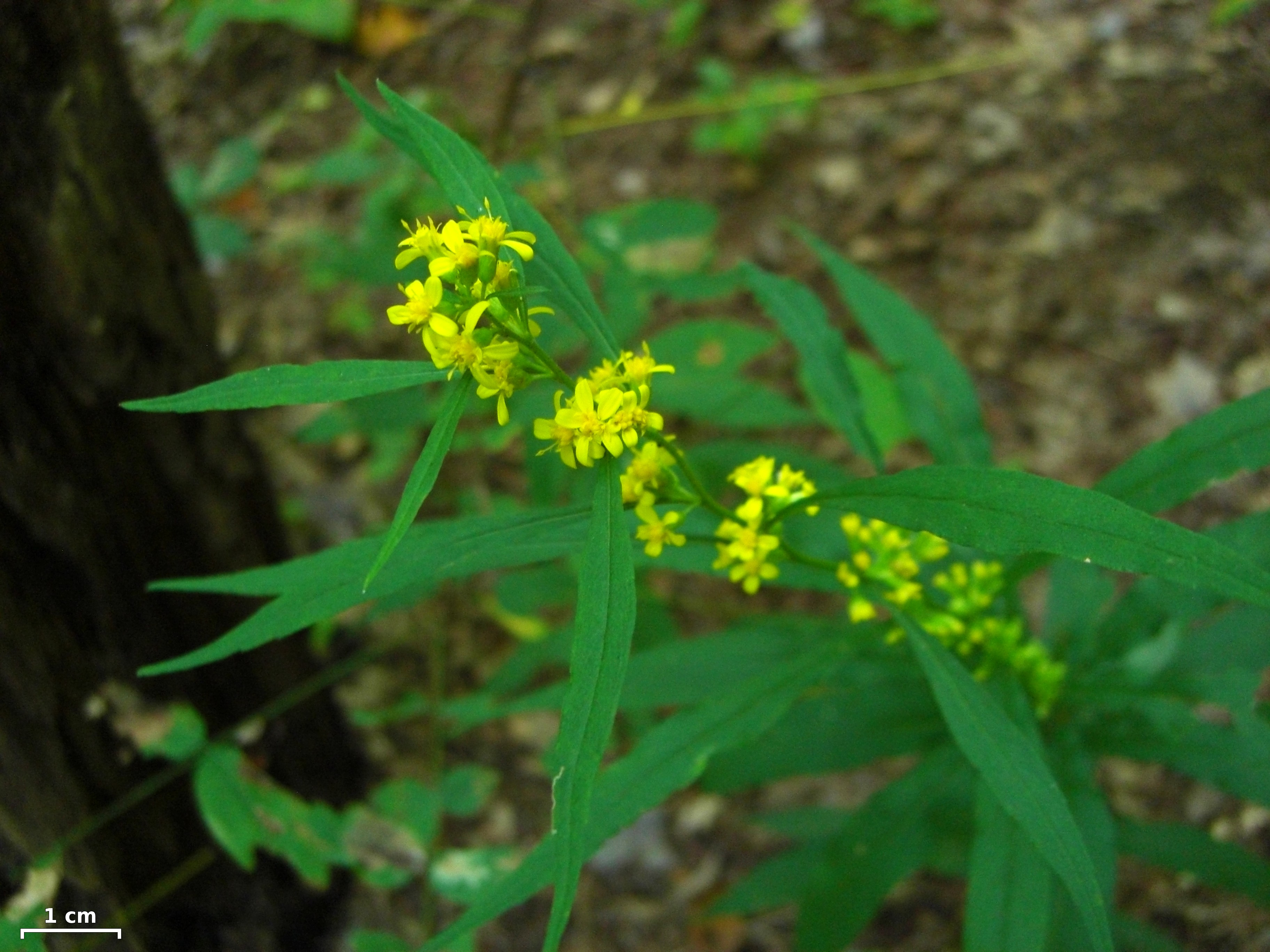

Scientific classification
- Kingdom: Plantae
- Clade: Tracheophytes
- Clade: Angiosperms
- Clade: Eudicots
- Clade: Asterids
- Order: Asterales
- Family: Asteraceae
- Genus: Solidago
- Species: S. curtisii

Binomial name
- Solidago curtisii Torr. & A.Gray

Synonyms
- Solidago ambigua var. curtisii (Torr. & A.Gray) Alph.Wood; Solidago caesia var. curtisii (Torr. & A.Gray) C.E.S.Taylor & R.John Taylor; Solidago caesia var. hispida Alph.Wood; Solidago asterifolia Small, syn of var. flaccidifolia; Solidago flaccidifolia Small, syn of var. flaccidifolia

= Solidago curtisii =

Species of flowering plant

Solidago curtisii, commonly called Curtis' goldenrod and mountain decumbent goldenrod, is a North American species of flowering plants in the family Asteraceae. It is found in the eastern part of the United States from Pennsylvania to Mississippi and Alabama, primarily in the southern Appalachian Mountains.

Solidago curtisii is a perennial herb sometimes as much as 100 cm (40 inches) tall, with a thick, woody underground caudex. Stem is narrow, wiry, and dark purple. One plant can produce up to 800 small yellow flower heads in small clumps in the axils of the leaves.

== Galls ==
This species is host to the fillowing insect induced gall:

- Asteromyia carbonifera (Osten Sacken, 1862)

external link to gallformers

Varieties

- Solidago curtisii var. curtisii - high elevations in mountains from Georgia to West Virginia
- Solidago curtisii var. flaccidifolia (Small) R.E.Cook & Semple - lower elevations from Mississippi to Pennsylvania
