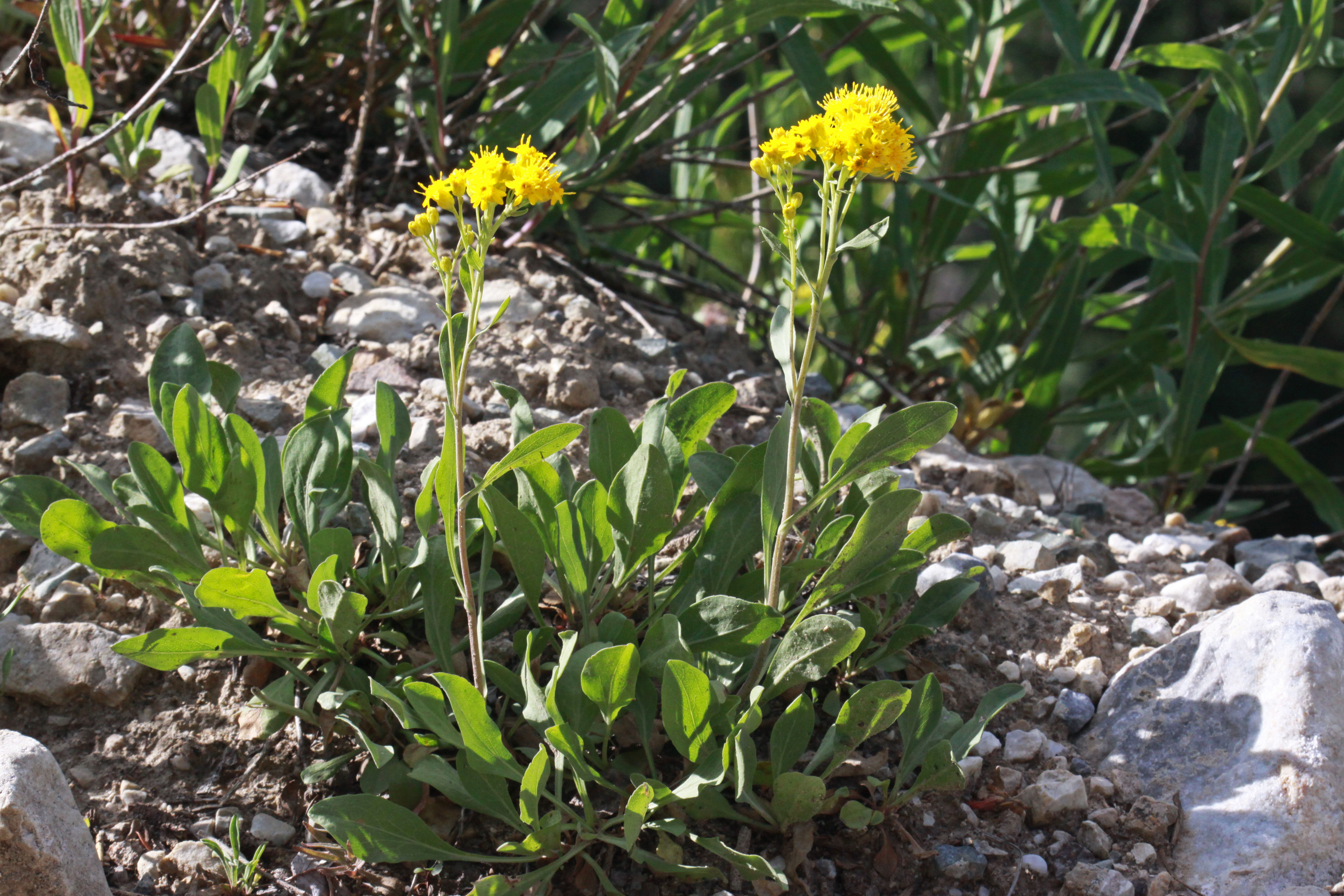

Conservation status
- Secure (NatureServe)

Scientific classification
- Kingdom: Plantae
- Clade: Tracheophytes
- Clade: Angiosperms
- Clade: Eudicots
- Clade: Asterids
- Order: Asterales
- Family: Asteraceae
- Genus: Solidago
- Species: S. nana

Binomial name
- Solidago nana Nutt. 1840

Synonyms
- Synonymy: Aster nanus (Nutt.) Kuntze; Solidago nivea Rydb.; Solidago simplex ssp. simplex var. nana (Nutt.) Ringius; Solidago humilis var. nana (Nutt.) A.Gray; Solidago purshii var. nana (Nutt.) Farwell; Solidago glutinosa var. nana (Nutt.) Cronq.; Solidago spathulata var. nana (Nutt.) Cronq.

= Solidago nana =

Species of flowering plant

Solidago nana is a North American plant species in the family Asteraceae, with the common names baby goldenrod and dwarf goldenrod. The species is native to deserts and mountainsides in the western United States, from the Rocky Mountains to the Great Basin in the states of Idaho, Montana, Nevada, Utah, Wyoming, Colorado, Arizona, and New Mexico.

Solidago nana is a perennial herb up to 50 cm (20 inches) tall, spreading by means of underground rhizomes. The leaves near the bottom of the stem are narrow, up to 10 cm (4 inches) long; leaves get progressively smaller higher up on the stem. One plant can produce as many as 100 small yellow flower heads in a large, flat-topped array at the top of the plant.
