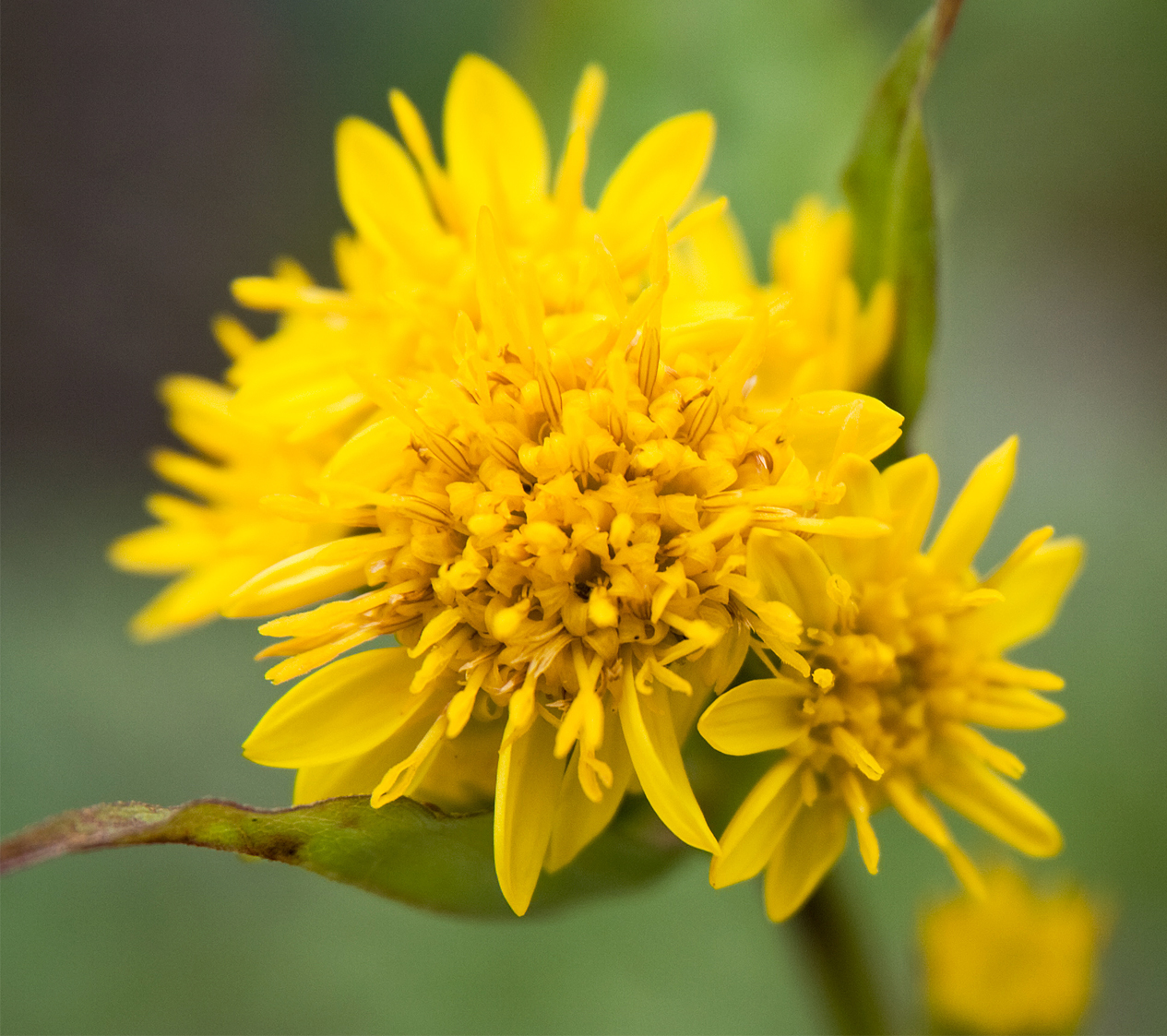
- Solidago virgaurea var. leiocarpa

Scientific classification
- Kingdom: Plantae
- Clade: Tracheophytes
- Clade: Angiosperms
- Clade: Eudicots
- Clade: Asterids
- Order: Asterales
- Family: Asteraceae
- Subfamily: Asteroideae
- Tribe: Astereae
- Subtribe: Solidagininae
- Genus: Solidago; L. 1753 not Mill. 1754

Synonyms
- Actipsis Rafinesque; Aster Linnaeus subg. Solidago (Linnaeus) Kuntze; Leioligo Rafinesque

= Solidago =

Genus of flowering plants

Solidago, commonly called goldenrod, is a genus of about 100 to 120 species of flowering plants in the family Asteraceae. Most are herbaceous perennial species found in open areas such as meadows, prairies, and savannas. They are mostly native to North America, including Mexico; a few species are native to South America and Eurasia. Some American species have also been introduced into Europe and other parts of the world.

== Description ==
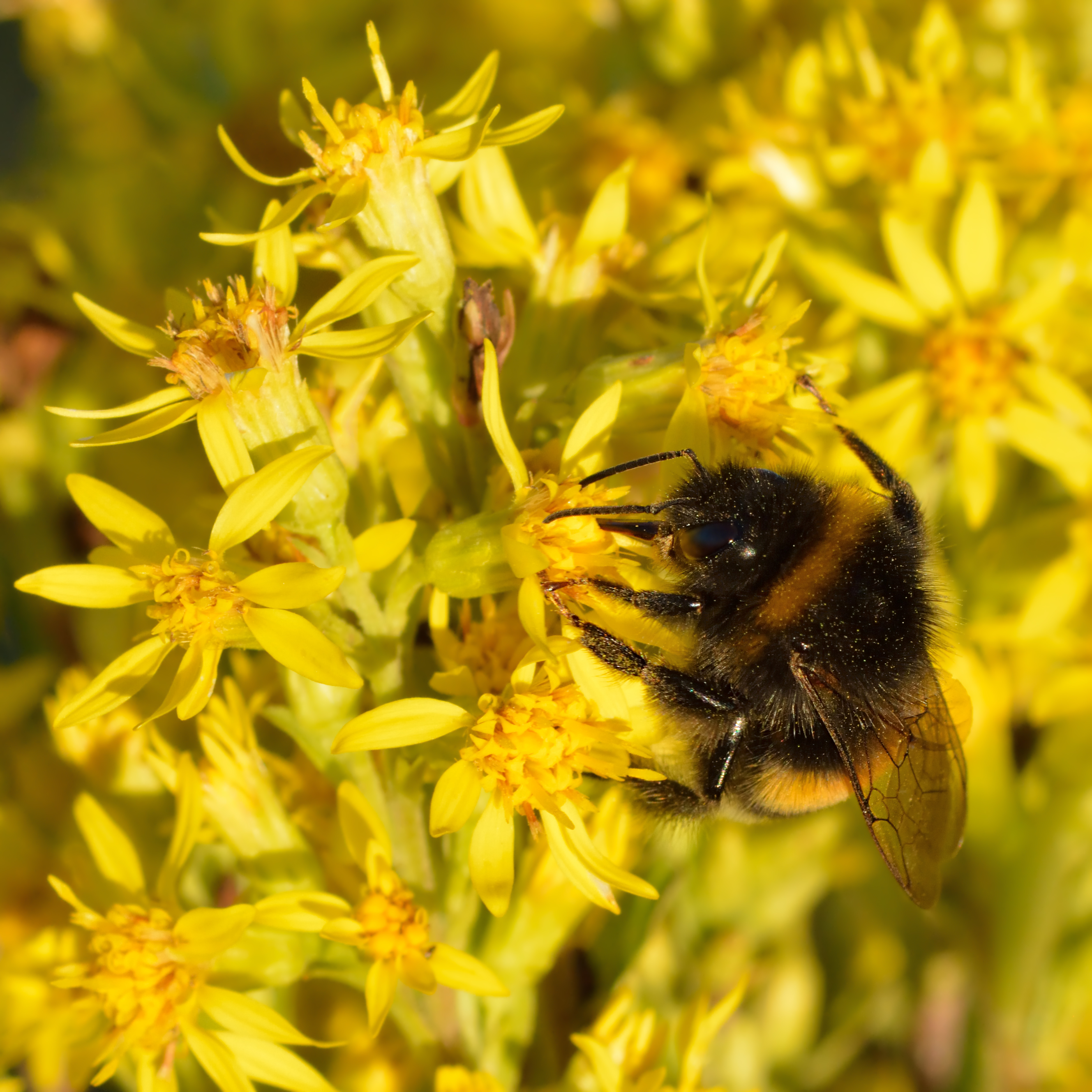
European goldenrod is pollinated by Bombus cryptarum.

Solidago species are perennials growing from woody caudices or rhizomes. Their stems range from decumbent (crawling) to ascending or erect, with a range of heights going from 5 cm (2.0 in) to over a meter. Most species are unbranched, but some do display branching in the upper part of the plant. Both leaves and stems vary from glabrous (hairless) to various forms of pubescence (strigose, strigillose, hispid, stipitate-glandular or villous). In some species, the basal leaves are shed before flowering. The leaf margins are most commonly entire, but often display heavier serration. Some leaves may display trinerved venation rather than the pinnate venation usual across Asteraceae.

The flower heads are usually of the radiate type (typical daisy flower heads with distinct ray and disc florets) but sometimes discoid (with only disc florets of mixed, sterile, male and types). Only ray florets are female, others are male, hermaphroditic or entire sterile. Head involucres are campanulate to cylindric or attenuate. Floret corollas are usually yellow, but white in the ray florets of a few species (such as Solidago bicolor); they are typically hairless. Heads usually include between 2 and 35 disc florets, but in some species this may go up to 60. Filaments are inserted closer to the base of the corolla than its middle. Numerous heads are usually grouped in complex compound inflorescences where heads are arranged in multiple racemes, panicles, corymbs, or secund arrays (with florets all on the same side).

Solidago cypselae are narrowly obconic to cylindrical in shape, and they are sometimes somewhat compressed. They have eight to 10 ribs usually and are hairless or moderately hispid. The pappus is very big with barbellate bristles.

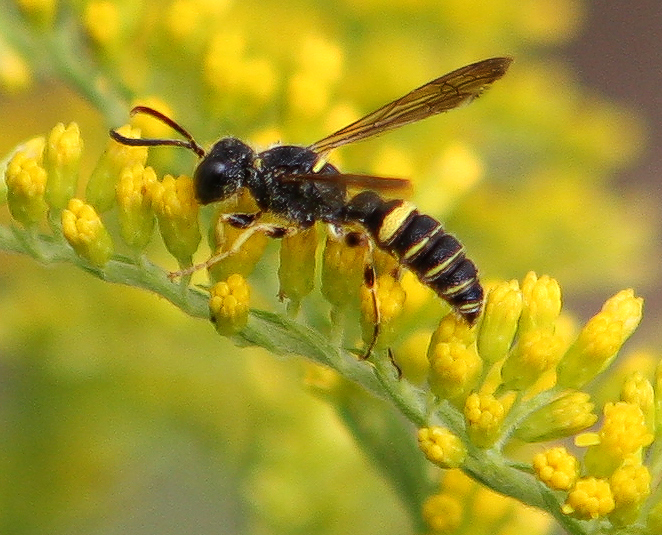
Goldenrod and visiting Cerceris wasp

The many goldenrod species can be difficult to distinguish, due to their similar bright, golden-yellow flower heads that bloom in late summer. Propagation is by wind-disseminated seeds or by spreading underground rhizomes which can form colonies of vegetative clones of a single plant. They are mostly short-day plants and bloom in late summer and early fall. Some species produce abundant nectar when moisture is plentiful, or when the weather is warm and sunny.

The section Ptarmicoidei is sometimes treated as a separate genus Oligoneuron, and is dropped by flat-topped to rounded corymbiform flowerheads.

== Taxonomy ==
Solidago is in the family Asteraceae (formerly known as Compositae), a diverse and widespread clade containing approximately 23,000 species and 12 tribes, which inhabit all continents except Antarctica. Within Asteraceae, Solidago is in the tribe Astereae and the subtribe Solidagininaeae.

The genus Solidago is monophyletic as indicated by morphological characters and molecular evidence. All Solidago species are herbaceous perennials, growing from approximately 2 cm (0.8 in) to 2.5 m (8 ft 2 in) tall. Yellow to white, pistillate ray flowers and yellow, perfect disc florets are characteristic of Solidago inflorescences, which have a wide range of shapes. Molecular studies using nuclear rDNA have hypothesized boundaries on the genus Solidago, but there have been difficulties in parsing out evolutionary relationships at the sub-genus scale and defining which should be included and separated from Solidago.

=== Solidago and related taxa ===
Related Asteraceae genera, such as Chrysoma, Euthamia, and Oreochrysum, have been included within Solidago at one point or another, but morphological evidence has suggested otherwise. In a study comparing morphological characters of Solidago and related subgroups, the authors consider the subjectivity of classifying a genus and how to define it within broader tendencies concerning the taxonomy of North American Asteraceae. Little to no differences were observed between Solidago and the subgroups in terms of karyotype. However, external morphological characters such as habit, or the general appearance of the plant and how a suite of traits contribute to its phenotype; pappus size; and the point of freeing of stamen filaments from the corolla tube, are useful classification schemes for Solidago, since they are applied to differentiating between Asteraceae taxa. One school of Asteraceae taxonomy thought unites all taxa sharing similar floral head structure and subsequently ignores deviation from this morphology, while another places greater weight on these morphological deviations. The authors argue that the latter opinion should be applied. Since there is no theoretical foundation for relative taxonomic importance of traits, they assert that habit should be a central trait when defining taxa, and subsequently that all the subgroups considered in their study (Brachychaeta, Chrysoma, Euthamia, Oligoneuron, and Petradoria) should be segregated from Solidago.

Results from a leaf anatomy study comparing differences in mesophyll, bundle sheath extensions, and midvein structure, among others in a suite of leaf traits, are incongruent with those in an earlier study. Based on the lack of bundle sheath extensions, it is suggested that Chrysoma, Euthamia, Gundlachia, and Petradoria should be distinct taxa and outside of Solidago. However, Brachychaeta, Brintonia, Oligoneuron, Oreochrysum, and Aster ptarmicoides should be considered as components of Solidago. To summarize, the relation of Brachychaeta and Oligoneuron to Solidago is inconsistent based on these results. Both support the separation of Chrysoma, Euthamia, and Petradoria from Solidago. A study reviews the taxonomic position of Oligoneuron relative to Solidago, as based on taxonomic evidence, treats it as separate from Solidago, similarly to Kapoor & Beaudry (1966). The first molecular phylogeny based on chloroplast DNA treats Brachychaeta, Brintonia, Oligoneuron, and Oreochrysum as constituents of Solidago. Using consensus trees from ITS data, another study found support for Oligoneuron as part of Solidago, and the findings of Zhang (1996). More recently, an analysis of combined ITS and ETS data provided additional support for the inclusion of Oligoneuron as part of Solidago.

Until the 1980s, the genus Euthamia was largely considered to be a part of Solidago due to morphological similarities between species in both genera, and a history of synonymy of Solidago lanceolata and Euthamia graminifolia. As mentioned, the lack of bundle sheath extensions in Euthamia compared to Solidago, and deviations in floral morphology present evidence for separation of these taxa. A taxonomy of Euthamia as a genus was presented, providing a detailed description of distinguishing external morphological characters, such as fibrous-roots, sessile leaves, and mostly corymbiform inflorescences.

=== Evolutionary relationships within Solidago ===
Chromosome counts and advances in molecular systematics have enabled greater understanding of evolutionary relationships within Solidago. At the time a taxonomy of Solidago was published, related taxa causing contention, such as Chrysoma, Euthamia, Oligoneuron, and Petradoria, were excluded from this genus. The number of Solidago species has remained relatively stable, around 120, with approximately 80 in North America. Due to monophyletic support for the New World taxa and taxonomic difficulties with Old World taxa, the taxonomy provided in the 1990s only includes North American taxa and thus treats Solidago as non-monophyletic. Existing molecular-based phylogenies provide monophyletic support for Solidago given its inclusion of Oligoneuron.

Chromosome counts have proven to be a valuable character in Solidago taxonomy and in elucidating the cytogeographic history of the genus. Similar chromosome counts may indicate close evolutionary relationships, while different chromosome numbers may suggest distant relationships through reproductive isolation. Chromosome counts have been studied extensively in North America; all Solidago species have a base chromosome number of x=9, but the following ploidy levels have been observed: 2x, 3x, 4x, 6x, 8x, 10x, 12x, and 14x.

Though negligible differences in karyotype among Solidago and related genera were found, Solidago taxa with multiple cytotypes are more common than those with one. Although chromosome count is a useful metric for differentiating among Solidago taxa, it may be problematic due to the frequent variation in ploidy levels. Cytogeographic patterns in the Solidago gigantea complex, with tetraploids occurring in eastern North America and hexaploids in Oregon and Washington, were observed. Cytogeographic patterns are also observed in the Solidago canadensis complex: hexaploids within S. canadensis have been observed east of the Great Plains and are treated as Solidago altissima, and diploids and tetraploids occurring in the Great Plains are treated as Solidago gilvocanescens. The taxonomic status of Solidago ptarmicoides created an extensive debate due to frequency hybridization of S. ptarmicoides with members of the Ptarmicoidei section of Solidago. It was asserted that S. ptarmicoides should be united with Solidago rather than the genus Aster due to external morphological features such as similar pappus length as well as the same chromosome base (x=9). Information about chromosome number is still a crucial part of current understanding and phylogenies of Solidago.

== Ecology ==
Goldenrod is considered a keystone species, and has been called the single most important plant for North American pollinator biodiversity. Goldenrod species are used as a food source by the larvae of many Lepidoptera species. As many as 104 species of butterflies and moths use it as a host plant for their larvae, and 42 species of bees are goldenrod specialists, visiting only goldenrod for food. Some lepidopteran larvae bore into plant tissues and form a bulbous tissue mass called a gall around it, upon which the larva then feeds. Various parasitoid wasps find these galls and lay eggs in the larvae, penetrating the bulb with their ovipositors. Woodpeckers are known to peck open the galls and eat the insects in the center.

Goldenrods have become invasive species in many parts of the world outside their native range, including China, Japan, Europe and Africa. Solidago canadensis, which was introduced as a garden plant in Central Europe, has become common in the wild, and in Germany and Norway is considered an invasive species that displaces native vegetation from its natural habitat.

== Use and cultivation ==
Young goldenrod leaves are edible. Traditionally, Native Americans use the seeds of some species for food. Herbal teas are sometimes made with goldenrod.

Goldenrod often is inaccurately said to cause hay fever in humans. The pollen causing this allergic reaction is produced mainly by ragweed (Ambrosia sp.), blooming at the same time as the goldenrod and pollinated by wind. Goldenrod pollen is too heavy and sticky to be blown far from the flowers, and is pollinated mainly by insects. Frequent handling of goldenrod and other flowers, however, can cause allergic reactions, sometimes irritating enough to force florists to change occupation. Goldenrods are attractive sources of nectar for bees, flies, wasps, and butterflies. Honey from goldenrods often is dark and strong because of admixtures of other nectars. However, when honey flow is strong, a light (often water-clear), spicy-tasting monofloral honey is produced. While the bees are ripening the honey produced from goldenrods, it has a rank odour and taste; the finished honey is much milder.

Goldenrods are, in some places, considered a sign of good luck or good fortune.

Goldenrods are used to make yellow dyes and lake pigments.

=== Cultivated species ===
Cultivated goldenrods include S. bicolor, S. caesia, S. canadensis, S. cutleri, S. riddellii, S. rigida, S. shortii, and S. virgaurea.

A number of cultivars have been selected, including several of hybrid origin. A putative hybrid with aster, known as ×Solidaster is less unruly, with pale yellow flowers, equally suitable for dried arrangements. Molecular and other evidence points to ×Solidaster (at least the cultivar 'Lemore') being a hybrid of Solidago ptarmicoides and Solidago canadensis, the former now in Solidago, but likely the "aster" in question.

The cultivars 'Goldenmosa' and S. × luteus 'Lemore' have gained the Royal Horticultural Society's Award of Garden Merit.

=== Industrial use ===
Inventor Thomas Edison experimented with goldenrod to produce rubber, which it contains naturally. Edison created a fertilization and cultivation process to maximize the rubber content in each plant. His experiments produced a 12 ft-tall (3.7 m) plant that yielded as much as 12% rubber, and the new variant was named Solidago edisoni, also called Solidago edisoniana. The tires on the Model T given to him by his friend Henry Ford were made from goldenrod. Like George Washington Carver, Henry Ford was deeply interested in the regenerative properties of soil and the potential of alternative crops such as peanuts and soybeans to produce plastics, paint, fuel and other products.

Ford had long believed that the world would eventually need a substitute for gasoline, and supported the production of ethanol (or grain alcohol) as an alternative fuel. In 1942, he would showcase a car with a lightweight plastic body made from soybeans. Ford and Carver began corresponding via letter in 1934, and their mutual admiration deepened after George Washington Carver made a visit to Michigan in 1937. As Douglas Brinkley writes in Wheels for the World, his history of Ford, the automaker donated generously to the Tuskegee Institute, helping finance Carver's experiments, and Carver in turn spent a period of time helping to oversee crops at the Ford plantation in Ways, Georgia.

By the time World War II began, Ford had made repeated journeys to Tuskegee to convince George Washington Carver to come to Dearborn and help him develop a synthetic rubber to help compensate for wartime rubber shortages. Carver arrived on July 19, 1942, and set up a laboratory in an old water works building in Dearborn. He and Ford experimented with different crops, including sweet potatoes and dandelions, eventually devising a way to make the rubber substitute from goldenrod, a plant weed commercially viable. Carver died in January 1943, Ford in April 1947, but the relationship between their two institutions continued to flourish: As recently as the late 1990s, Ford awarded grants of $4 million over two years to the George Washington Carver School at Tuskegee.

Extensive process development was conducted during World War II to commercialize goldenrod as a source of rubber. The rubber is only contained in the leaves, not the stems or blooms. Typical rubber content of the leaves is 7%. The resulting rubber is of low molecular weight, resulting in an excessively tacky compound with poor tensile properties.

=== Traditional medicine ===
Solidago virgaurea is used in a traditional kidney tonic by practitioners of herbal medicine to counter inflammation and irritation caused by bacterial infections or kidney stones. Goldenrod is also used in some formulas for cleansing of the kidney or bladder during a healing fast, in conjunction with potassium broth and specific juices. Some Native American cultures traditionally chew the leaves to relieve sore throats, and the roots to relieve toothaches.

=== Medicinal exploration ===
In various assessments by the European Medicines Agency with respect to Solidago virgaurea, non-clinical data shows diuretic, anti-inflammatory, antioxidant, analgesic and spasmolytic, antibacterial, antifungal, anticancer and immunomodulatory activity. However, as no single ingredient is responsible for these effects, the whole herbal preparation of Solidago inflorescences must be considered as the active ingredient.

== Cultural significance ==
The goldenrod is the state flower of the U.S. states of Kentucky (adopted 1926) and Nebraska (adopted 1895). Solidago altissima, tall goldenrod, was named the state wildflower of South Carolina in 2003. The sweet goldenrod (Solidago odora) is the state herb of Delaware. Goldenrod was the state flower of Alabama, but it was later rejected in favor of the camellia.

== Diversity ==
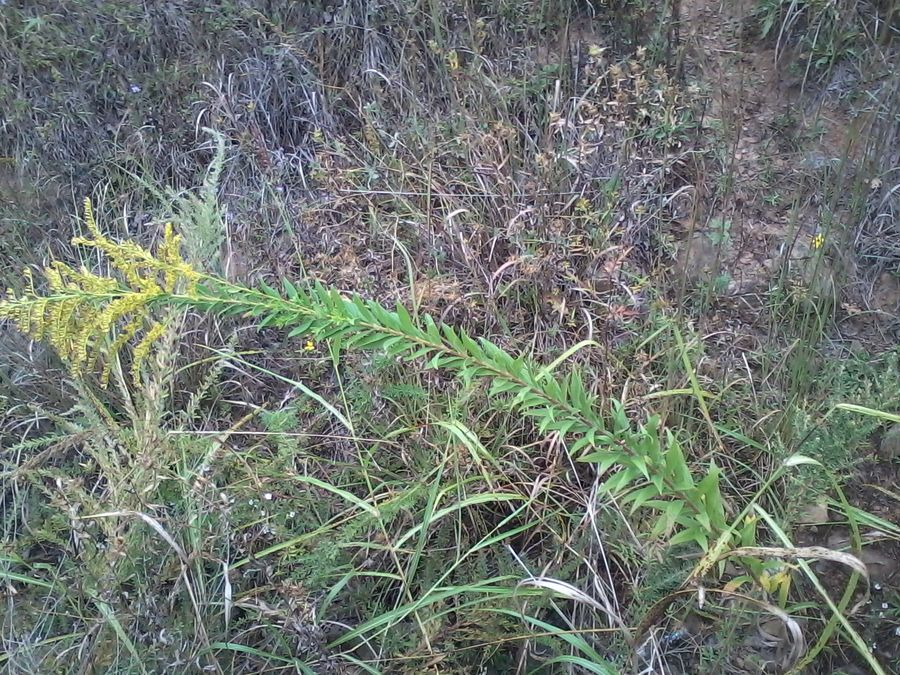

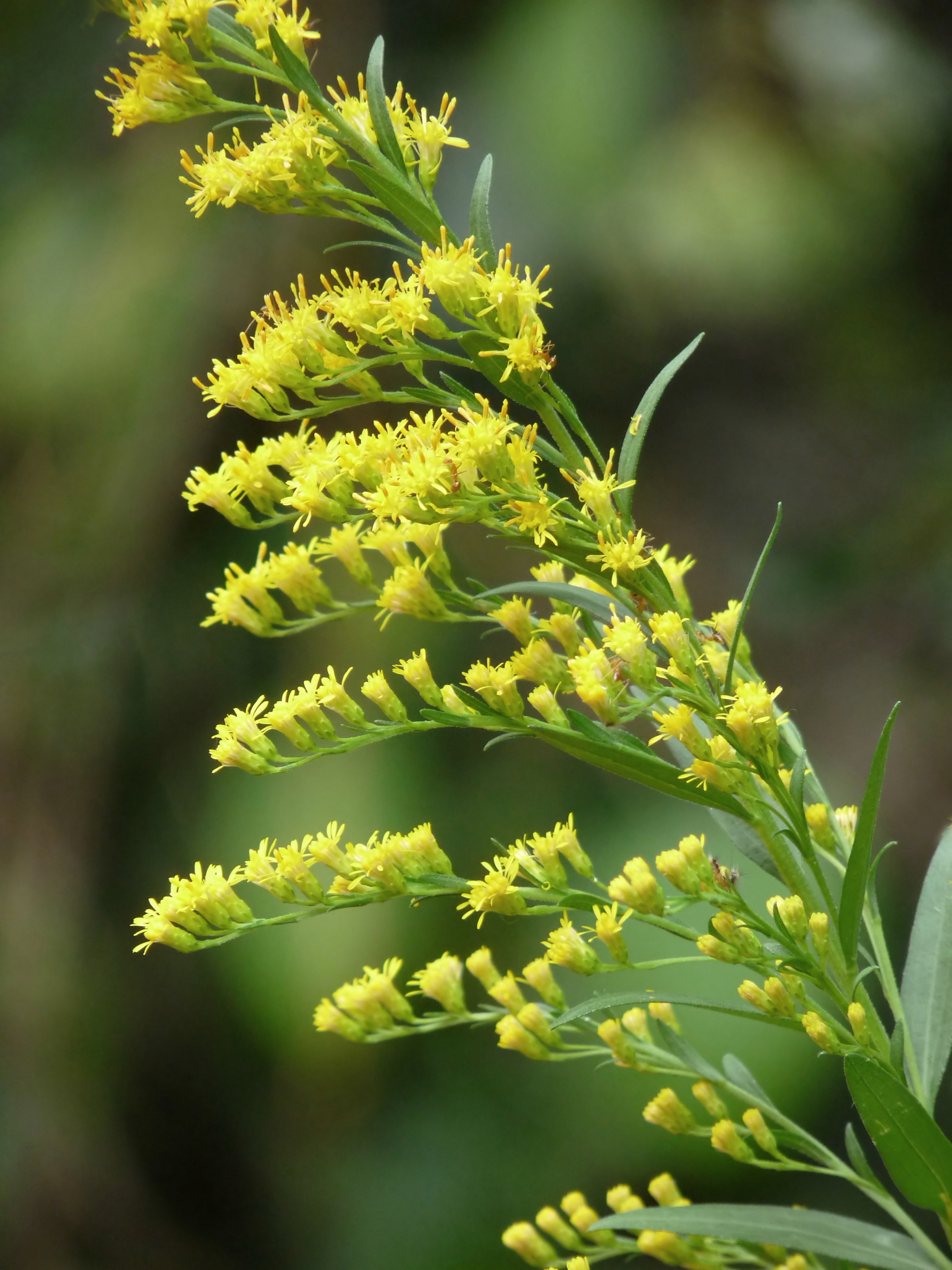
Solidago canadensis in Kerala

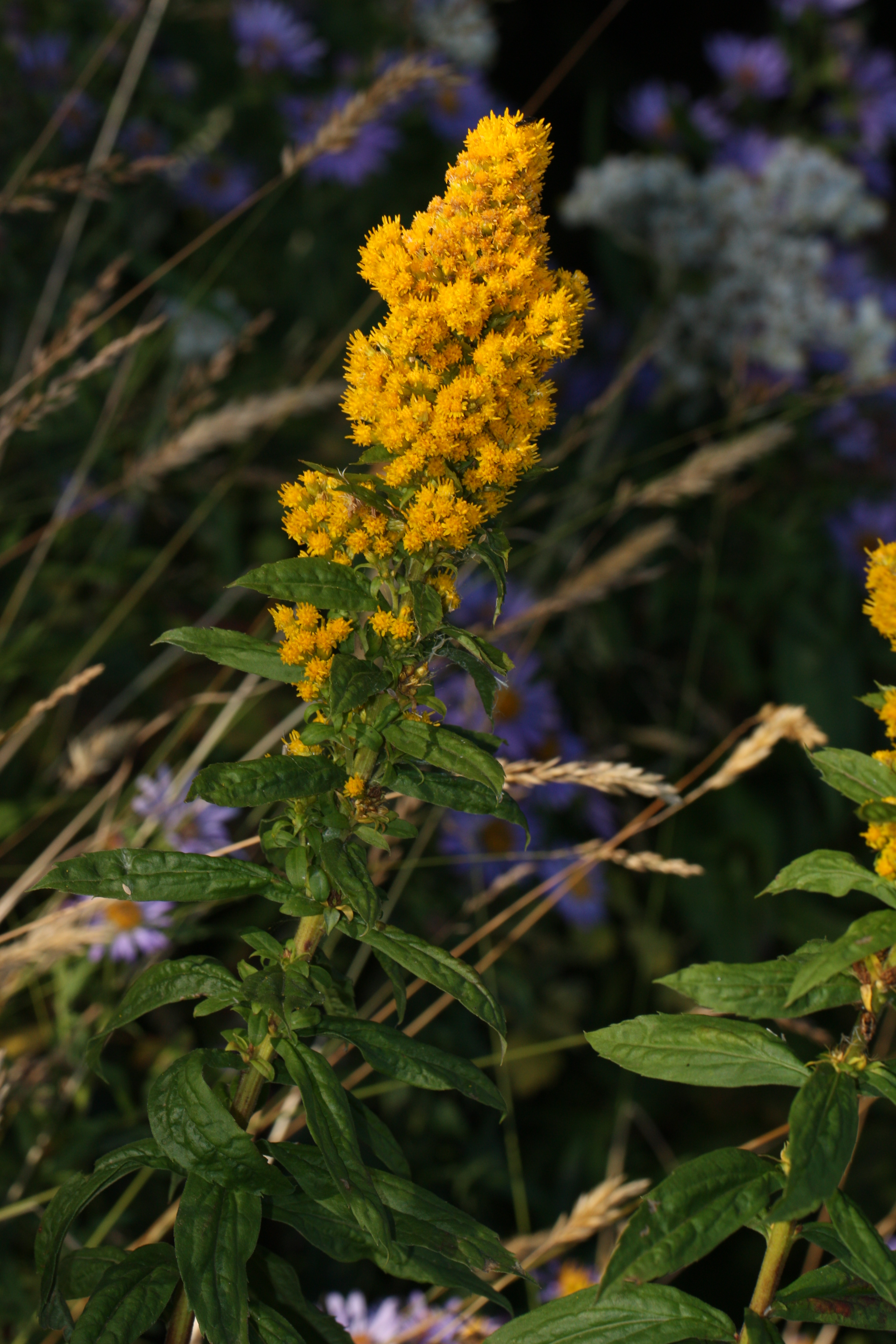
Solidago lepida

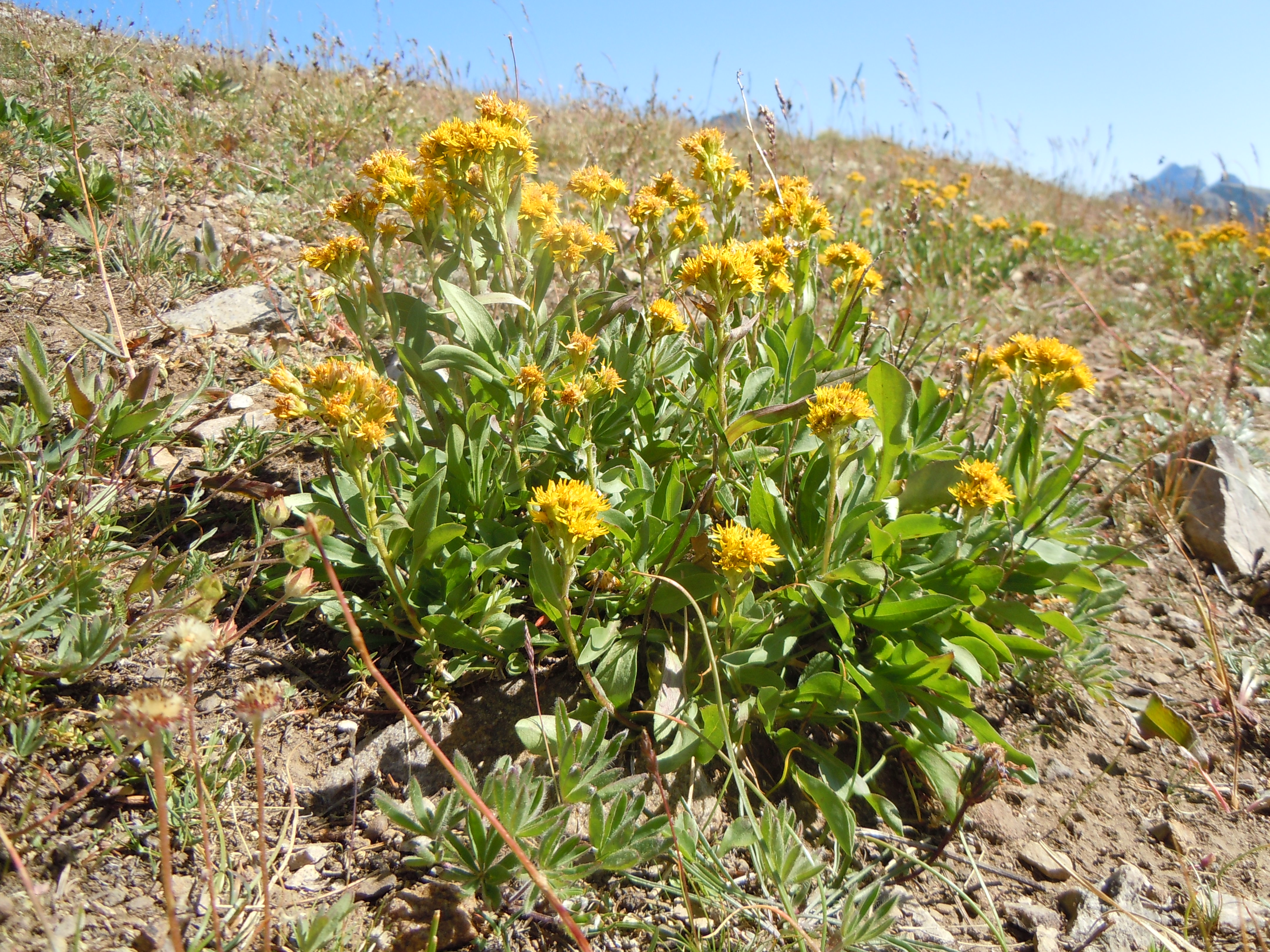
Solidago multiradiata

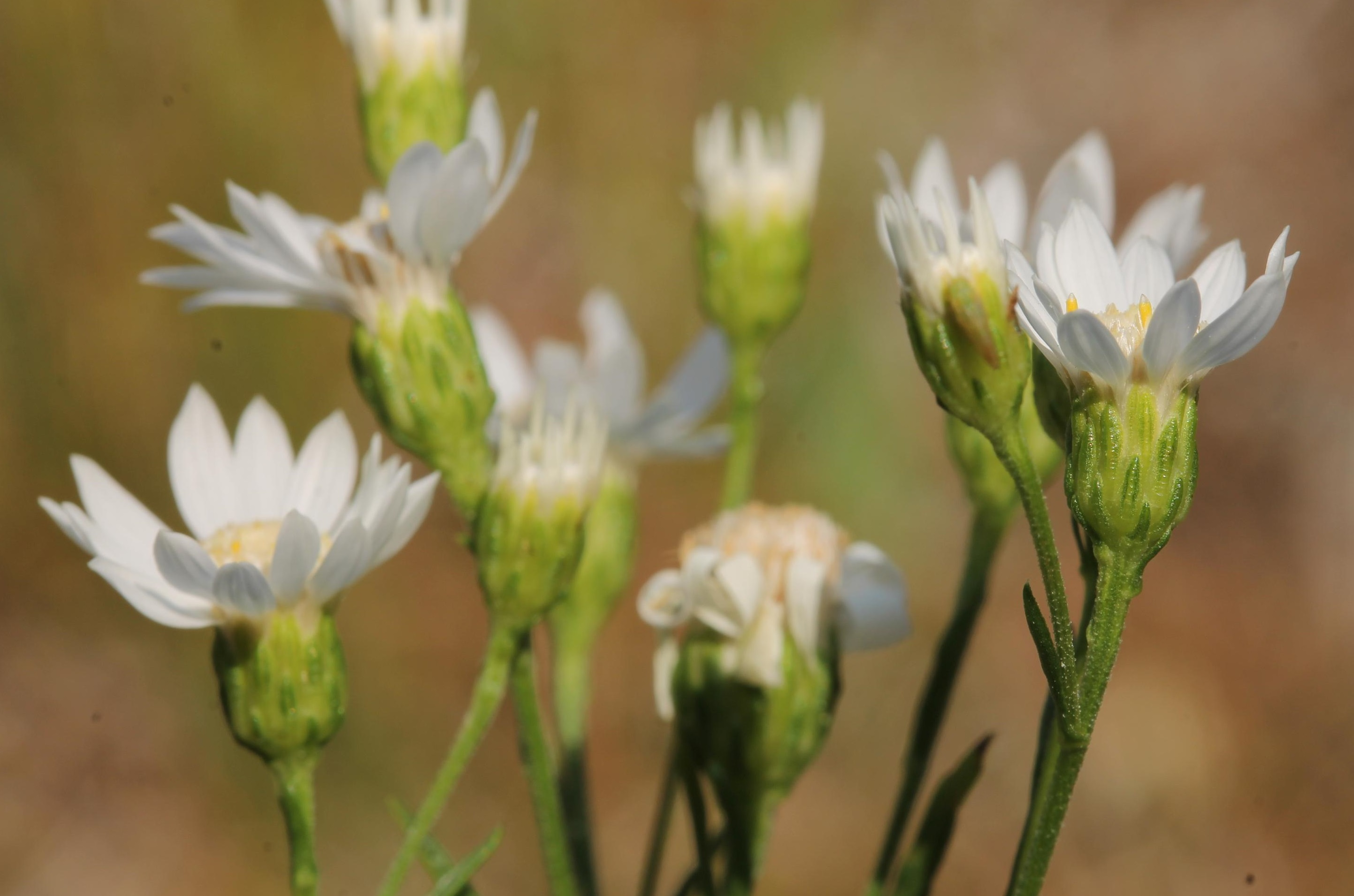
Solidago ptarmicoides

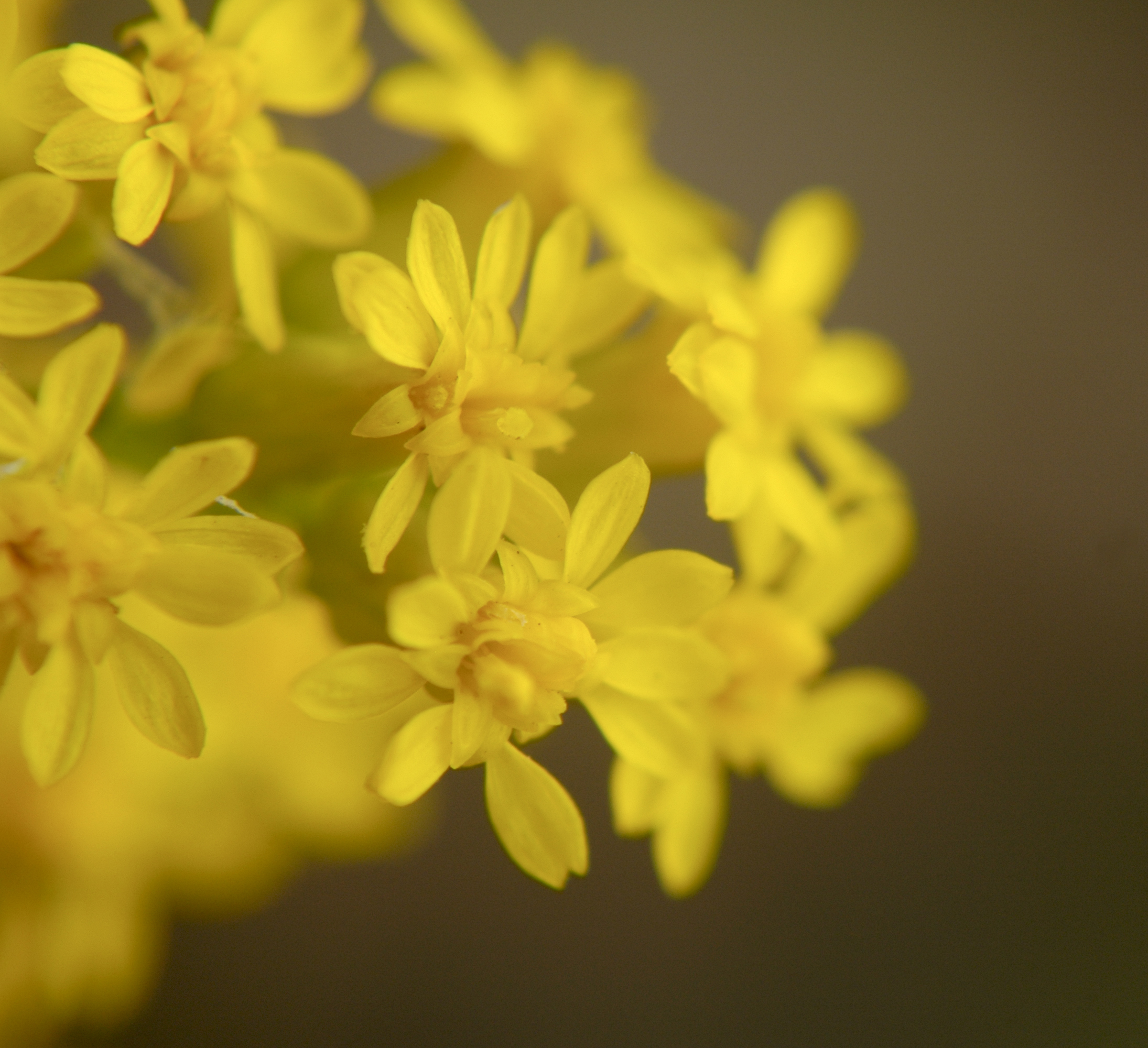
Solidago nemoralis

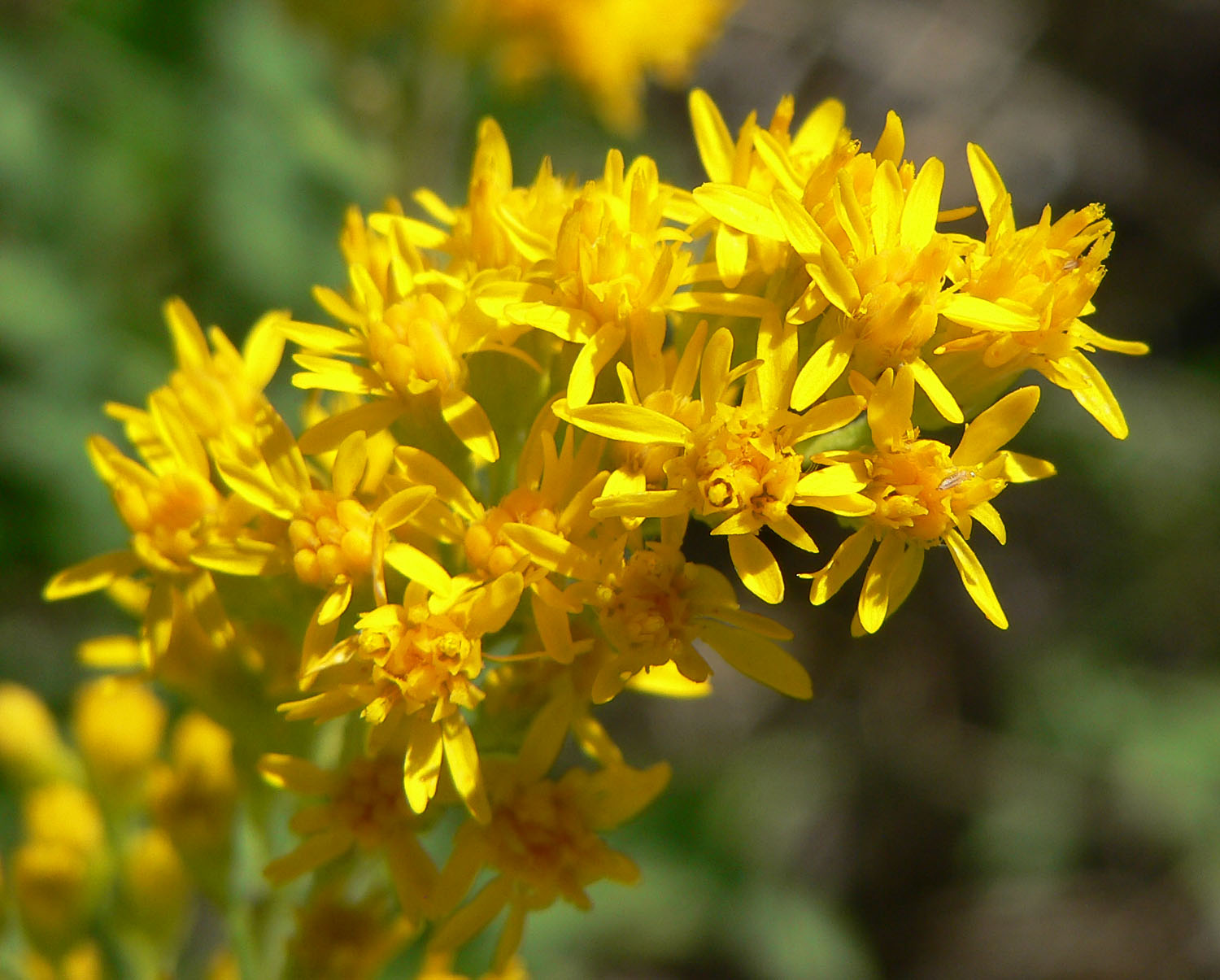
Solidago velutina ssp. sparsiflora

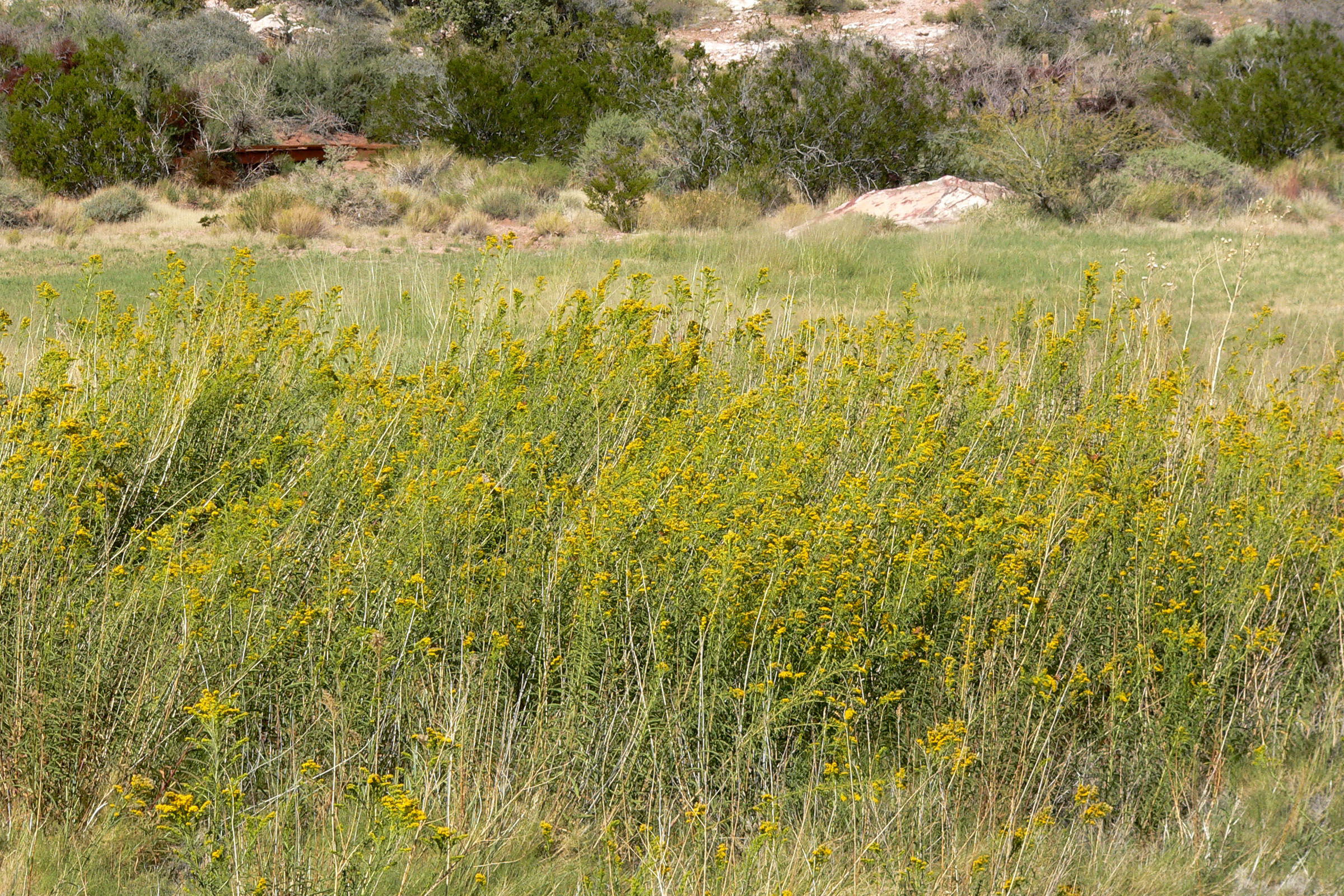
Solidago spectabilis

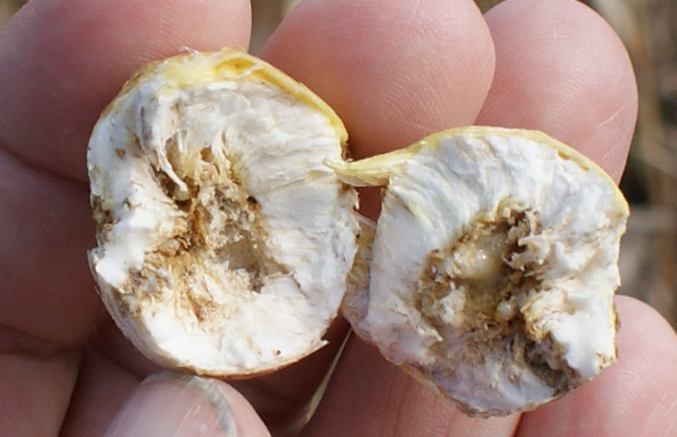
Gall formed in Solidago sp. by the fly Eurosta solidaginis

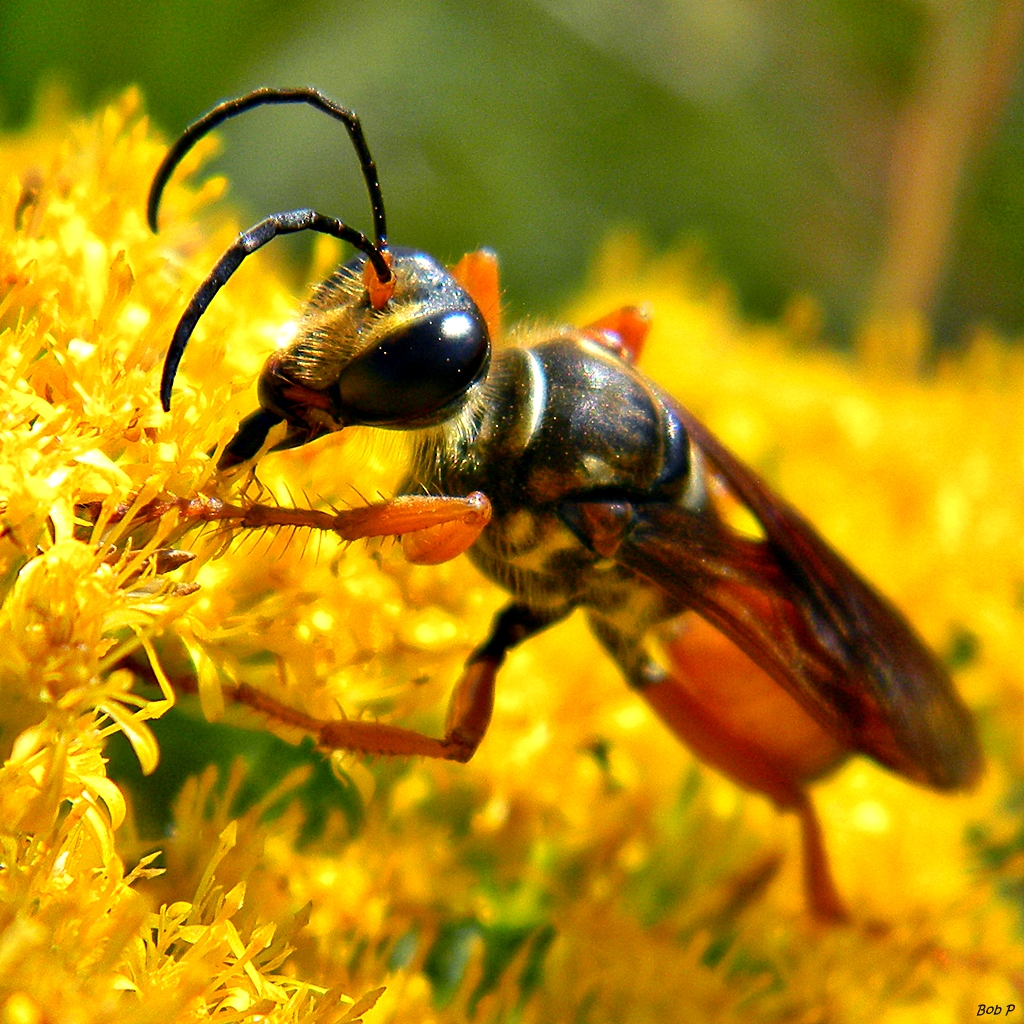
Solidago sp. with digger wasp Sphex ichneumoneus

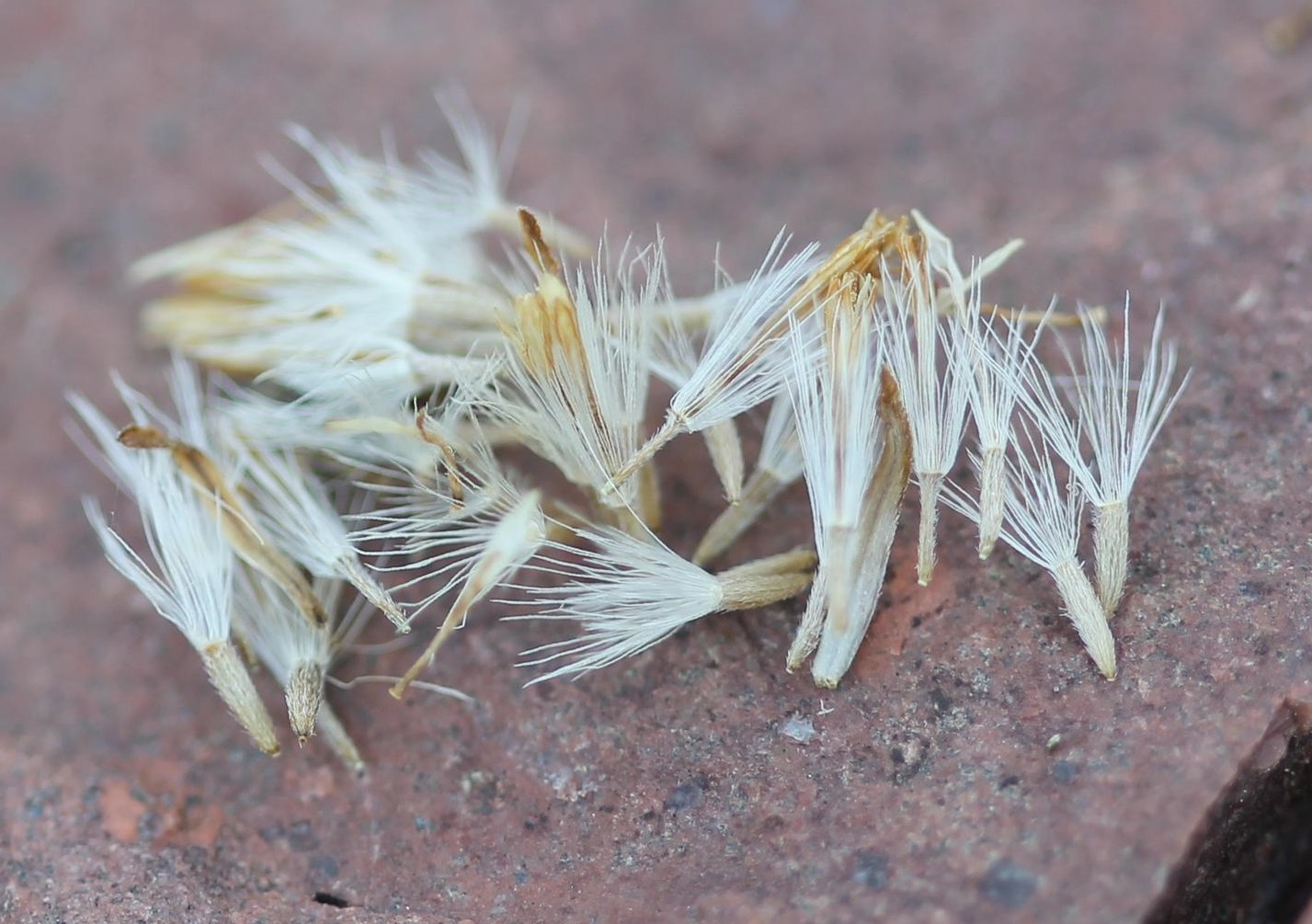
Fruits of Solidago simplex

=== Accepted species ===
- Solidago albopilosa E.L.Braun – whitehair goldenrod
- Solidago altiplanities C.E.S. Taylor & R.J.Taylor – high plains goldenrod
- Solidago altissima L. – Canada goldenrod, late goldenrod
- Solidago amplexicaulis Torr. & A.Gray
- Solidago arenicola B.R. Keener & Kral – southern racemose goldenrod
- Solidago argentinensis López Laphitz, Rita María & Semple
- Solidago arguta Ait. – Atlantic goldenrod, forest goldenrod, toothed goldenrod, cut-leaf goldenrod
- Solidago aurea Spreng.
- Solidago auriculata Shuttlw. ex Blake – eared goldenrod, clasping goldenrod
- Solidago bartramiana Fernald
- Solidago bicolor L. – white goldenrod, silverrod
- Solidago brachyphylla Chapman – Dixie goldenrod
- Solidago brendiae Semple
- Solidago buckleyi Torr. & Gray – Buckley's goldenrod
- Solidago caesia L. – wreath goldenrod, axillary goldenrod, bluestem goldenrod, woodland goldenrod
- Solidago calcicola (Fernald) Fernald
- Solidago californica Nutt. – California goldenrod
- Solidago canadensis L. – Canada goldenrod, Canadian goldenrod, common goldenrod
- Solidago capulinensis Cockerell & Andrews L. – Capulin goldenrod
- Solidago chilensis Meyen
- Solidago compacta Turcz.
- Solidago confinis A.Gray
- Solidago coreana (Nakai) H.S.Pak
- Solidago correllii Semple L. – Guadalupe Mountains goldenrod
- Solidago curtisii Torr. & A.Gray – mountain decumbent goldenrod, Curtis' goldenrod
- Solidago dahurica (Kitagawa) Kitagawa ex Juzepczuk
- Solidago decurrens Loureiro
- Solidago delicatula Small – elmleaf goldenrod, smooth elm-leaf goldenrod
- Solidago drummondii Torr. & A.Gray. – Drummond's goldenrod
- Solidago durangensis G.L.Nesom
- Solidago elongata Nutt. – West Coast Canada goldenrod, Cascade Canada goldenrod
- Solidago erecta Nutt. – showy goldenrod, slender goldenrod
- Solidago ericamerioides G.L.Nesom
- Solidago faucibus Wieboldt – gorge goldenrod
- Solidago fistulosa P.Mill. – pine-barren goldenrod
- Solidago flexicaulis L. – zigzag goldenrod, broadleaf goldenrod
- Solidago gattingeri Chapman – Gattinger's goldenrod
- Solidago gigantea Ait. – giant goldenrod, tall goldenrod, early goldenrod, smooth goldenrod
- Solidago glabra Desf.
- Solidago glomerata Michx. – clustered goldenrod, skunk goldenrod
- Solidago guiradonis A.Gray – Guirado's goldenrod
- Solidago gypsophila G.L.Nesom
- Solidago hintoniorum G.L.Nesom
- Solidago hispida Muhl. ex Willd. – hairy goldenrod
- Solidago houghtonii Torr. & A.Gray ex A.Gray – Houghton's goldenrod
- Solidago humilis Mill.
- Solidago inornata Lunell
- Solidago juliae G.L.Nesom – Julia's goldenrod
- Solidago juncea Ait. – early goldenrod
- Solidago kralii Semple – Kral's goldenrod
- Solidago kuhistanica Juz.
- Solidago kurilensis Juz.
- Solidago lancifolia Torr. & A.Gray – lance-leaf goldenrod
- Solidago latissimifolia P.Mill. – Elliott's goldenrod
- Solidago leavenworthii Torr. & A.Gray – Leavenworth's goldenrod
- Solidago leiocarpa DC. in DC. &. A.DC. – Cutler's alpine goldenrod
- Solidago lepida DC. – western Canada goldenrod
- Solidago ludoviciana (Gray) Small – Louisiana goldenrod
- Solidago macrophylla Pursh – largeleaf goldenrod
- Solidago macvaughii G.L.Nesom
- Solidago microglossa DC.
- Solidago minutissima (Makino) Kitam.
- Solidago missouriensis Nutt. – Missouri goldenrod, prairie goldenrod, Tolmie's goldenrod
- Solidago mollis Bartl. – velvety goldenrod, soft goldenrod, woolly goldenrod
- Solidago multiradiata Ait. – Rocky Mountain goldenrod, alpine goldenrod, northern goldenrod, manyray goldenrod
- Solidago nana Nutt. – baby goldenrod, dwarf goldenrod, gray goldenrod
- Solidago nemoralis Ait. – gray goldenrod, dyersweed goldenrod, old-field goldenrod
- Solidago nitida Torr. & A.Gray – shiny goldenrod
- Solidago odora Ait. – anise-scented goldenrod, sweet goldenrod, fragrant goldenrod
- Solidago ohioensis Riddell – Ohio goldenrod
- Solidago orientalis G.L.Nesom
- Solidago ouachitensis C.E.S.Taylor & R.J.Taylor – Ouachita Mountains goldenrod
- Solidago ovata Friesner
- Solidago pacifica Juzepczuk
- Solidago paniculata DC.
- Solidago patagonica Phil.
- Solidago patula Muhl. ex Willd. – roundleaf goldenrod, roughleaf goldenrod
- Solidago petiolaris Ait. – downy ragged goldenrod
- Solidago perornata Lunell
- Solidago pilosa Mill.
- Solidago pinetorum Small – Small's goldenrod
- Solidago plumosa Small – plumed goldenrod, plumose goldenrod, Yadkin River goldenrod
- Solidago pringlei Fernald
- Solidago procera Aiton
- Solidago ptarmicoides (Torr. & A.Gray) B.Boivin – white flat-top goldenrod, upland white aster
- Solidago puberula Nutt. – downy goldenrod
- Solidago pulchra Small – Carolina goldenrod
- Solidago radula Nutt. – western rough goldenrod
- Solidago riddellii Frank ex Riddell – Riddell's goldenrod
- Solidago rigida L. – rigid goldenrod, stiff-leaf goldenrod
- Solidago roanensis Porter – Roan Mountain goldenrod
- Solidago rugosa P.Mill. – wrinkleleaf goldenrod, rough-stemmed goldenrod
- Solidago rupestris Raf. – rock goldenrod
- Solidago satanica Lunell
- Solidago sciaphila Steele – shadowy goldenrod
- Solidago sempervirens L. – seaside goldenrod, salt-marsh goldenrod
- Solidago serotina Retz.
- Solidago shortii Torr. & A.Gray – Short's goldenrod
- Solidago simplex Kunth : Mt. Albert goldenrod, sticky goldenrod
- Solidago spathulata DC. – coast goldenrod
- Solidago speciosa Nutt. – showy goldenrod, noble goldenrod
- Solidago spectabilis (D.C.Eat.) A.Gray – Nevada goldenrod, basin goldenrod
- Solidago sphacelata Raf. – autumn goldenrod, false goldenrod
- Solidago spithamaea M.A.Curtis – Blue Ridge goldenrod, skunk goldenrod
- Solidago spiraeifolia Fisch. ex Herder
- Solidago squarrosa Nutt. – stout goldenrod
- Solidago stricta Ait. – wand goldenrod, willow-leaf goldenrod
- Solidago tarda Mack. – Atlantic goldenrod
- Solidago tortifolia Ell. – twistleaf goldenrod
- Solidago uliginosa Nutt. – bog goldenrod, fall goldenrod
- Solidago ulmifolia Muhl. ex Willd. – elmleaf goldenrod
- Solidago velutina DC. – threenerve goldenrod, velvety goldenrod
- Solidago verna M.A.Curtis – springflowering goldenrod
- Solidago villosicarpa LeBlond – glandular wand goldenrod, hairy-seed goldenrod
- Solidago virgaurea L. – European goldenrod
- Solidago vossii J.S.Pringle & Laureto – Voss's goldenrod
- Solidago wrightii A.Gray – Wright's goldenrod
- Solidago yokusaiana Makino

=== Natural hybrids ===
- Solidago × asperula Desf. (S. rugosa × S. sempervirens)
- Solidago × beaudryi Boivin (S. rugosa × S. uliginosa)
- Solidago × calcicola (Fernald) Fernald – limestone goldenrod
- Solidago × erskinei Boivin (S. canadensis × S. sempervirens)
- Solidago × niederederi Khek (S. canadensis × S. virgaurea)
- Solidago × ovata Friesner (S. sphacelata × S. ulmifolia)
- Solidago × ulmicaesia Friesner (S. caesia × S. ulmifolia)

=== Formerly included ===
Numerous species formerly considered members of Solidago are now regarded as better suited to other genera, including Brintonia, Duhaldea, Euthamia, Gundlachia, Inula, Jacobaea, Leptostelma, Olearia, Psiadia, Senecio, Sphagneticola, Symphyotrichum, and Trixis.
