= List of Neolasioptera species =

This is a list of 134 species in Neolasioptera, a genus of gall midges in the family Cecidomyiidae.

== Neolasioptera species ==
- Neolasioptera aeschynomensis Br Fthes, 1918^{c g}
- Neolasioptera albipes Felt, 1918^{i c g}
- Neolasioptera albitarsis (Felt, 1907)^{i c g}
- Neolasioptera albolineata Felt, 1908^{i c g}
- Neolasioptera allioniae (Felt, 1911)^{i c g b}
- Neolasioptera amaranthi Mohn, 1964^{c g}
- Neolasioptera ambrosiae Felt, 1909^{i c g}
- Neolasioptera angelicae (Beutenmuller, 1908)^{i c g}
- Neolasioptera aphelandrae Mohn, 1964^{c g}
- Neolasioptera apocyni (Felt, 1921)^{i c g}
- Neolasioptera argentata Brèthes, 1917^{c g}
- Neolasioptera argentisquama (Felt, 1908)^{i c g}
- Neolasioptera asclepiae Felt, 1908^{i c g}
- Neolasioptera baccharicola Gagne, 1971^{i c g}
- Neolasioptera baezi Brèthes, 1922^{c g}
- Neolasioptera boehmeriae (Beutenmuller, 1908)^{i c g b}
- Neolasioptera borreriae Mohn, 1964^{c g}
- Neolasioptera brevis Gagne, 1984^{i c g}
- Neolasioptera brickelliae Mohn, 1964^{c g}
- Neolasioptera caleae Mohn, 1964^{c g}
- Neolasioptera camarae Mohn, 1964^{c g}
- Neolasioptera capsici Mohn, 1964^{c g}
- Neolasioptera cassiae (Felt, 1909)^{i c g}
- Neolasioptera caulicola (Felt, 1907)^{i c g}
- Neolasioptera celastri Felt, 1908^{i c g}
- Neolasioptera celtis Mohn, 1964^{c g}
- Neolasioptera cestri Mohn, 1964^{c g}
- Neolasioptera cimmaronensis Mohn, 1975^{c g}
- Neolasioptera cinerea (Felt, 1907)^{i c g}
- Neolasioptera cissampeli Mohn, 1964^{c g}
- Neolasioptera clematicola Mohn, 1964^{c g}
- Neolasioptera clematidis (Felt, 1907)^{i c g b}
- Neolasioptera combreti Mohn, 1964^{c g}
- Neolasioptera compositarum Mohn, 1964^{c g}
- Neolasioptera compostarum Mohn, 1964^{c g}
- Neolasioptera convolvuli (Felt, 1907)^{i c g b}
- Neolasioptera cordiae Mohn, 1964^{c g}
- Neolasioptera cornicola (Beutenmuller, 1907)^{i c g b}
- Neolasioptera crotalariae (Stebbins, 1910)^{i c g}
- Neolasioptera cruttwellae Gagne, 1977^{c g}
- Neolasioptera cuphae Gagne, 1998^{c g}
- Neolasioptera cupheae Gagne, 1998^{c g}
- Neolasioptera cusani Wunsch, 1979^{c g}
- Neolasioptera dentata Mohn, 1964^{c g}
- Neolasioptera desmodii (Felt, 1907)^{i c g b}
- Neolasioptera diclipterae Wunsch, 1979^{c g}
- Neolasioptera diplaci (Felt, 1912)^{i c g}
- Neolasioptera donamae Wunsch, 1979^{c g}
- Neolasioptera eregeroni (Brodie, 1894)^{i c g}
- Neolasioptera erigeroni Brodie, 1894^{c g}
- Neolasioptera erigerontis (Felt, 1907)^{i c}
- Neolasioptera erythroxyli Mohn, 1964^{c g}
- Neolasioptera eugeniae Maia, 1993^{c g}
- Neolasioptera eupatoriflorae (Felt, 1907)^{i c g}
- Neolasioptera eupatorii (Felt, 1907)^{i c g b}
- Neolasioptera exeupatorii Gagne, 1994^{c g}
- Neolasioptera exigua Mohn, 1964^{c g}
- Neolasioptera fariae (Tavares, 1922)^{c g}
- Neolasioptera farinosa (Osten Sacken, 1862)^{i c g b}
- Neolasioptera ferrata Mohn, 1964^{c g}
- Neolasioptera flavomaculata Felt, 1908^{i c g}
- Neolasioptera fontagrensis Gagne^{i c g}
- Neolasioptera fraxinifolia (Felt, 1908)^{i c g}
- Neolasioptera frugivora Gagne, 1977^{c g}
- Neolasioptera galeopsidis (Felt, 1909)^{i c g}
- Neolasioptera grandis Mohn, 1964^{c g}
- Neolasioptera hamamelidis (Felt, 1907)^{i c g}
- Neolasioptera helianthi (Felt, 1907)^{i c g}
- Neolasioptera heliocarpi Mohn, 1964^{c g}
- Neolasioptera hibisci (Felt, 1907)^{i c g}
- Neolasioptera hirsuta Felt, 1908^{i c g}
- Neolasioptera hyptis Mohn, 1964^{c g}
- Neolasioptera impatientifolia (Felt, 1907)^{i c g b}
- Neolasioptera incisa Plakidas, 1994^{c g b}
- Neolasioptera indigoferae Mohn, 1964^{c g}
- Neolasioptera ingae Mohn, 1964^{c g}
- Neolasioptera iresinis Mohn, 1964^{c g}
- Neolasioptera lantanae (Tavares, 1922)^{c g}
- Neolasioptera lapalmae Mohn, 1964^{c g}
- Neolasioptera lathami Gagne, 1971^{i c g}
- Neolasioptera linderae (Beutenmuller, 1907)^{i c g}
- Neolasioptera lupini (Felt, 1908)^{i c g}
- Neolasioptera lycopi (Felt, 1907)^{i c g b}
- Neolasioptera major Felt, 1918^{i c g}
- Neolasioptera malvavisci Mohn, 1975^{c g}
- Neolasioptera martelli Nijveldt, 1967^{i c g}
- Neolasioptera melantherae Mohn, 1964^{c g}
- Neolasioptera menthae Felt, 1909^{i c g}
- Neolasioptera merremiae Mohn, 1964^{c g}
- Neolasioptera mimuli Felt, 1908^{i c g}
- Neolasioptera mincae Wunsch, 1979^{c g}
- Neolasioptera mitchellae (Felt, 1908)^{i c g}
- Neolasioptera monardi (Brodie, 1894)^{i c g b}
- Neolasioptera murtfeldtiana ^{i g}
- Neolasioptera neofusca (Felt, 1908)^{i c g}
- Neolasioptera nodulosa (Beutenmuller, 1907)^{i c g b} (nodular stem gall midge)
- Neolasioptera odontonemae Mohn, 1964^{c g}
- Neolasioptera olivae Wunsch, 1979^{c g}
- Neolasioptera palmeri (Felt, 1925)^{i c g}
- Neolasioptera palustris (Felt, 1907)^{i c g}
- Neolasioptera parvula Mohn, 1964^{c g}
- Neolasioptera perfoliata (Felt, 1907)^{i c g b}
- Neolasioptera phaseoli Mohn, 1975^{c g}
- Neolasioptera pierrei Gagne, 1972^{i c g}
- Neolasioptera portulacae (Cook, 1906)^{i}
- Neolasioptera potentillaecaulis (Stebbins, 1910)^{i g}
- Neolasioptera psederae (Felt, 1934)^{i}
- Neolasioptera pseudocalymmae Mohn, 1964^{c g}
- Neolasioptera punicei (Brodie, 1909)^{i c g}
- Neolasioptera quercina (Felt, 1907)^{i c g}
- Neolasioptera ramuscula (Beutenmuller, 1907)^{i c g}
- Neolasioptera riparia (Felt, 1909)^{c g}
- Neolasioptera rostrata Gagne, 1989^{i c g}
- Neolasioptera rudbeckiae (Felt, 1908)^{i c g}
- Neolasioptera salvadorensis Mohn, 1964^{c g}
- Neolasioptera salviae Mohn, 1964^{c g}
- Neolasioptera samariae Wunsch, 1979^{c g}
- Neolasioptera senecionis Mohn, 1964^{c g}
- Neolasioptera serrata Mohn, 1964^{c g}
- Neolasioptera sidae Mohn, 1964^{c g}
- Neolasioptera spinulae (Felt, 1908)^{i c g}
- Neolasioptera tertia (Cockerell, 1898)^{i c g}
- Neolasioptera thurstoni (Brodie, 1894)^{i c g}
- Neolasioptera tournefortiae Mohn, 1964^{c g}
- Neolasioptera triadenii (Beutenmuller, 1908)^{i c g}
- Neolasioptera tribulae Wunsch, 1979^{c g}
- Neolasioptera variipalpus (Mani, 1937)^{c g}
- Neolasioptera verbenae (Feltm, 1912)^{i c g}
- Neolasioptera verbesinae Mohn, 1964^{c g}
- Neolasioptera vernoniae (Beutenmuller, 1907)^{i c g b}
- Neolasioptera vernoniensis Mohn, 1964^{c g}
- Neolasioptera viburnicola (Beutenmuller, 1907)^{i c g}
- Neolasioptera vitinea (Felt, 1907)^{i c g b}
- Neolasioptera willistoni (Cockerell, 1898)^{i c g b}

Data sources: i = ITIS, c = Catalogue of Life, g = GBIF, b = Bugguide.net
