= Prairie goldenrod =

Prairie goldenrod is a common name for several plants and may refer to:

- Solidago missouriensis, native to Canada, the United States, and northern Mexico;
- Solidago nemoralis, native to Canada and the United States;
- Solidago ptarmicoides;
- Solidago rigida.
