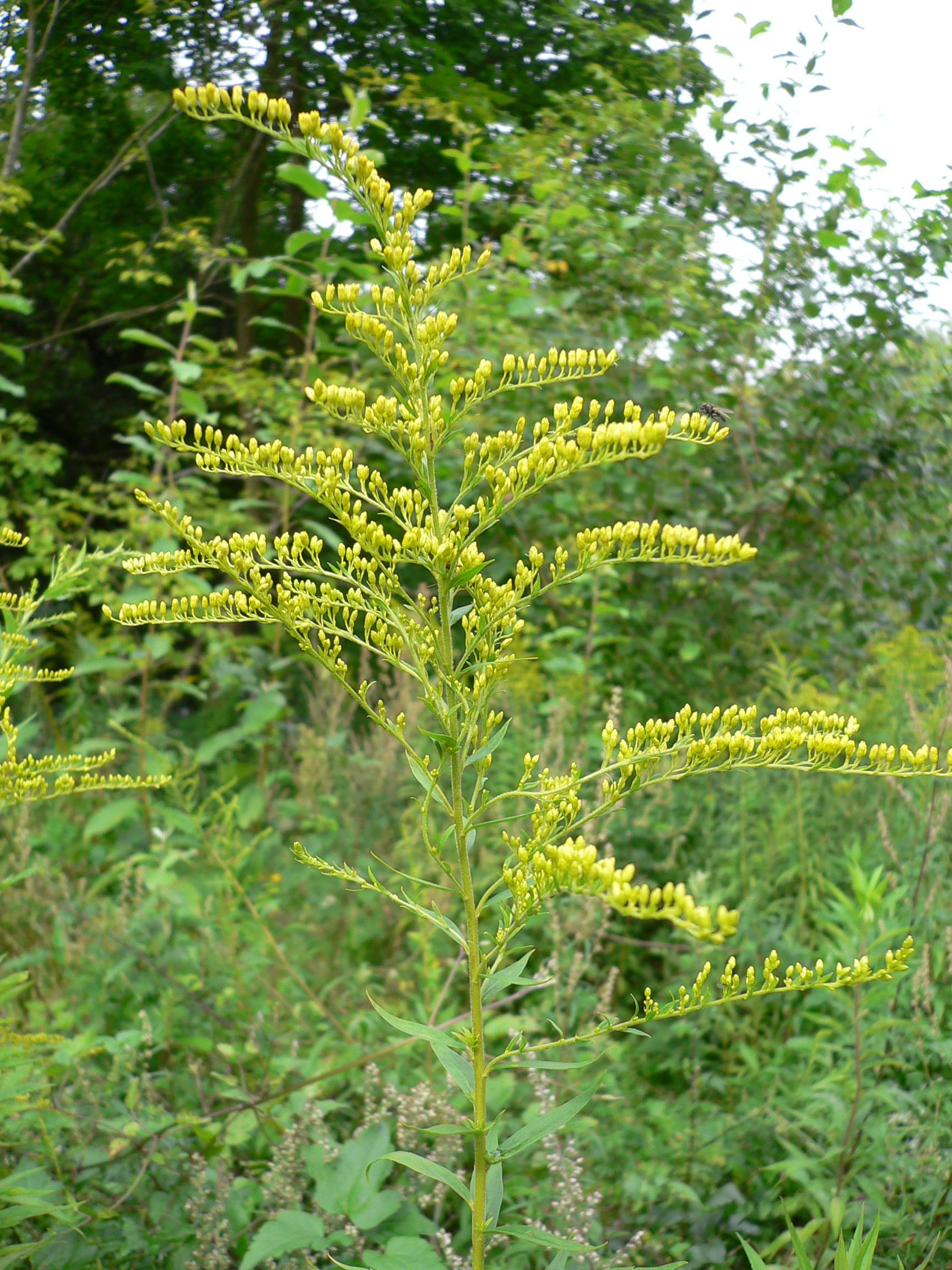

Conservation status
- Secure (NatureServe)

Scientific classification
- Kingdom: Plantae
- Clade: Tracheophytes
- Clade: Angiosperms
- Clade: Eudicots
- Clade: Asterids
- Order: Asterales
- Family: Asteraceae
- Genus: Solidago
- Species: S. canadensis

Binomial name
- Solidago canadensis L.

Synonyms
- Aster canadensis (L.) Kuntze; Doria canadensis (L.) Lunell

= Solidago canadensis =

Species of flowering plant

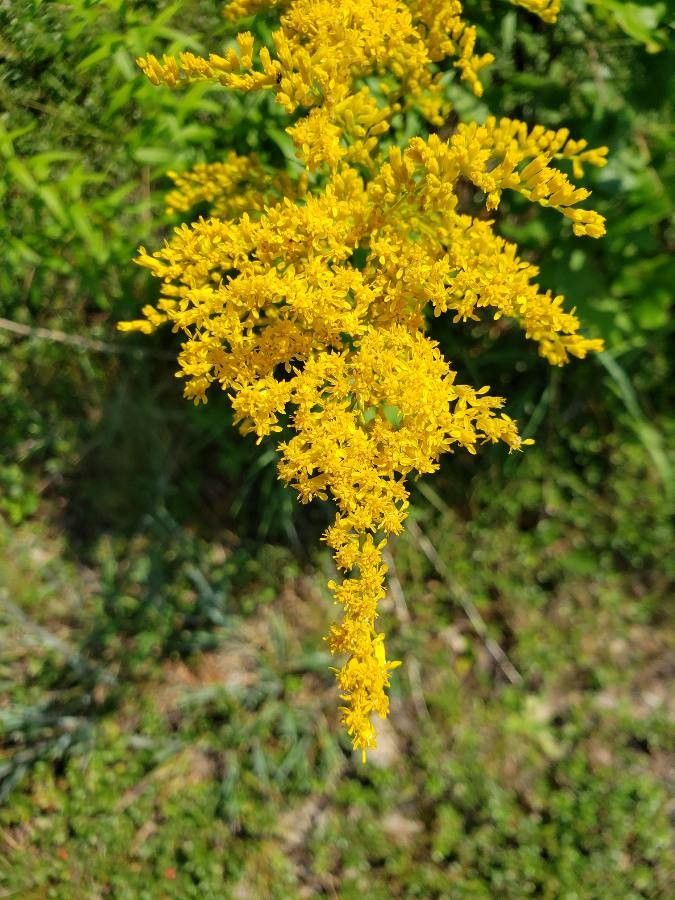
Inflorescence in bloom

Solidago canadensis, known as Canada goldenrod or Canadian goldenrod, is an herbaceous perennial plant of the family Asteraceae. It forms colonies of upright growing plants, with many small yellow flowers in a branching inflorescence held above the foliage. It is native to northeastern and north-central North America and is an invasive plant in other parts of the continent and several areas worldwide, including Eurasia.

== Description ==
Solidago canadensis is a herbaceous perennial plant with stems that grow 2–4 feet (60–120 centimeters) and sometimes to 6 ft (180 cm) tall. It has a wide distribution with several varieties, which have significant variability. The lanceolate to broadly linear shaped leaves are alternately arranged on the stems. The leaves are 4–6 inches (10–15 centimeters) long and 1 in (2.5 cm) wide. The stems have lines of white hairs, while the undersides of the leaves are pubescent. The leaves are often prominently toothed. The flowers have yellow rays and are arranged into small heads on branched pyramidal shaped inflorescences, flowering occurs from July to October. It has a rhizomatous growth habit, which can produce large colonies of clones.

== Distribution, habitat and ecology ==
Solidago canadensis is native to northeastern and north-central North America. It is winter hardy in USDA hardiness zones 3–9. It is found in a variety of habitats. It typically is one of the first plants to colonize an area after a disturbance (such as fire) and rarely persists once shrubs and trees become established. It is found in very dry locations (e.g. road sides) and also waterlogged ones (e.g. moist thickets).

Canada goldenrod is visited by a wide variety of insects for its pollen and nectar, including bees, wasps, flies, beetles, butterflies, and moths. It is especially strongly favored as a nectar source by bumblebees and paper wasps, such as Polistes parametricus and P. fuscatus. Aside from wasps, it is also visited frequently by honeybees and some butterflies, such as monarchs.

Solidago canadensis is sometimes browsed by deer and is good to fair as food for domestic livestock such as cattle or horses.

It can be extremely aggressive and tends to form monocultures and near-monocultures in parts of its native range, such as in southwest Ohio clay loam. It not only seeds a great deal, but also spreads rapidly via running rhizomes. Its root system is very tough, and plants that have been pulled out of the ground prior to freezing and left exposed atop soil have survived winter temperatures down to -26 °C (-14 °F).

=== Galls ===
Many wasps form parasitic galls inside the stem of goldenrod. There are stem, flower, and bud galls. This species is host to the following insect induced galls:

- Asteromyia carbonifera (Osten Sacken, 1862)
- Asteromyia tumifica (Beutenmuller, 1907)
- Epiblema scudderiana (Clemens, 1860)
- Eurosta solidaginis (Fitch, 1855)
- Eutreta novaeboracensis (Fitch, 1855)
- Gnorimoschema gallaesolidaginis (Fitch, 1855)
- Lasioptera solidaginis Osten Sacken, 1863
- Rhopalomyia capitata Felt, 1908 (spring and summer generation)
- Rhopalomyia solidaginis (Loew, 1862) (spring, summer and autumn generations)
- Schizomyia racemicola (Osten Sacken, 1862)
- Calycomyza solidaginis Kaltenbach, 1869

=== As an invasive species ===
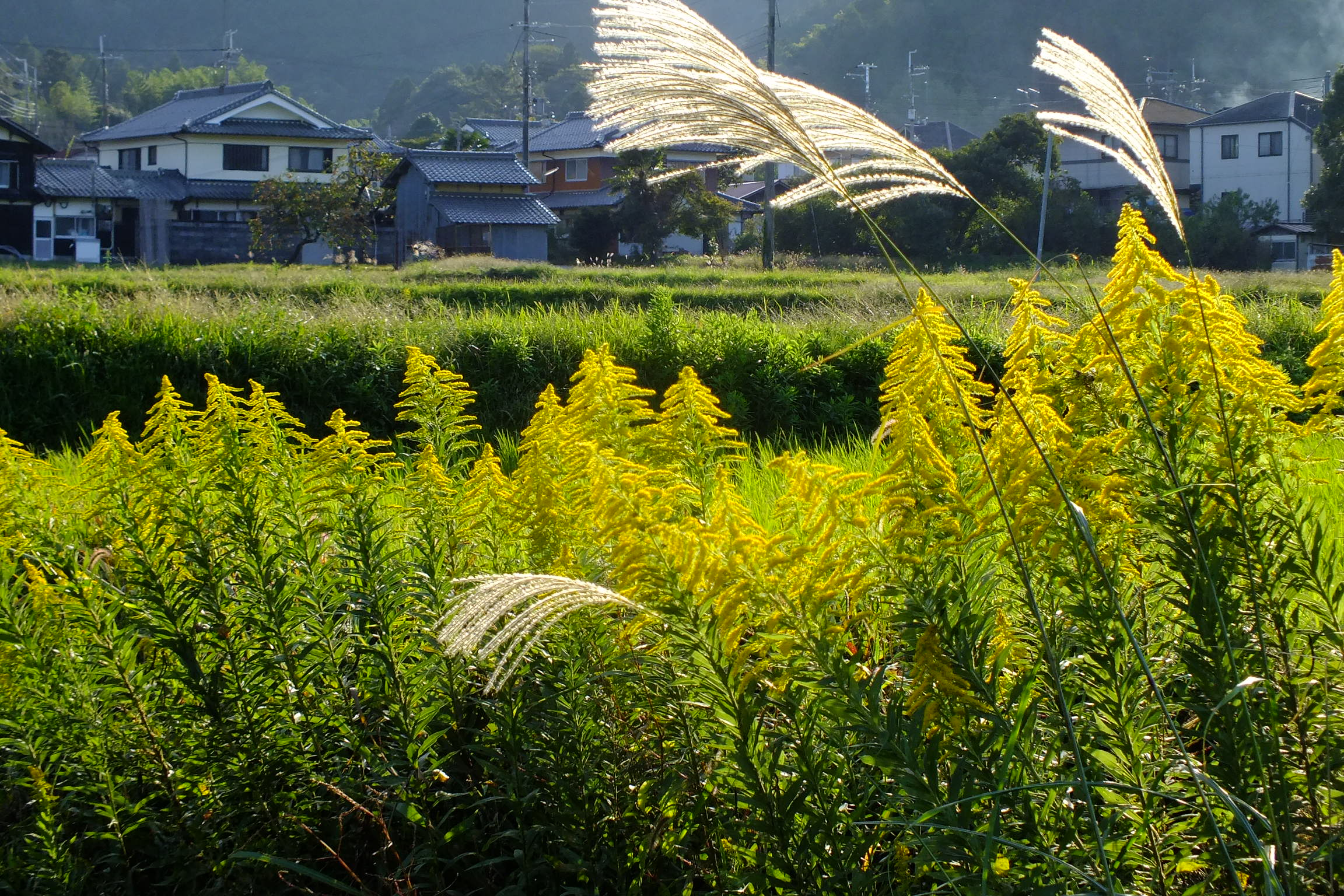
Growing in Japan

It is established as an invasive weed in many parts of Europe, Japan and China.

In eastern and southeastern China, particularly the provinces of Zhejiang, Jiangsu, Jiangxi and Shanghai, its invasion has caused widespread concern. Local news reported that the spread of invasive plants including Canada goldenrod has caused the local extinction of 30 native plants in Shanghai, as of 2004. According to the CCTV program Jiaodian Fangtan, it has reduced orange harvests in Ningbo. It is still spreading across China, and sightings have been reported in as far as Yunnan province. Eradication attempts are still underway as of 2021. Confusion with native Solidago species is a concern.

== Use and importance ==
It is grown as an ornamental plant in flower gardens.

It is sometimes blamed for causing hay fever, which is actually caused by simultaneously blooming ragweed plants.
