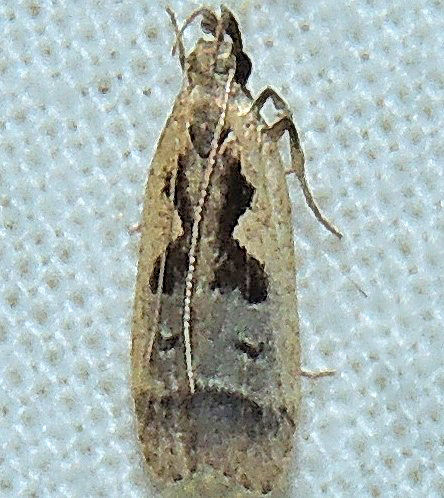

Scientific classification
- Kingdom: Animalia
- Phylum: Arthropoda
- Class: Insecta
- Order: Lepidoptera
- Family: Gelechiidae
- Genus: Dichomeris
- Species: D. bilobella

Binomial name
- Dichomeris bilobella (Zeller, 1873)

Synonyms
- Gelechia (Malacotricha) bilobella Zeller, 1873

= Dichomeris bilobella =

Bilobed dichomeris moth

Species of insect

Dichomeris bilobella, the bilobed dichomeris moth, is a moth in the family Gelechiidae. It was described by Philipp Christoph Zeller in 1873. It is found in North America, where it has been recorded from Nova Scotia, southern Quebec and southern Ontario to Maryland, Minnesota, Missouri and eastern Kansas.

The wingspan is about 15 mm (0.59 in). Adults are on wing from May to August.

The larvae feed on the leaves of Solidago (including Solidago flexicaulis) and Aster species.
