= Dichomeris euprepes =

Scientific classification
- Kingdom: Animalia
- Phylum: Arthropoda
- Clade: Pancrustacea
- Class: Insecta
- Order: Lepidoptera
- Family: Gelechiidae
- Genus: Dichomeris
- Species: D. euprepes

Binomial name
- Dichomeris euprepes Hodges, 1986

Species of moth

Dichomeris euprepes is a moth in the family Gelechiidae. It was described by Ronald W. Hodges in 1986. It is found in North America, where it has been recorded from Kentucky and Florida.

Adults have been recorded on wing in May and October.

The larvae feed on Solidago flexicaulis.
