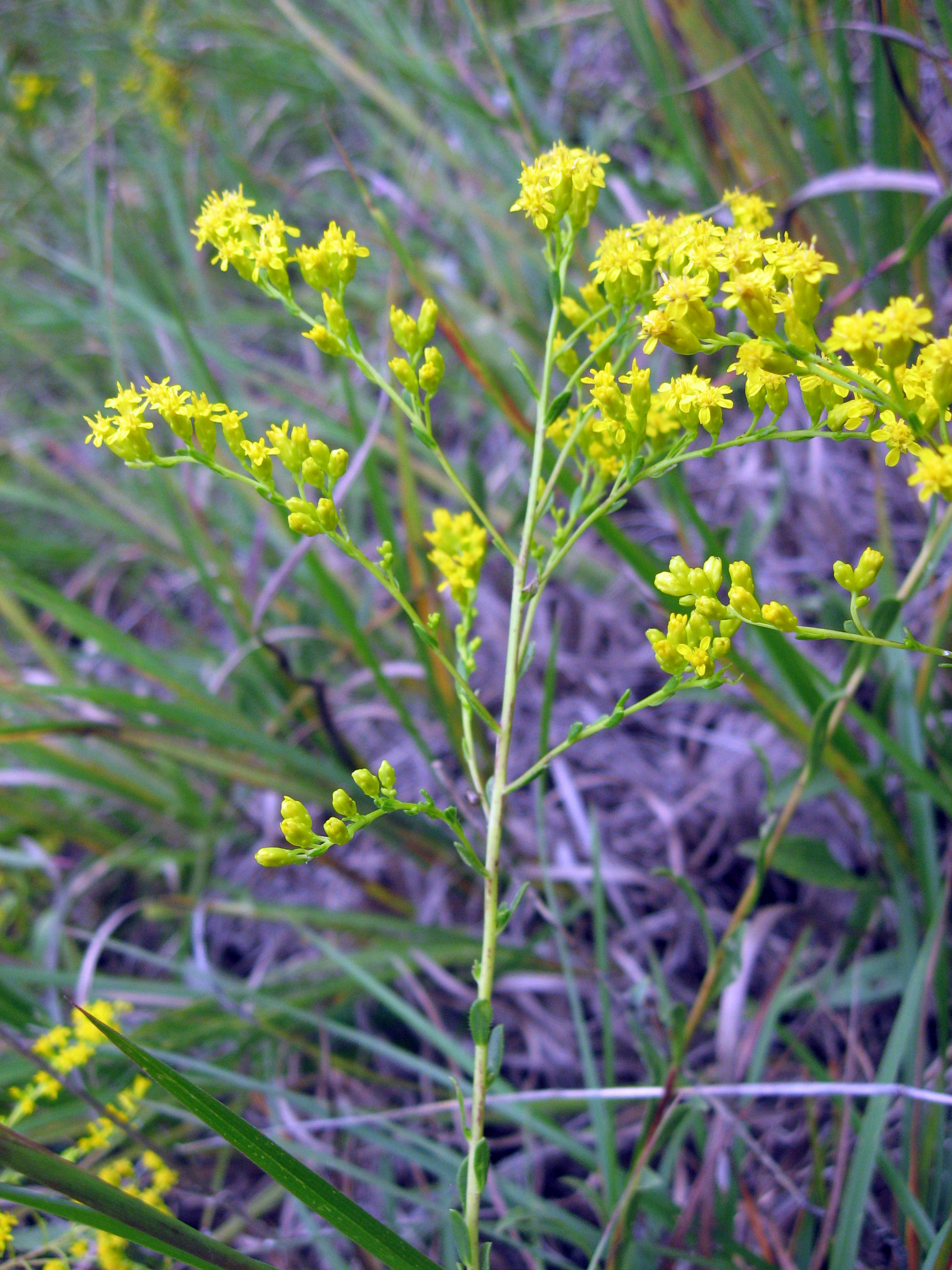

Conservation status
- Vulnerable (NatureServe)

Scientific classification
- Kingdom: Plantae
- Clade: Tracheophytes
- Clade: Angiosperms
- Clade: Eudicots
- Clade: Asterids
- Order: Asterales
- Family: Asteraceae
- Genus: Solidago
- Species: S. gattingeri

Binomial name
- Solidago gattingeri Chapman ex A.Gray

Synonyms
- Aster gattingeri (Chapm. ex A. Gray) Kuntze

= Solidago gattingeri =

Species of flowering plant

Solidago gattingeri, common name Gattinger's goldenrod, is a species of plant that is a goldenrod. It is native only to the Ozark Mountains of Arkansas and Missouri and to the Nashville Basin of Tennessee. Its preferred habitat is cedar glades, cedar barrens, and limestone outcrops. It is adapted to dry habitats.

Solidago gattingeri is a perennial that produces yellow flowers in late summer. One plant can produce as many as 250 small yellow flower heads, some of then in large arrays at the top of the plant, others in smaller clusters on side branches. It is distinguished from the related Solidago juncea by having fewer flowers per head (only 1-5 ray florets and 4-11 disc florets). It is also closely related to Solidago missouriensis but is distinguished by having bract-like upper leaves and shorter rhizomes.
