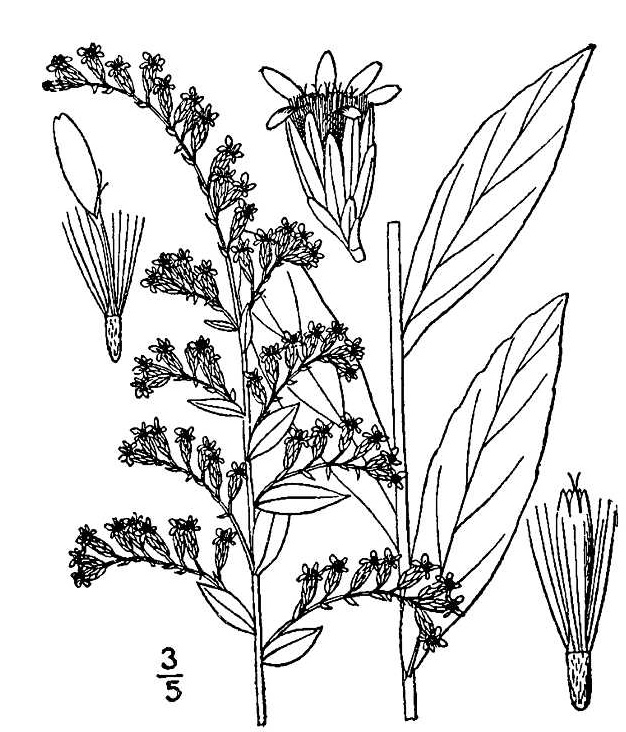
- 1913 illustration

Scientific classification
- Kingdom: Plantae
- Clade: Tracheophytes
- Clade: Angiosperms
- Clade: Eudicots
- Clade: Asterids
- Order: Asterales
- Family: Asteraceae
- Genus: Solidago
- Species: S. latissimifolia

Binomial name
- Solidago latissimifolia Mill. 1768

Synonyms
- Synonymy: Aster latissimifolius (Mill.) Kuntze; Dasiorima elliotii Raf.; Solidago edisoniana Mack.; Solidago elliottii Torr. & A. Gray; Solidago elliptica Elliott; Solidago elliptica Aiton; Solidago mirabilis Small

= Solidago latissimifolia =

Species of flowering plant

Solidago latissimifolia, common name Elliott's goldenrod, is North American species of flowering plants in the family Asteraceae. It is native to the Atlantic Coast of the United States and Canada, from Nova Scotia south to Alabama and Florida.

Solidago latissimifolia is a perennial herb up to 400 cm (13 ft) tall, spreading by means of underground rhizomes. Leaves are elliptical, up to 15 cm (6 in) long. One plant can produce as many as 800 small yellow flower heads, in large branching arrays at the tops of the stems. The species grows in marshes (fresh water or brackish water) and thickets on the coastal plain.

== Conservation status in the United States ==
It is listed as endangered in New York, and as a species of special concern in Rhode Island. It is a special concern and believed extirpated in Connecticut.

== Galls ==
This species is host to the following insect induced gall:

- Asteromyia carbonifera (Osten Sacken, 1862)
- Calycomyza solidaginis Kaltenbach, 1869

external link to gallformers
