= Calycomyza solidaginis =

Scientific classification
- Kingdom: Animalia
- Phylum: Arthropoda
- Class: Insecta
- Order: Diptera
- Family: Agromyzidae
- Subfamily: Phytomyzinae
- Genus: Calycomyza
- Species: C. solidaginis

Binomial name
- Calycomyza solidaginis (Kaltenbach, 1869)

Synonyms
- Agromyza solidaginis Kaltenbach, 1869

Species of fly

Calycomyza solidaginis is a species of fly in the family Agromyzidae.

== Distribution ==
Canada, United States.

== Hosts ==
Solidago altissima, Solidago canadensis, Solidago latissimifolia, Solidago sempervirens, Solidago gigantea, Solidago juncea, Solidago odora, Solidago rugosa, Solidago speciosa, Solidago ulmifolia, Oligoneuron rigidum.
