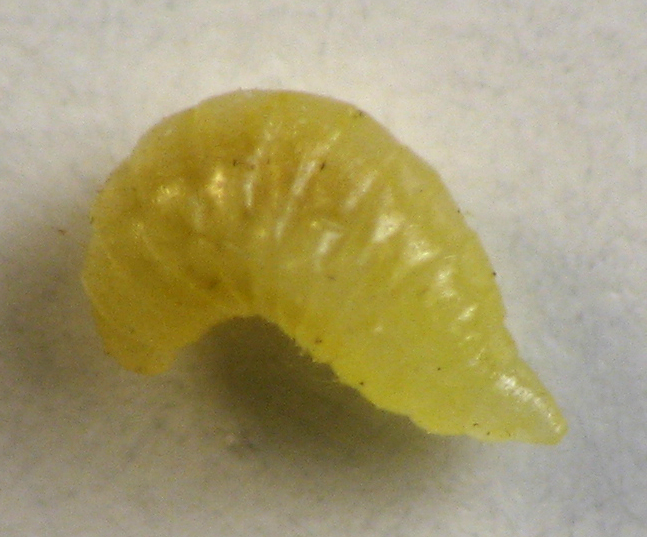
- Asteromyia carbonifera, larva

Scientific classification
- Domain: Eukaryota
- Kingdom: Animalia
- Phylum: Arthropoda
- Class: Insecta
- Order: Diptera
- Family: Cecidomyiidae
- Tribe: Alycaulini
- Genus: Asteromyia; Felt, 1910

= Asteromyia =

Genus of flies

Asteromyia is a genus of gall midges in the family Cecidomyiidae. There are about nine described species in Asteromyia.

== Species ==
These nine species belong to the genus Asteromyia:

- Asteromyia carbonifera (Osten Sacken, 1862)
- Asteromyia chrysothamni Felt, 1918
- Asteromyia clarkei (Felt, 1909)
- Asteromyia euthamiae Gagne, 1968
- Asteromyia gutierreziae Felt, 1916
- Asteromyia laeviana (Felt, 1907)
- Asteromyia modesta (Felt, 1907)
- Asteromyia tumifica (Beutenmuller, 1907)
- Asteromyia urostigmatis (Tavares, 1917)
