= Gnorimoschema gibsoniella =

Scientific classification
- Kingdom: Animalia
- Phylum: Arthropoda
- Clade: Pancrustacea
- Class: Insecta
- Order: Lepidoptera
- Family: Gelechiidae
- Genus: Gnorimoschema
- Species: G. gibsoniella

Binomial name
- Gnorimoschema gibsoniella Busck, 1915

Species of moth

Gnorimoschema gibsoniella is a moth in the family Gelechiidae. It was described by August Busck in 1915. It is found in North America, where it has been recorded from Alberta, Manitoba and Illinois.

The wingspan is about 22 mm. The forewings are bluish white, so strongly suffused with brown and blackish scales, as to make it difficult to determine what the ground colour is. Each white scale has a dark band before the tip and there are three ill-defined brown spots, one on the middle of the cell, one obliquely below on the fold and one at the end of the cell. The basal part and dorsal edge of the wing are least suffused with dark scales. The hindwings are light fuscous.

The larvae feed on Solidago rigida, forming galls just above or close to the ground.
