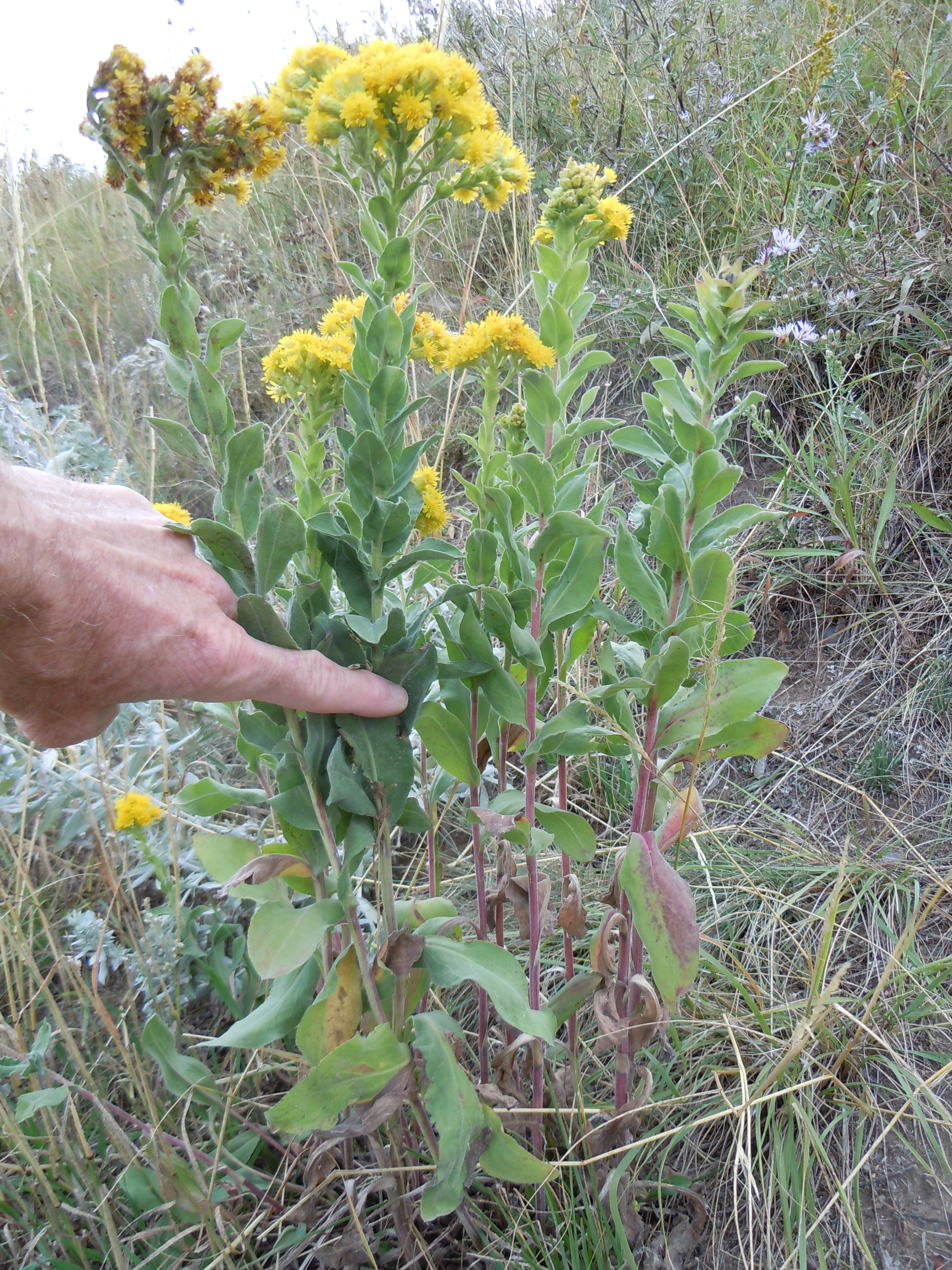
- S. rigida subsp. humilis

Conservation status
- Secure (NatureServe)

Scientific classification
- Kingdom: Plantae
- Clade: Tracheophytes
- Clade: Angiosperms
- Clade: Eudicots
- Clade: Asterids
- Order: Asterales
- Family: Asteraceae
- Genus: Solidago
- Section: S. sect. Ptarmicoidei
- Species: S. rigida

Binomial name
- Solidago rigida L. 1753

Synonyms
- Synonymy: Aster rigidus (L.) Kuntze 1891 not L. 1753; Oligoneuron grandiflorum (Raf.) Small; Oligoneuron rigidum (L.) Small; Solidago grandiflora Raf.; Aster jacksonii Kuntze, syn of subsp. glabrata; Leioligo corymbosa (Elliott) Raf., syn of subsp. glabrata; Oligoneuron corymbosum (Elliott) Small, syn of subsp. glabrata; Oligoneuron jacksonii (Kuntze) Small, syn of subsp. glabrata; Solidago corymbosa Elliott 1823 not Poir. 1817, syn of subsp. glabrata; Solidago jacksonii (Kuntze) Fernald, syn of subsp. glabrata; Oligoneuron bombycinum Lunell, syn of subsp. humilis; Oligoneuron canescens Rydb., syn of subsp. humilis; Solidago bombycina (Lunell) Friesn., syn of subsp. humilis; Solidago bombycinum (Lunell) Friesner, syn of subsp. humilis; Solidago canescens (Rydb.) Friesner, syn of subsp. humilis; Solidago parvirigida Beaudry, syn of subsp. humilis

= Solidago rigida =

Species of flowering plant

Solidago rigida, known by the common names stiff goldenrod and stiff-leaved goldenrod, is a North American plant species in the family Asteraceae. It has a widespread distribution in Canada and the United States, where it is found primarily east of the Rocky Mountains. It is typically found in open, dry areas associated with calcareous or sandy soil. Habitats include prairies, savannas, and glades.

== Description ==
Soliadgo rigida is a tall, leafy perennial. Its leathery leaves are large for a goldenrod, reaching 3–6 cm (1 1/4–2 1/4 in) wide and 8–20 cm (3 1/4–7 3/4 in) long. It produces heads of yellow flowers in the late summer and fall. Its fruit is a wind-dispersed achene.

== Galls ==
This species is host to the following insect induced galls:

- Asphondylia s-rigida-bud-rosette-gall
- Asteromyia carbonifera (Osten Sacken, 1862)
- Gnorimoschema gibsoniella Busck, 1915
- Calycomyza solidaginis Kaltenbach, 1869

external link to gallformers

== Subspecies ==
Subspecies

- Solidago rigida subsp. glabrata (E.L.Braun) S.B.Heard & Semple – southeastern + south-central U.S.
- Solidago rigida subsp. humilis (Porter) S.B.Heard & Semple – central + western Canada, central + western United States as far west as the Rocky Mountains
- Solidago rigida subsp. rigida – Ontario, central + eastern U.S.
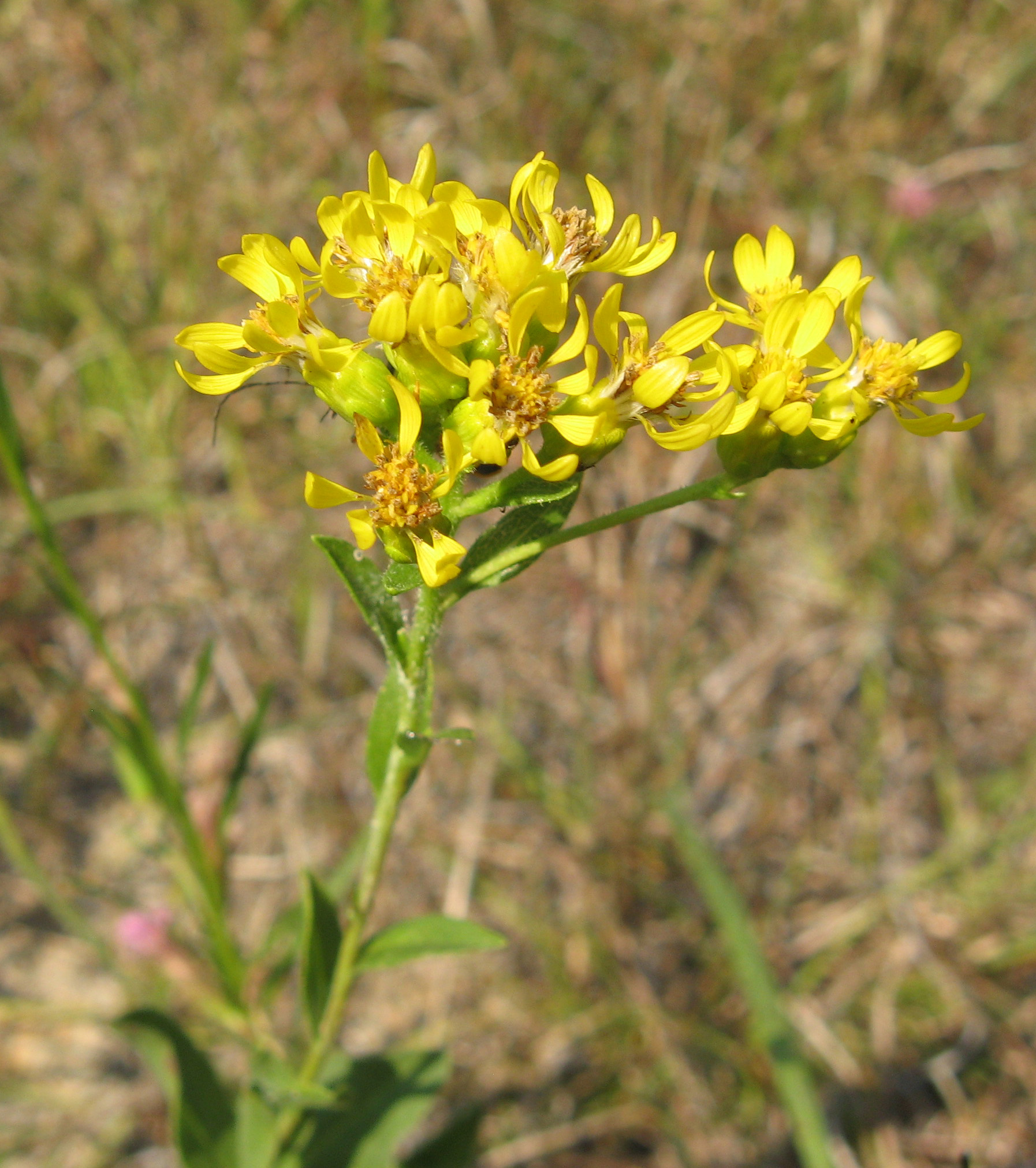
Subspecies glabrata has hairless outer phyllaries, and a less pubescent stem and leaves

== Conservation ==
This species is considered by NatureServe to be globally "secure" (G5), which is the lowest level of conservation concern assigned. However, it is known to be rare on the local level, due to its declining grassland habitat. It is listed as endangered in Connecticut, New Jersey and Pennsylvania. It is listed as endangered and extirpated in Maryland, as threatened in New York, and as historical in Rhode Island.

== Native American ethnobotany ==
The Ojibwe use a decoction of root as an enema, and take an infusion of the root to treat "stoppage of urine". The Meskwaki make the flowers into a lotion and use them on bee stings and for swollen faces.
