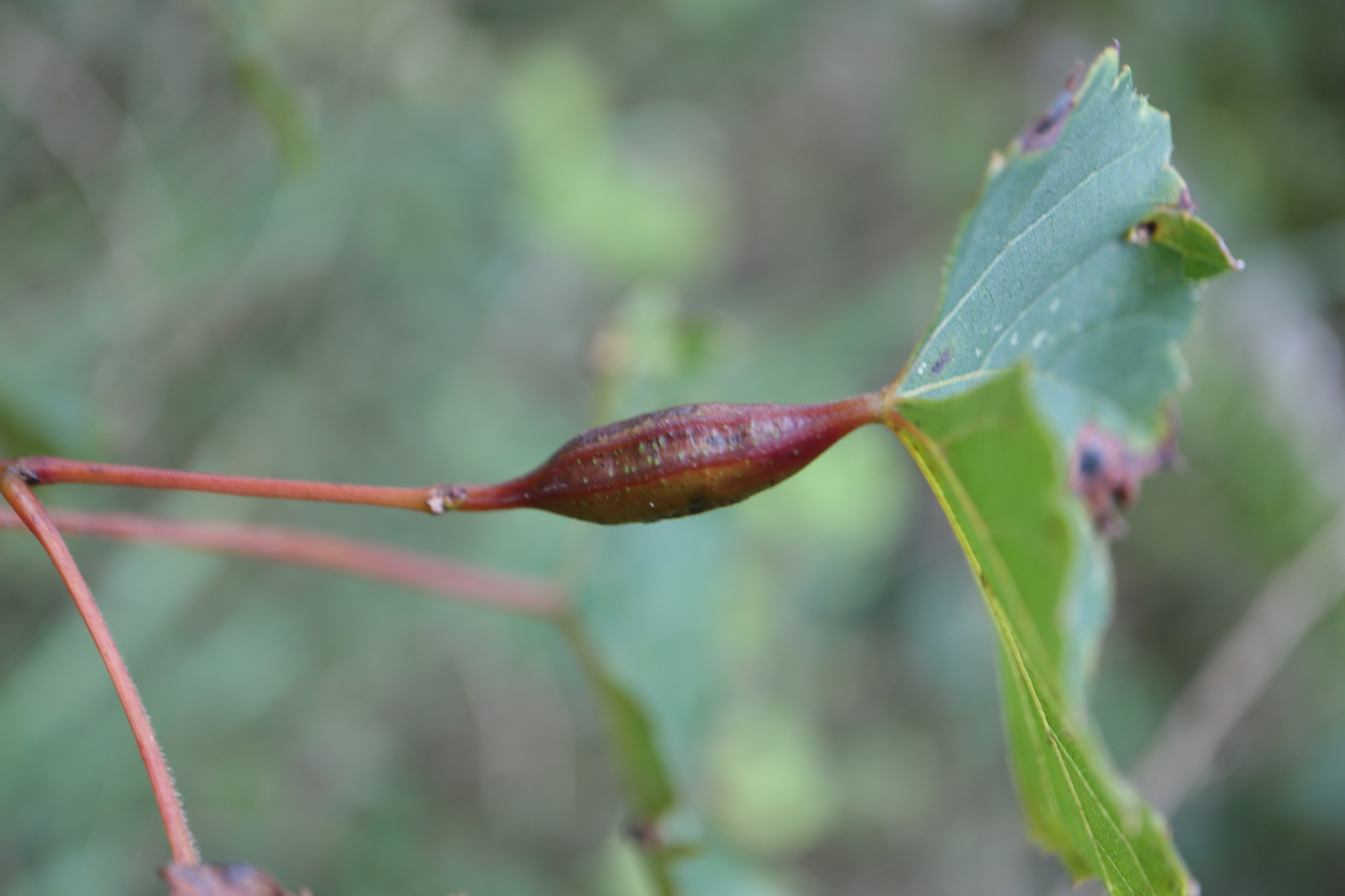
- Stem gall on Vitis sp. caused by Neolasioptera vitinea

Scientific classification
- Kingdom: Animalia
- Phylum: Arthropoda
- Class: Insecta
- Order: Diptera
- Family: Cecidomyiidae
- Subfamily: Cecidomyiinae
- Tribe: Alycaulini
- Genus: Neolasioptera
- Species: N. vitinea

Binomial name
- Neolasioptera vitinea (Felt, 1907)

Synonyms
- Baldratia petiolicola Felt, 1908; Lasioptera riparia Felt, 1909; Lasioptera vitinea Felt, 1907

= Neolasioptera vitinea =

Species of fly

Neolasioptera vitinea is a species of gall midge in the family Cecidomyiidae.
