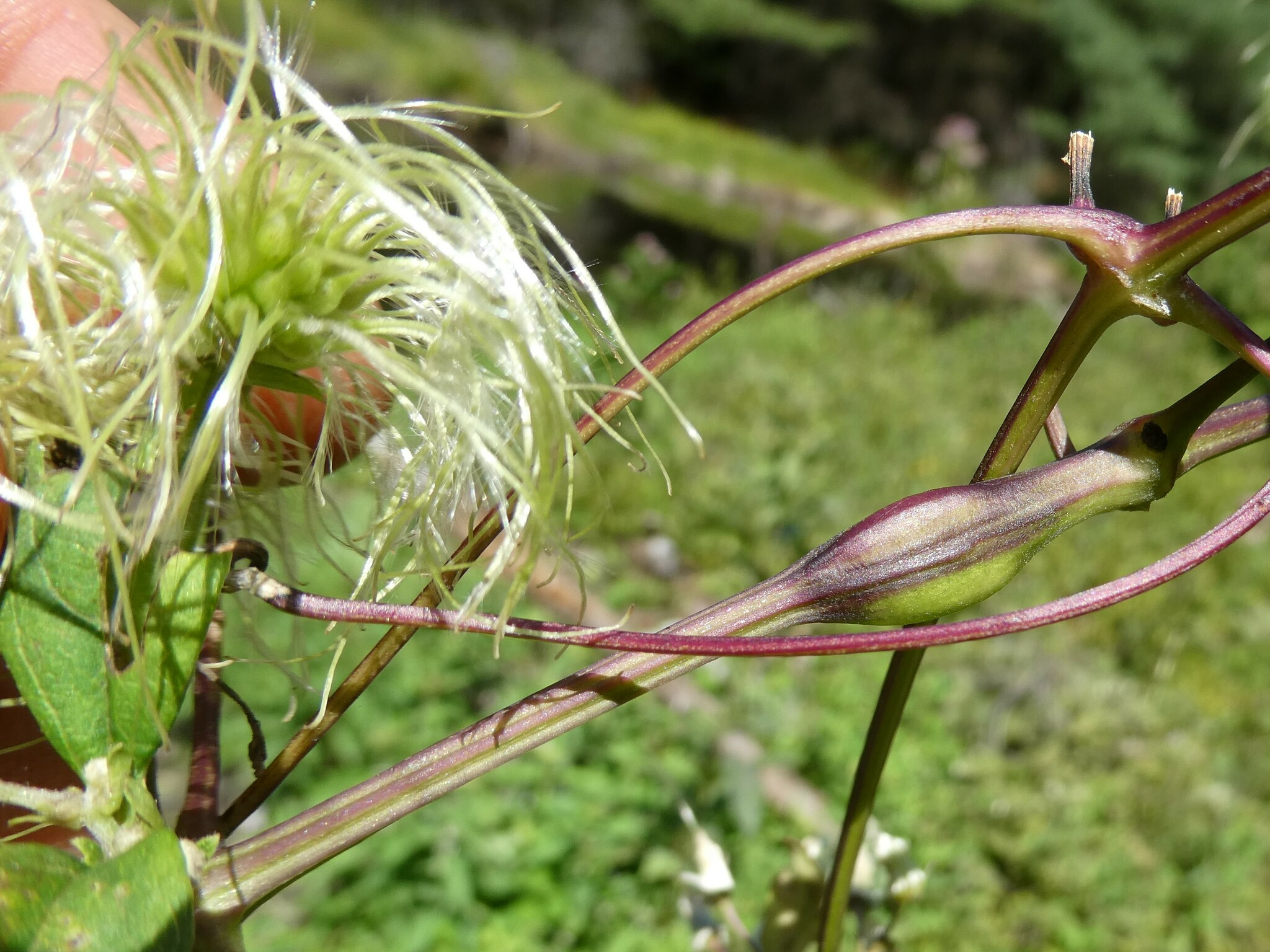
- Clematis stem gall caused by Neolasioptera clematidis

Scientific classification
- Domain: Eukaryota
- Kingdom: Animalia
- Phylum: Arthropoda
- Class: Insecta
- Order: Diptera
- Family: Cecidomyiidae
- Subfamily: Cecidomyiinae
- Tribe: Alycaulini
- Genus: Neolasioptera
- Species: N. clematidis

Binomial name
- Neolasioptera clematidis (Felt, 1907)

Synonyms
- Choristoneura clematidis Felt, 1907

= Neolasioptera clematidis =

Species of fly

Neolasioptera clematidis is a species of gall midges, insects in the family Cecidomyiidae.
