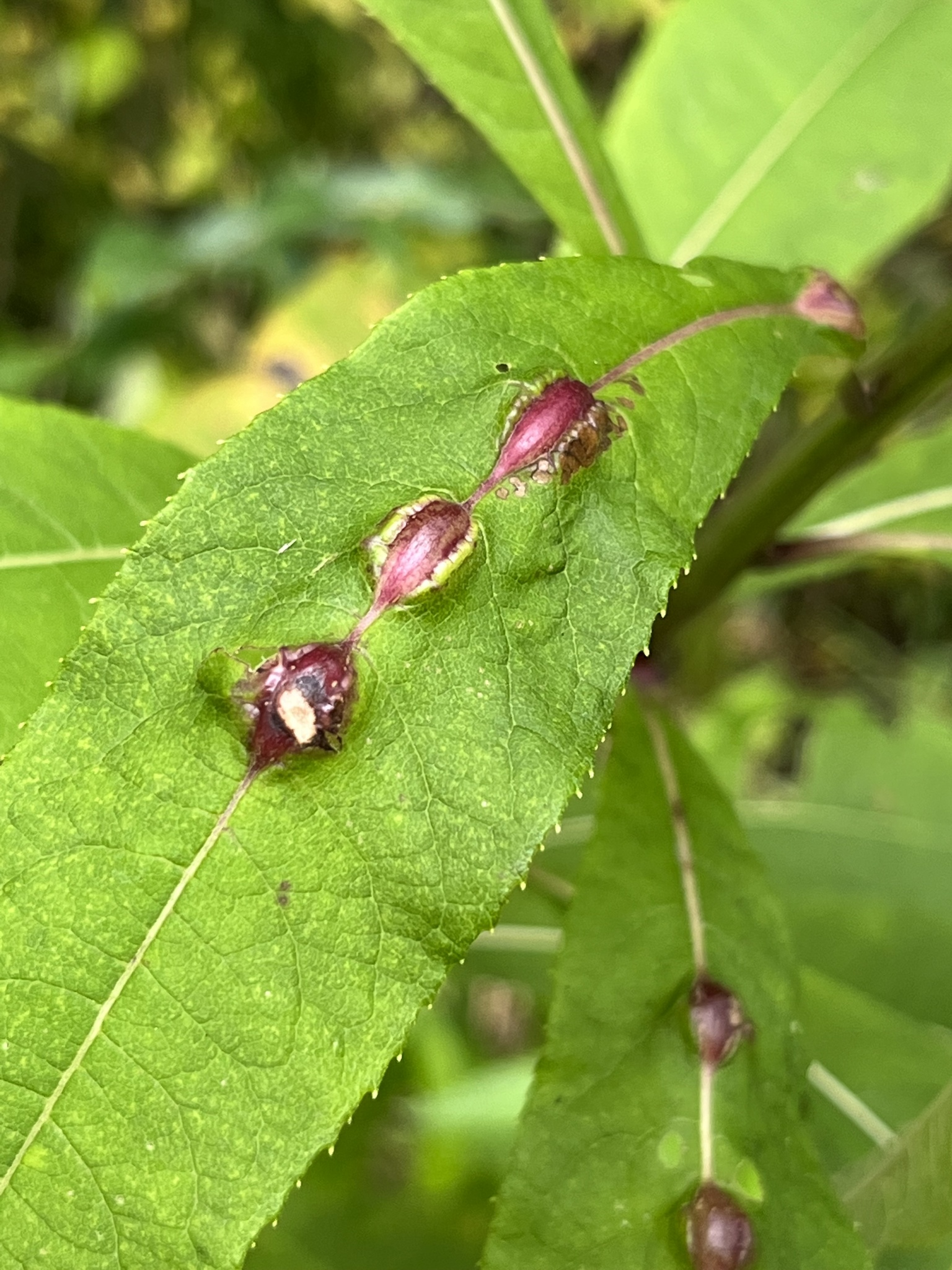
- Leaf galls caused by Neolasioptera vernoniae

Scientific classification
- Domain: Eukaryota
- Kingdom: Animalia
- Phylum: Arthropoda
- Class: Insecta
- Order: Diptera
- Family: Cecidomyiidae
- Subfamily: Cecidomyiinae
- Tribe: Alycaulini
- Genus: Neolasioptera
- Species: N. vernoniae

Binomial name
- Neolasioptera vernoniae (Beutenmuller, 1907)

Synonyms
- Cecidomyia vernoniae Beutenmuller, 1907; Lasioptera vernoniflorae Felt, 1908

= Neolasioptera vernoniae =

Species of fly

Neolasioptera vernoniae is a species of gall midges, insects in the family Cecidomyiidae.
