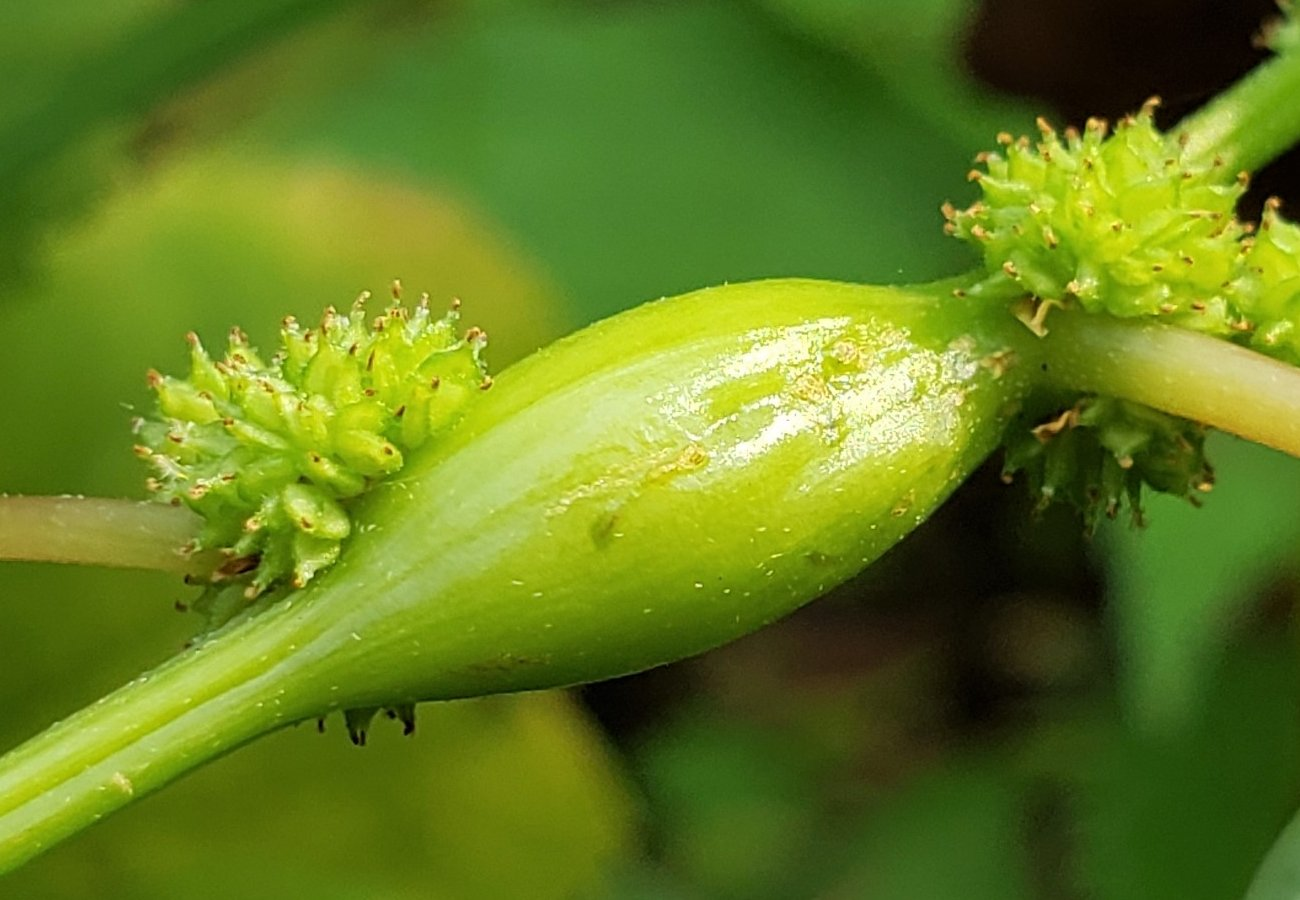

Scientific classification
- Domain: Eukaryota
- Kingdom: Animalia
- Phylum: Arthropoda
- Class: Insecta
- Order: Diptera
- Family: Cecidomyiidae
- Subfamily: Cecidomyiinae
- Tribe: Alycaulini
- Genus: Neolasioptera
- Species: N. boehmeriae

Binomial name
- Neolasioptera boehmeriae (Beutenmuller, 1908)

Synonyms
- Cecidomyia boehmeriae Beutenmuller, 1908

= Neolasioptera boehmeriae =

Species of fly

Neolasioptera boehmeriae is a species of gall midges, insects in the family Cecidomyiidae. It is found in the northeastern United States and Southern Canada. False nettles (genus Boehmeria) are host plants of Neolasioptera boehmeriae.
