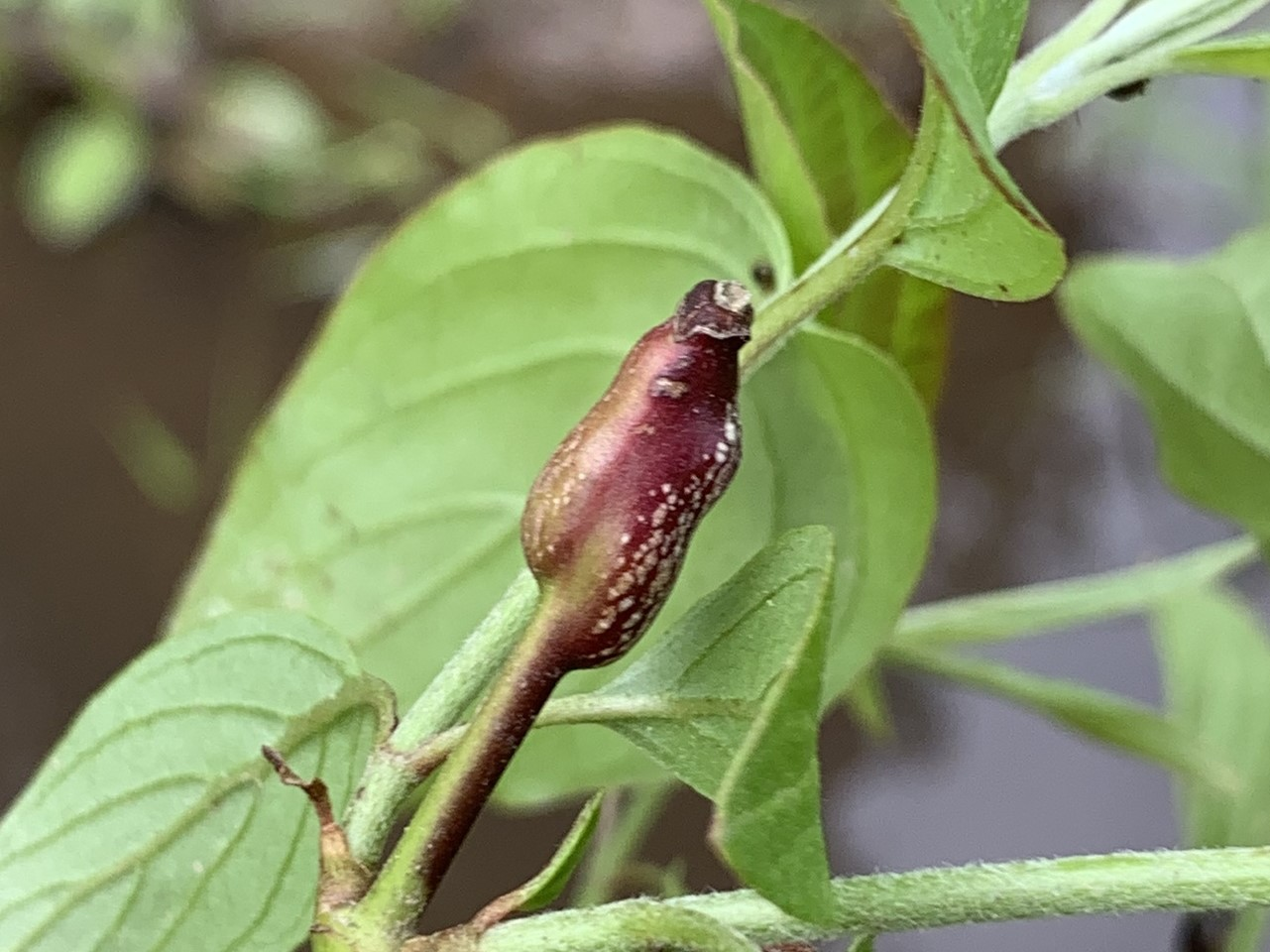
- Stem gall on gray dogwood caused by Neolasioptera cornicola

Scientific classification
- Domain: Eukaryota
- Kingdom: Animalia
- Phylum: Arthropoda
- Class: Insecta
- Order: Diptera
- Family: Cecidomyiidae
- Subfamily: Cecidomyiinae
- Tribe: Alycaulini
- Genus: Neolasioptera
- Species: N. cornicola

Binomial name
- Neolasioptera cornicola (Beutenmuller, 1907)

Synonyms
- Lasioptera cornicola Beutenmuller, 1907

= Neolasioptera cornicola =

Species of fly

Neolasioptera cornicola is a species of gall midges, insects in the family Cecidomyiidae.
