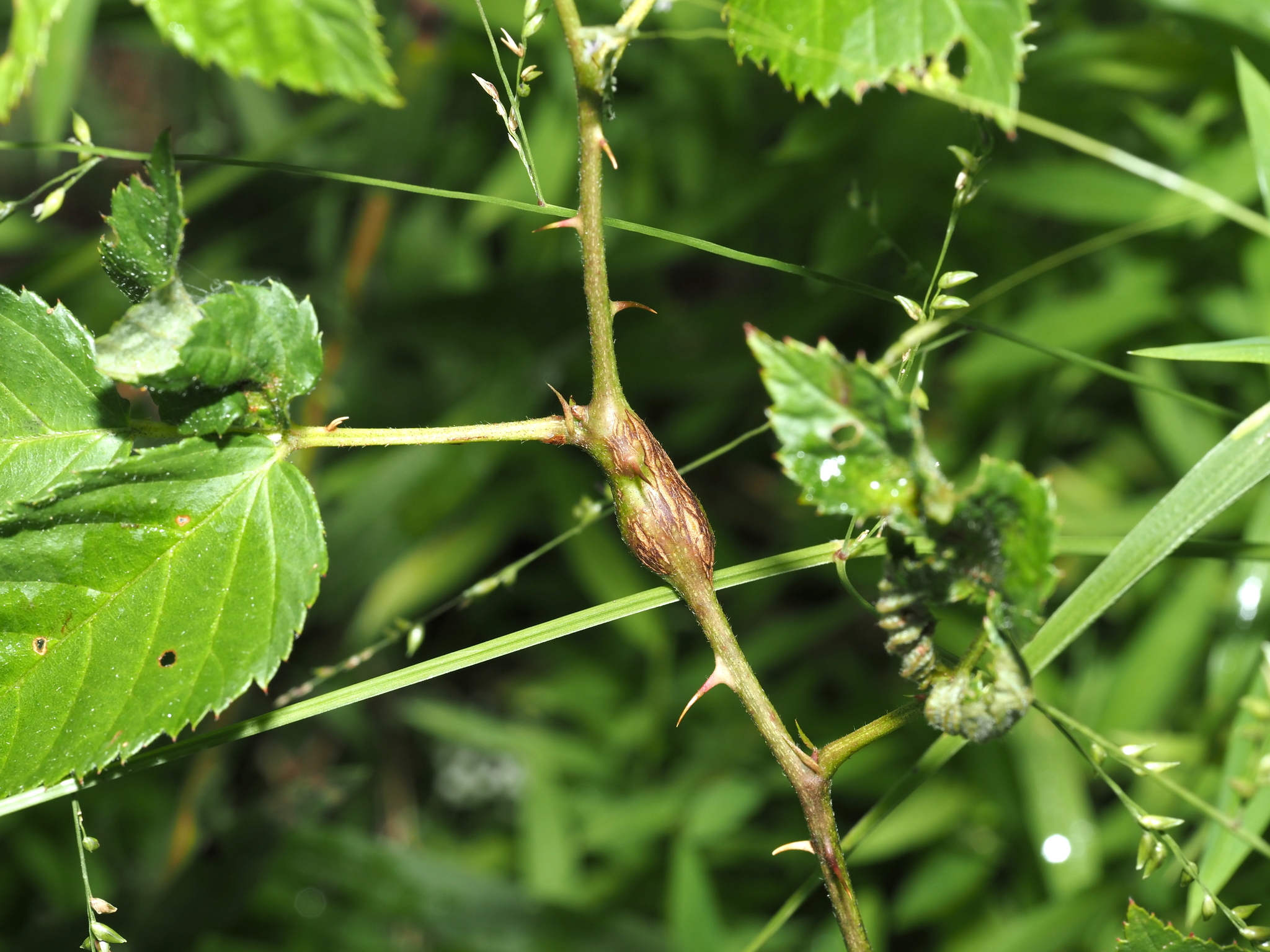
- Stem gall caused by Neolasioptera nodulosa

Scientific classification
- Domain: Eukaryota
- Kingdom: Animalia
- Phylum: Arthropoda
- Class: Insecta
- Order: Diptera
- Family: Cecidomyiidae
- Subfamily: Cecidomyiinae
- Tribe: Alycaulini
- Genus: Neolasioptera
- Species: N. nodulosa

Binomial name
- Neolasioptera nodulosa (Beutenmuller, 1907)

Synonyms
- Lasioptera nodulosa Beutenmuller, 1907

= Neolasioptera nodulosa =

Species of fly

Neolasioptera nodulosa, the nodular stem gall midge, is a species of gall midges, insects in the family Cecidomyiidae.
