= Asteromyia gutierreziae =

Scientific classification
- Domain: Eukaryota
- Kingdom: Animalia
- Phylum: Arthropoda
- Class: Insecta
- Order: Diptera
- Family: Cecidomyiidae
- Genus: Asteromyia
- Species: A. gutierreziae

Binomial name
- Asteromyia gutierreziae Felt, 1916

Species of fly

Asteromyia gutierreziae is a species of gall midges in the family Cecidomyiidae.

They are black, about 3-5mm long and found on upper leaves, lower leaves and the stem.

They can cause galls, on such plants as Medranoa palmeri (Texas Desert Goldenrod), Baccharis angustifolia, Baccharis sarothroides, Gutierrezia californica, Gutierrezia microcephala, Gutierrezia sarothrae and Gymnosperma glutinosum.
