= Neolasioptera monardi =

Scientific classification
- Domain: Eukaryota
- Kingdom: Animalia
- Phylum: Arthropoda
- Class: Insecta
- Order: Diptera
- Family: Cecidomyiidae
- Subfamily: Cecidomyiinae
- Tribe: Alycaulini
- Genus: Neolasioptera
- Species: N. monardi

Binomial name
- Neolasioptera monardi (Brodie, 1894)

Synonyms
- Diplosis monardi Brodie, 1894

Species of fly

Neolasioptera monardi is a species of gall midges, insects in the family Cecidomyiidae.
