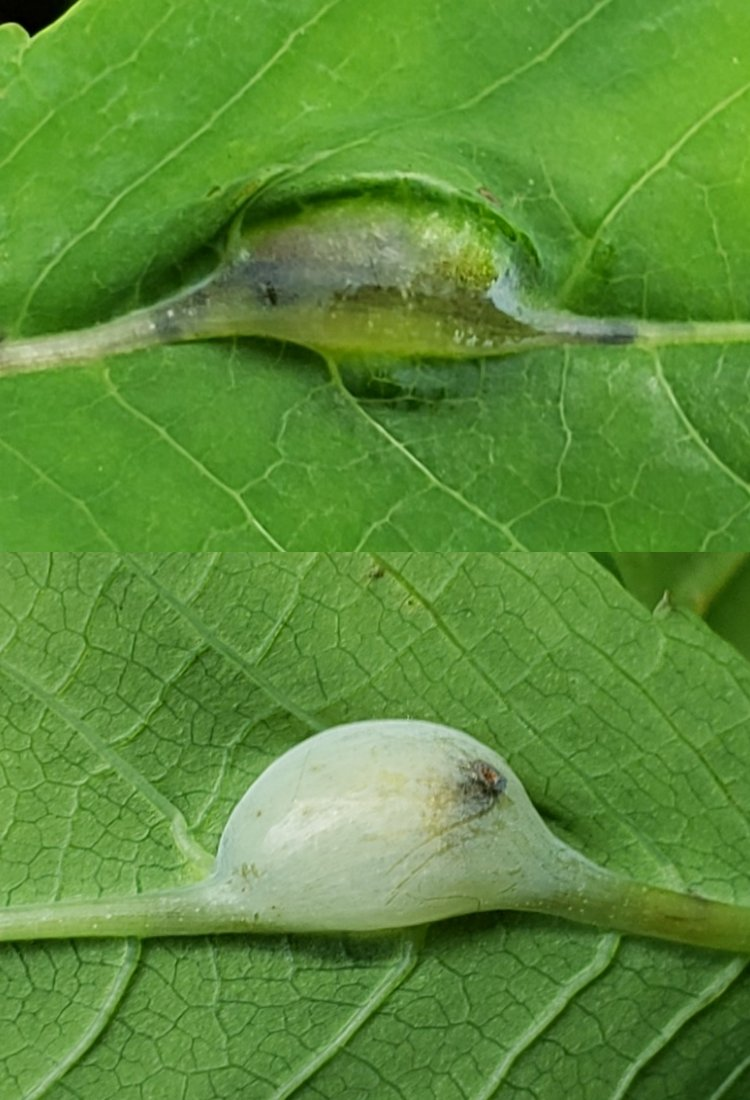

Scientific classification
- Domain: Eukaryota
- Kingdom: Animalia
- Phylum: Arthropoda
- Class: Insecta
- Order: Diptera
- Family: Cecidomyiidae
- Subfamily: Cecidomyiinae
- Tribe: Alycaulini
- Genus: Neolasioptera
- Species: N. impatientifolia

Binomial name
- Neolasioptera impatientifolia (Felt, 1907)

Synonyms
- Cecidomyia fulva Beutenmuller, 1908; Lasioptera impatientifolia Felt, 1907

= Neolasioptera impatientifolia =

Species of fly

Neolasioptera impatientifolia is a species of gall midges, insects in the family Cecidomyiidae.
