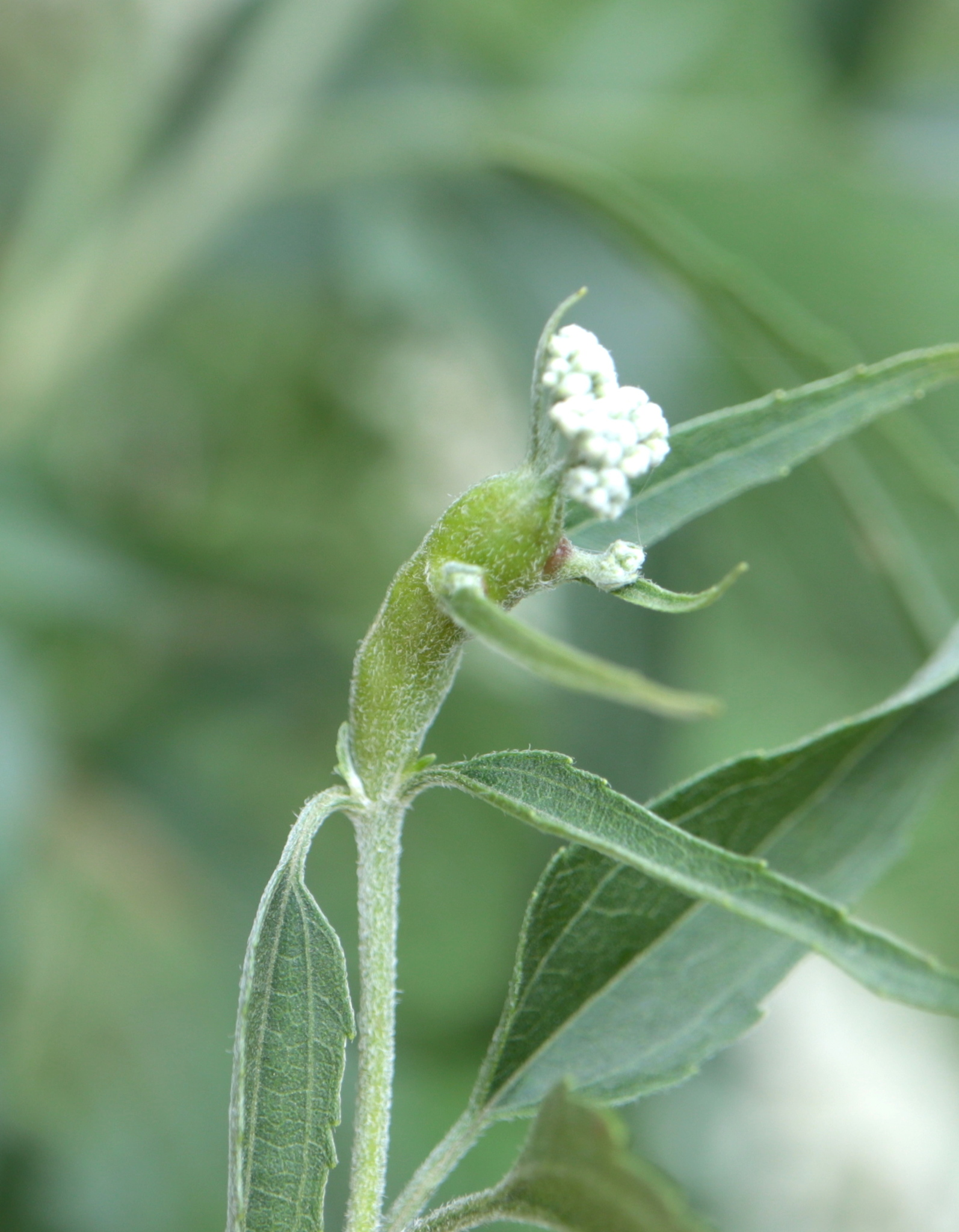
- Stem gall on late boneset caused by Neolasioptera perfoliata

Scientific classification
- Domain: Eukaryota
- Kingdom: Animalia
- Phylum: Arthropoda
- Class: Insecta
- Order: Diptera
- Family: Cecidomyiidae
- Subfamily: Cecidomyiinae
- Tribe: Alycaulini
- Genus: Neolasioptera
- Species: N. perfoliata

Binomial name
- Neolasioptera perfoliata (Felt, 1907)

Synonyms
- Choristoneura perfoliata Felt, 1907

= Neolasioptera perfoliata =

Species of fly

Neolasioptera perfoliata is a species of gall midge in the family Cecidomyiidae.
