= Asteromyia modesta =

Scientific classification
- Domain: Eukaryota
- Kingdom: Animalia
- Phylum: Arthropoda
- Class: Insecta
- Order: Diptera
- Family: Cecidomyiidae
- Genus: Asteromyia
- Species: A. modesta

Binomial name
- Asteromyia modesta (Felt, 1907)

Synonyms
- Asteromyia grindeliae Felt, 1912; Choristoneura modesta Felt, 1907

Species of fly

Asteromyia modesta is a species of gall midges in the family Cecidomyiidae.
