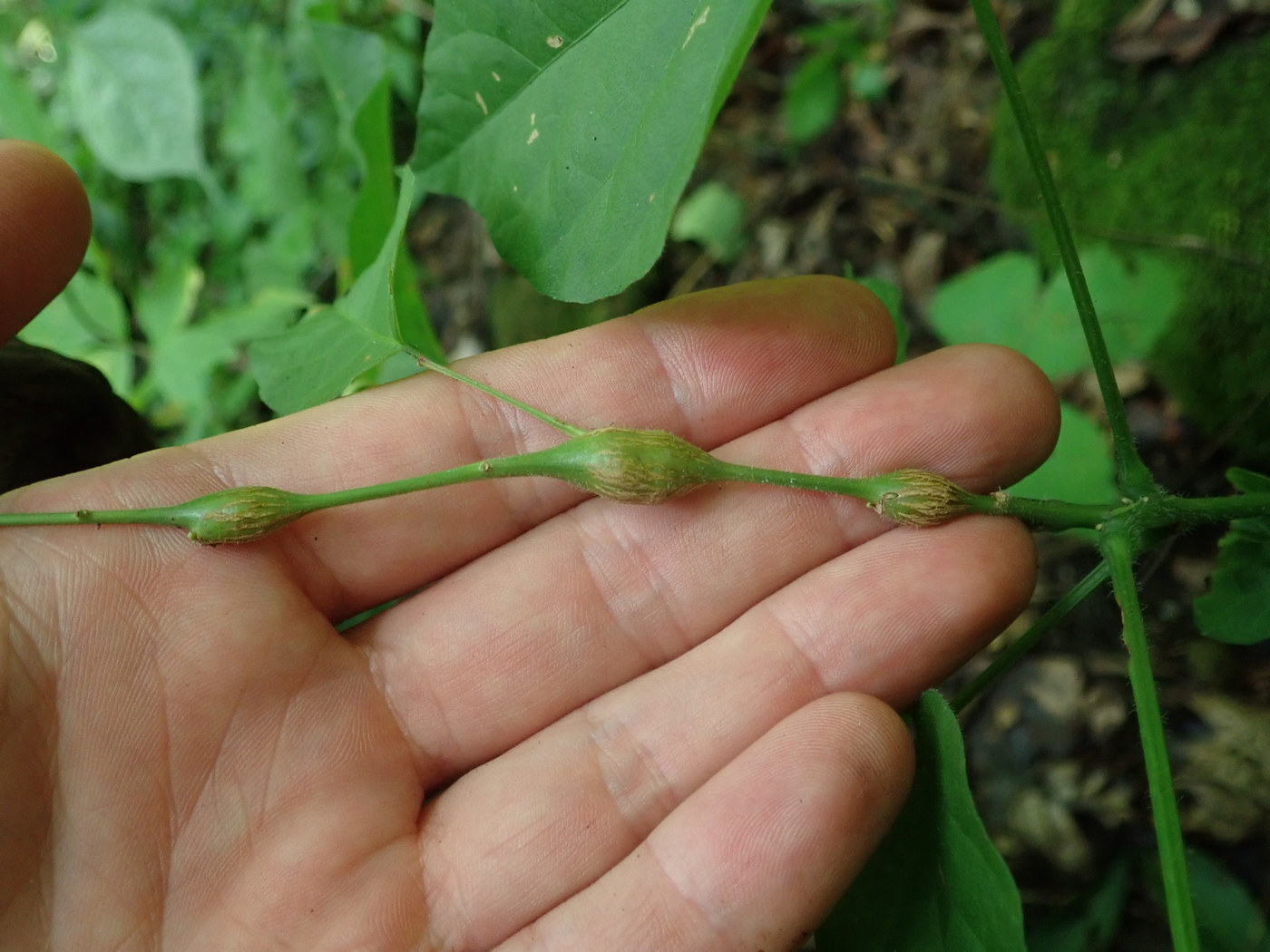
- Stem galls on pointed-leaved tick-trefoil, caused by Neolasioptera desmodii

Scientific classification
- Domain: Eukaryota
- Kingdom: Animalia
- Phylum: Arthropoda
- Class: Insecta
- Order: Diptera
- Family: Cecidomyiidae
- Genus: Neolasioptera
- Species: N. desmodii

Binomial name
- Neolasioptera desmodii (Felt, 1907)

Synonyms
- Lasioptera desmodii Felt, 1907

= Neolasioptera desmodii =

Species of fly

Neolasioptera desmodii is a species of gall midges, insects in the family Cecidomyiidae.
