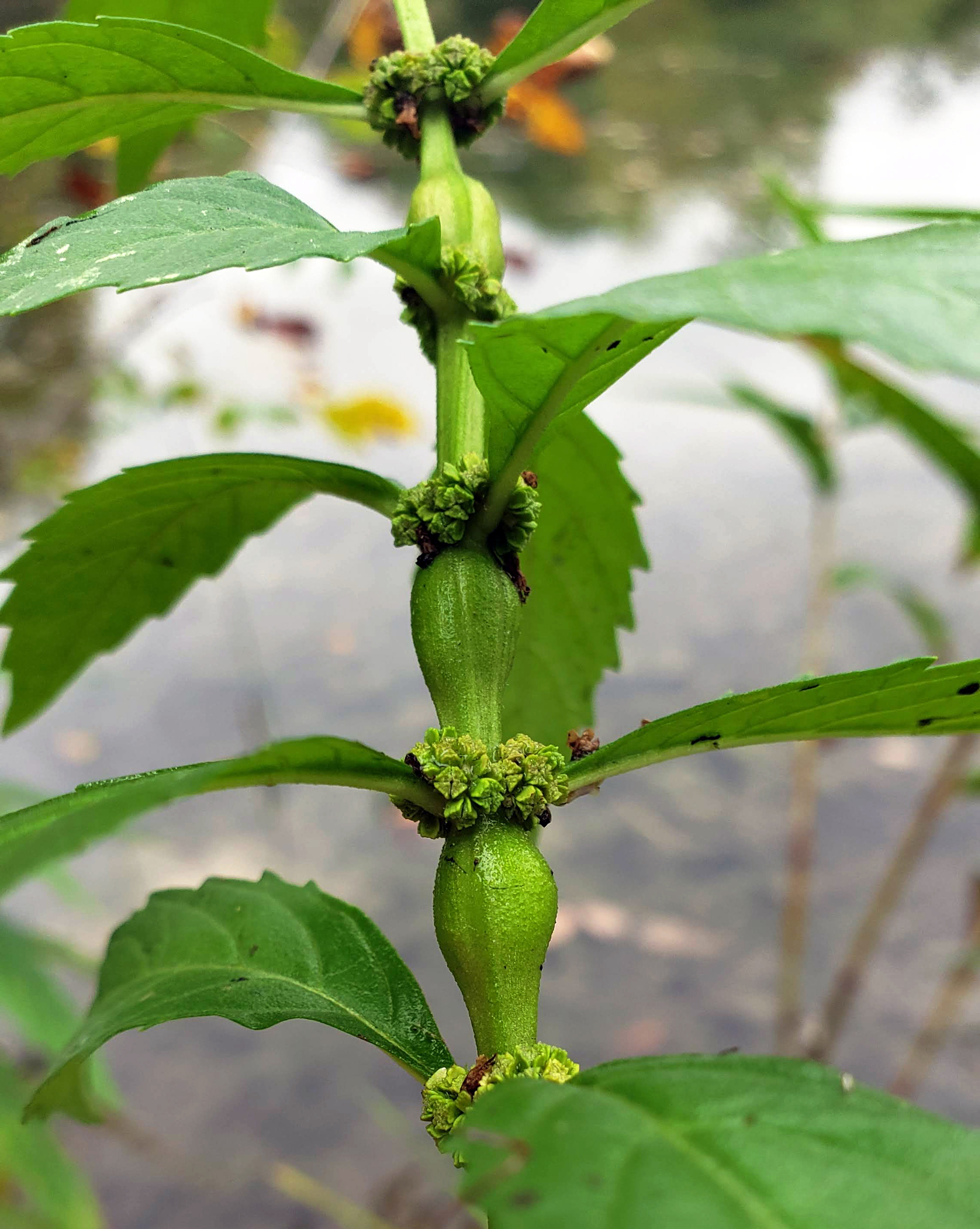
- Stem galls caused by Neolasioptera lycopi

Scientific classification
- Domain: Eukaryota
- Kingdom: Animalia
- Phylum: Arthropoda
- Class: Insecta
- Order: Diptera
- Family: Cecidomyiidae
- Genus: Neolasioptera
- Species: N. lycopi

Binomial name
- Neolasioptera lycopi (Felt, 1907)

Synonyms
- Lasioptera lycopi Felt, 1907

= Neolasioptera lycopi =

Species of fly

Neolasioptera lycopi is a species of gall midges, insects in the family Cecidomyiidae.
