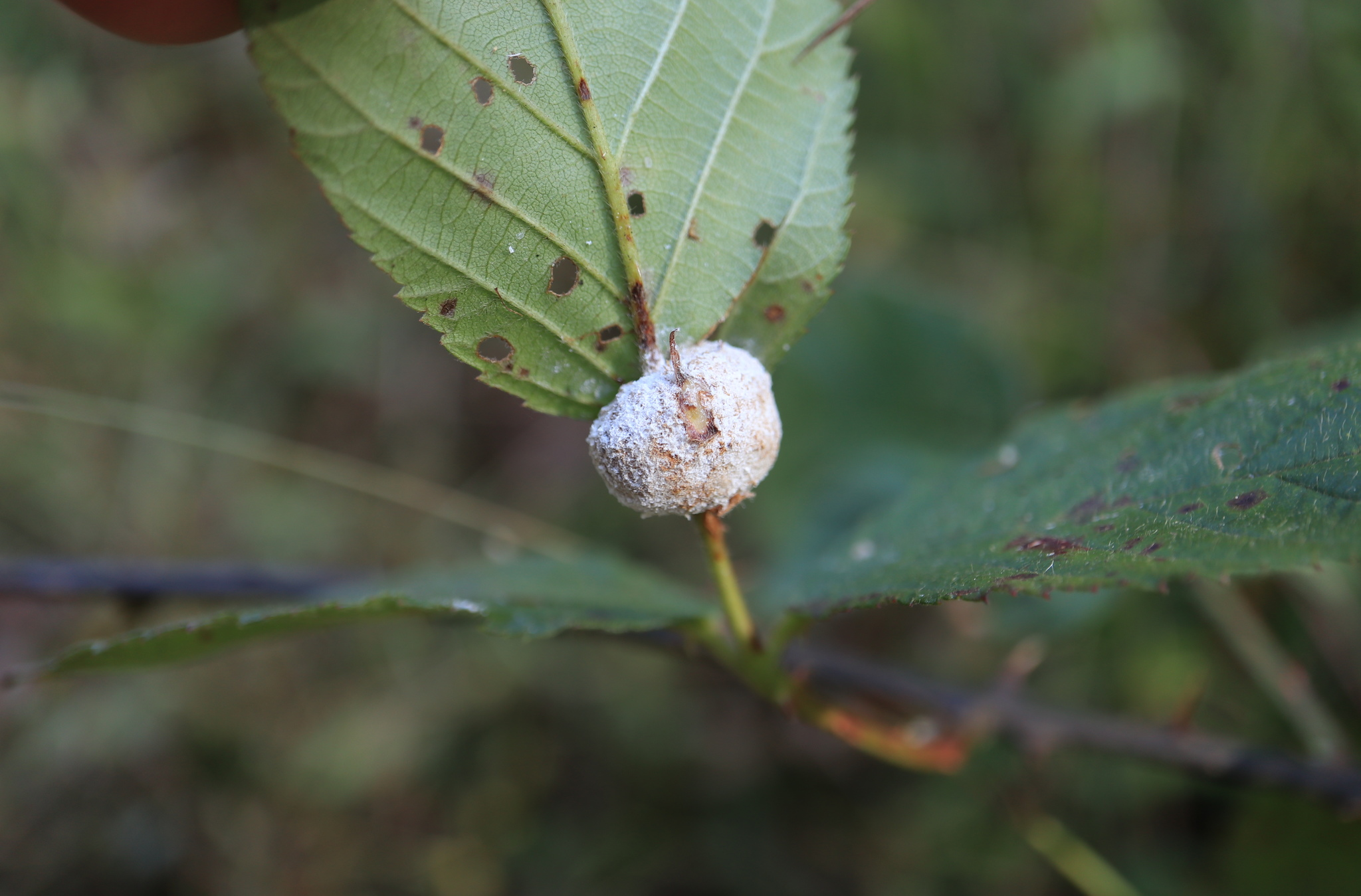
- Stem gall on Rubus sp. caused by Neolasioptera farinosa

Scientific classification
- Domain: Eukaryota
- Kingdom: Animalia
- Phylum: Arthropoda
- Class: Insecta
- Order: Diptera
- Family: Cecidomyiidae
- Genus: Neolasioptera
- Species: N. farinosa

Binomial name
- Neolasioptera farinosa (Osten Sacken, 1862)

Synonyms
- Cecidomyia farinosa Osten Sacken, 1862

= Neolasioptera farinosa =

Species of fly

Neolasioptera farinosa is a species of gall midges, insects in the family Cecidomyiidae.
