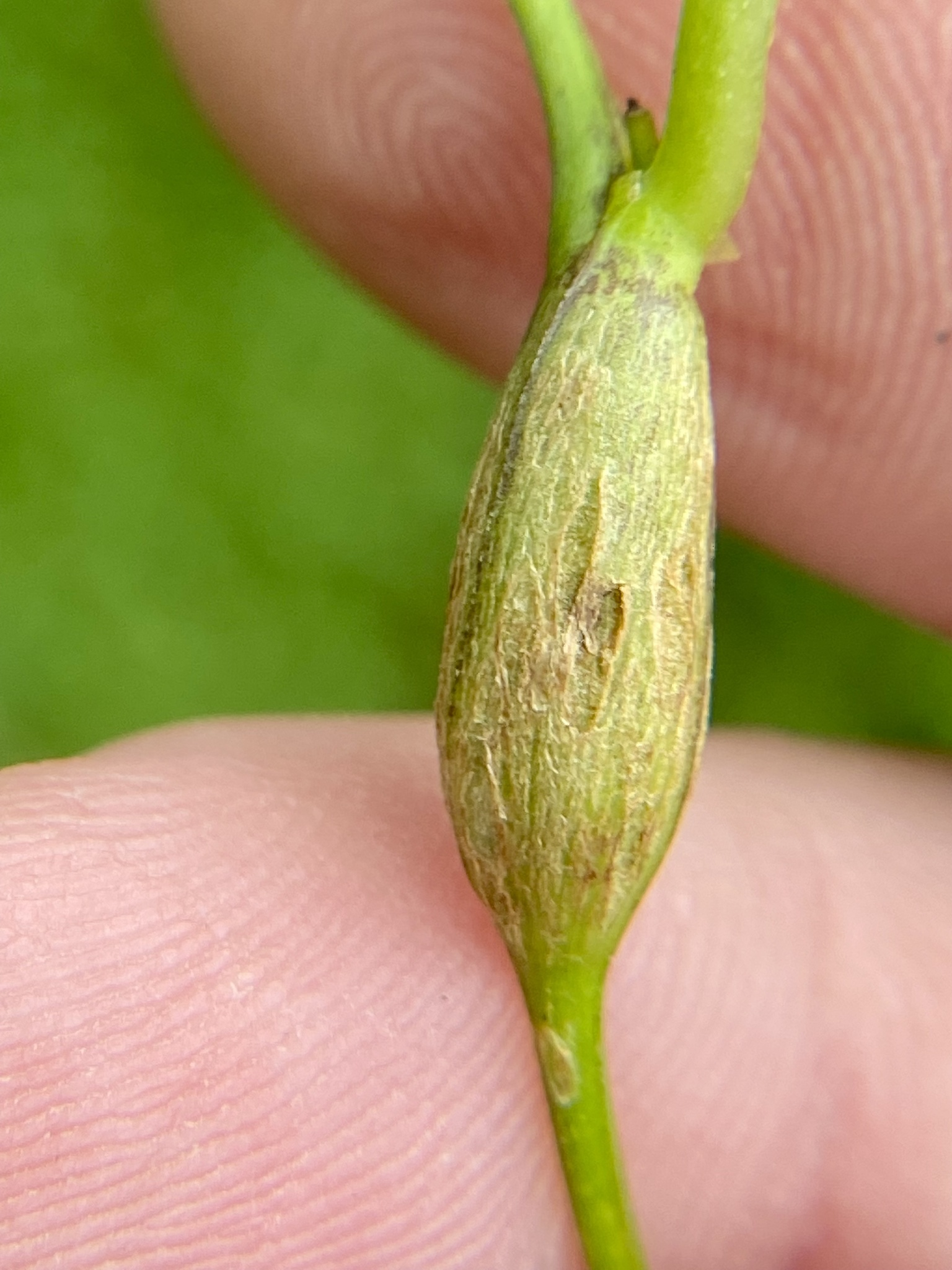
- Stem gall on short-stalked false bindweed caused by Neolasioptera convolvuli

Scientific classification
- Domain: Eukaryota
- Kingdom: Animalia
- Phylum: Arthropoda
- Class: Insecta
- Order: Diptera
- Family: Cecidomyiidae
- Genus: Neolasioptera
- Species: N. convolvuli

Binomial name
- Neolasioptera convolvuli (Felt, 1907)

Synonyms
- Lasioptera convolvuli Felt, 1907

= Neolasioptera convolvuli =

Species of fly

Neolasioptera convolvuli is a species of gall midges, insects in the family Cecidomyiidae.
