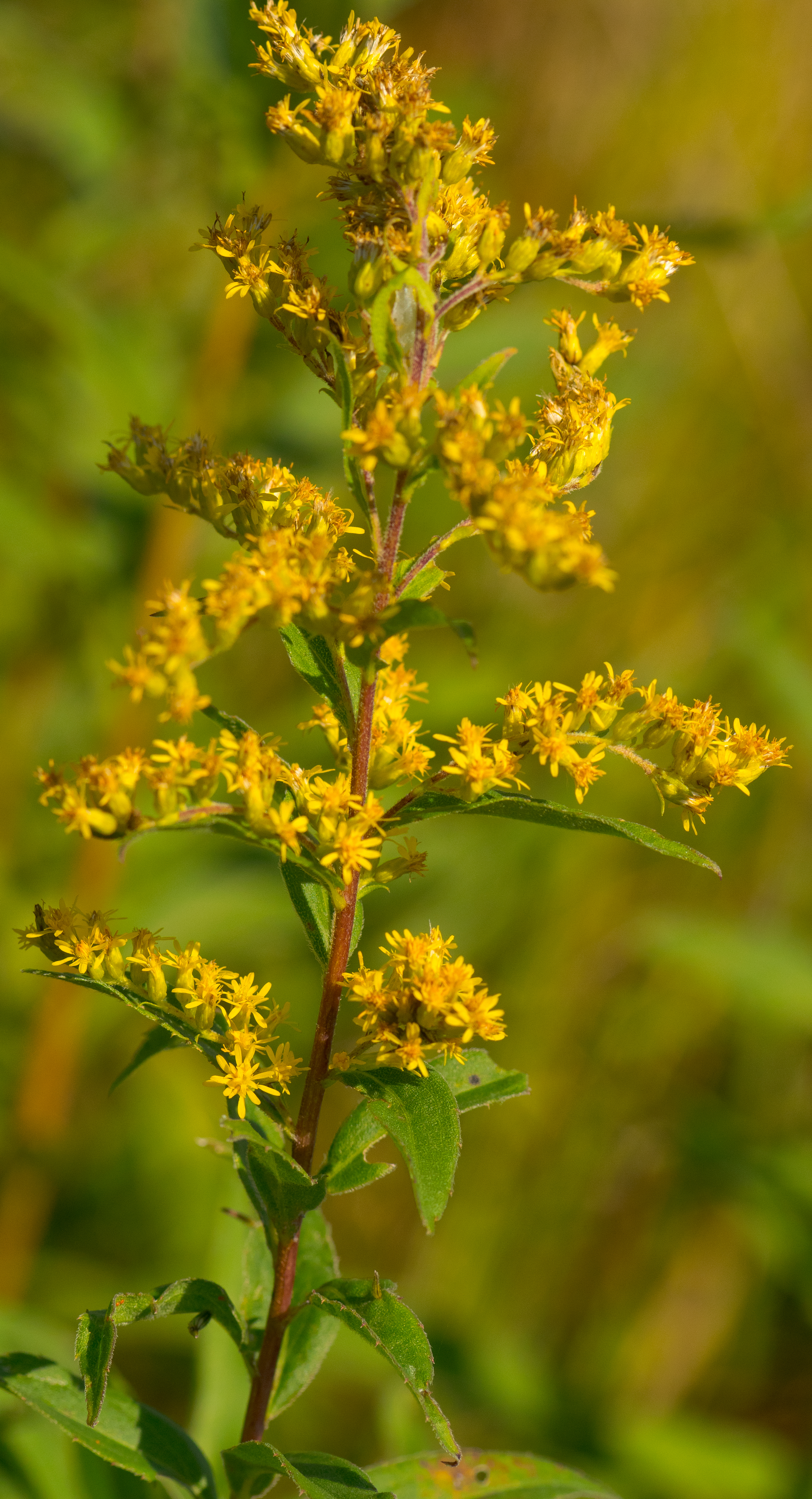

Conservation status
- Secure (NatureServe)

Scientific classification
- Kingdom: Plantae
- Clade: Tracheophytes
- Clade: Angiosperms
- Clade: Eudicots
- Clade: Asterids
- Order: Asterales
- Family: Asteraceae
- Genus: Solidago
- Species: S. speciosa

Binomial name
- Solidago speciosa Nutt.

Synonyms
- Synonymy: Aster speciosus (Nutt.) Kuntze; Solidago pallida (Porter) Rydb.; Solidago harperi Mack. ex Small; Solidago jejunifolia E.S.Steele; Solidago chandonnetii E.S.Steele, syn of var. rigidiuscula; Solidago rigidiuscula (Torr. & A.Gray) Porter, syn of var. rigidiuscula; Solidago venulosa Greene, syn of var. rigidiuscula

= Solidago speciosa =

Species of flowering plant

Solidago speciosa, the showy goldenrod, is a North American species of flowering plants in the family Asteraceae. It grows in the province of Ontario in central Canada, as well as in the eastern and central United States (from the Atlantic coast west as far as the Great Plains, so from Maine to Georgia (except Delaware) west as far as Texas, Nebraska, and the Dakotas).

Solidago speciosa is a perennial herb up to 200 cm (80 inches, over 6 feet) tall, producing a thick underground caudex. One plant can produce as many as 5 stems, each with up to 300 small yellow flower heads.

Varieties

- Solidago speciosa var. rigidiuscula Torr. & A.Gray - mostly in western portions of range
- Solidago speciosa var. speciosa - mostly in eastern portions of range
