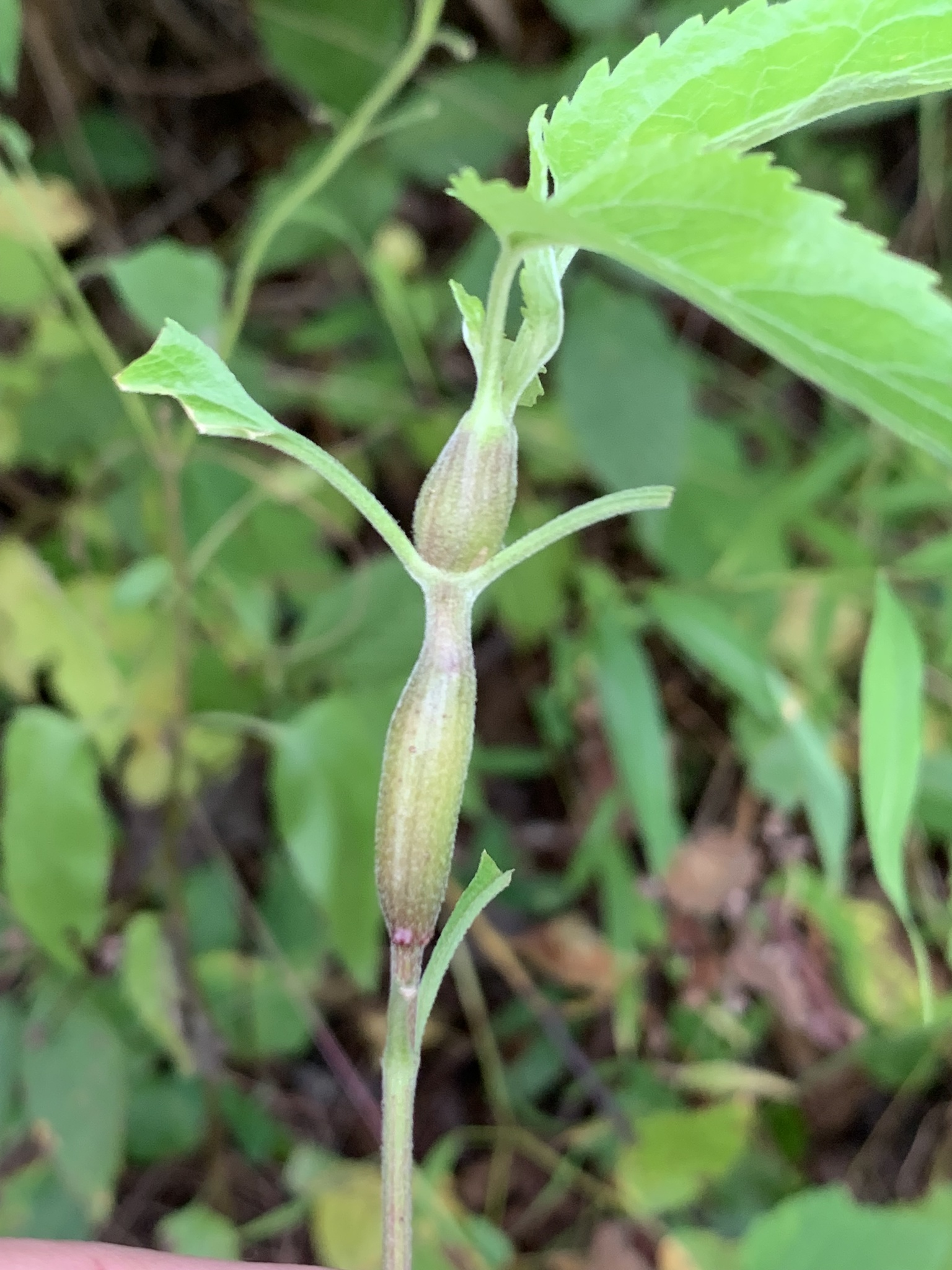
- Stem galls on Eupatorium sp. caused by Neolasioptera eupatorii

Scientific classification
- Domain: Eukaryota
- Kingdom: Animalia
- Phylum: Arthropoda
- Class: Insecta
- Order: Diptera
- Family: Cecidomyiidae
- Genus: Neolasioptera
- Species: N. eupatorii

Binomial name
- Neolasioptera eupatorii (Felt, 1907)

Synonyms
- Choristoneura eupatorii Felt, 1907

= Neolasioptera eupatorii =

Species of fly

Neolasioptera eupatorii is a species of gall midges, insects in the family Cecidomyiidae.
