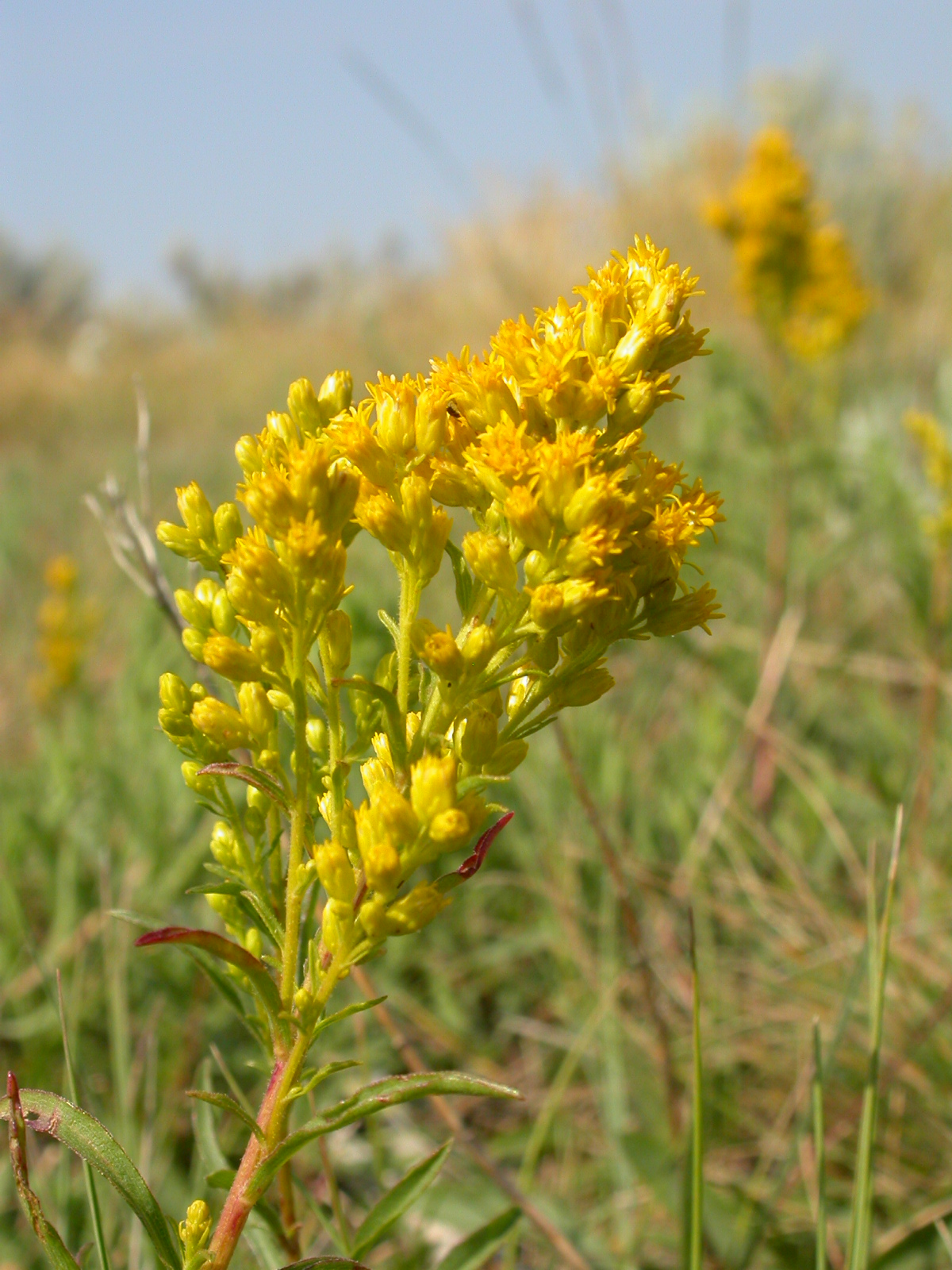
- Solidago missouriensis in Bozeman, Montana

Conservation status
- Secure (NatureServe)

Scientific classification
- Kingdom: Plantae
- Clade: Embryophytes
- Clade: Tracheophytes
- Clade: Spermatophytes
- Clade: Angiosperms
- Clade: Eudicots
- Clade: Asterids
- Order: Asterales
- Family: Asteraceae
- Genus: Solidago
- Species: S. missouriensis

Binomial name
- Solidago missouriensis Nutt.

Synonyms
- Synonymy: Aster marshallii Kuntze; Aster missuriensis (Nutt.) Kuntze; Aster tolmieanus (A.Gray) Kuntze; Doria concinna (A.Nelson) Lunell; Doria glaberrima (M.Martens) Lunell; Solidago concinna A.Nelson; Solidago duriuscula Greene; Solidago glaberrima M.Martens; Solidago glaucophylla Rydb.; Solidago hapemaniana Rydb.; Solidago marshallii Rothr.; Solidago moritura E.S.Steele; Solidago tenuissima Wooton & Standl.; Solidago tolmieana A.Gray

= Solidago missouriensis =

Species of flowering plant

Solidago missouriensis is a species of flowering plant in the family Asteraceae known by the common names Missouri goldenrod and prairie goldenrod. It is native to North America, where it is widespread across much of Canada, the United States, and northern Mexico. It grows from British Columbia east to Manitoba, south as far as Sonora, Coahuila, Texas, and Mississippi.

== Description ==
Solidago missouriensis is variable in appearance, and there are a number of varieties. In general, it is a perennial herb growing from an underground caudex or rhizome, or both. It reaches one meter (40 inches) in maximum height. The roots may reach 2 m (6.6 ft) deep in the soil. The rigid leaves are up to 30 centimeters (12 inches) long, becoming smaller farther up the stem. The inflorescence is a branching panicle of many yellow flower heads at the top of the stem, sometimes with over 200 small heads. Each head contains about 5-14 yellow ray florets a few millimeters long surrounding 6-20 disc florets. The fruit is an achene tipped with a pappus of bristles.

== Distribution and habitat ==
Solidago missouriensis can be found in many types of habitat. It is common on the Great Plains. It grows preferably in dry, open habitat and can occur at high elevations. It colonizes disturbed soils. During the Dust Bowl-era drought, when many of the native grasses and plants died, the goldenrod flourished in the dry, cleared soil. As the drought ended and the grasses returned, the goldenrod became less common, disappearing in many areas. It grows in soils turned over by burrowing animals and on roadsides and mining sites.

The goldenrod is common in a number of regions, including tallgrass prairie in west-central Missouri, sandhills prairie in southeastern North Dakota, the Cypress Hills of southeastern Alberta, riparian habitat in northwestern Montana, and the sand barrens of northern Wisconsin.

=== Galls ===
This species is host to the following insect induced gall:

- Asteromyia carbonifera (Osten Sacken, 1862)

external link to gallformers
