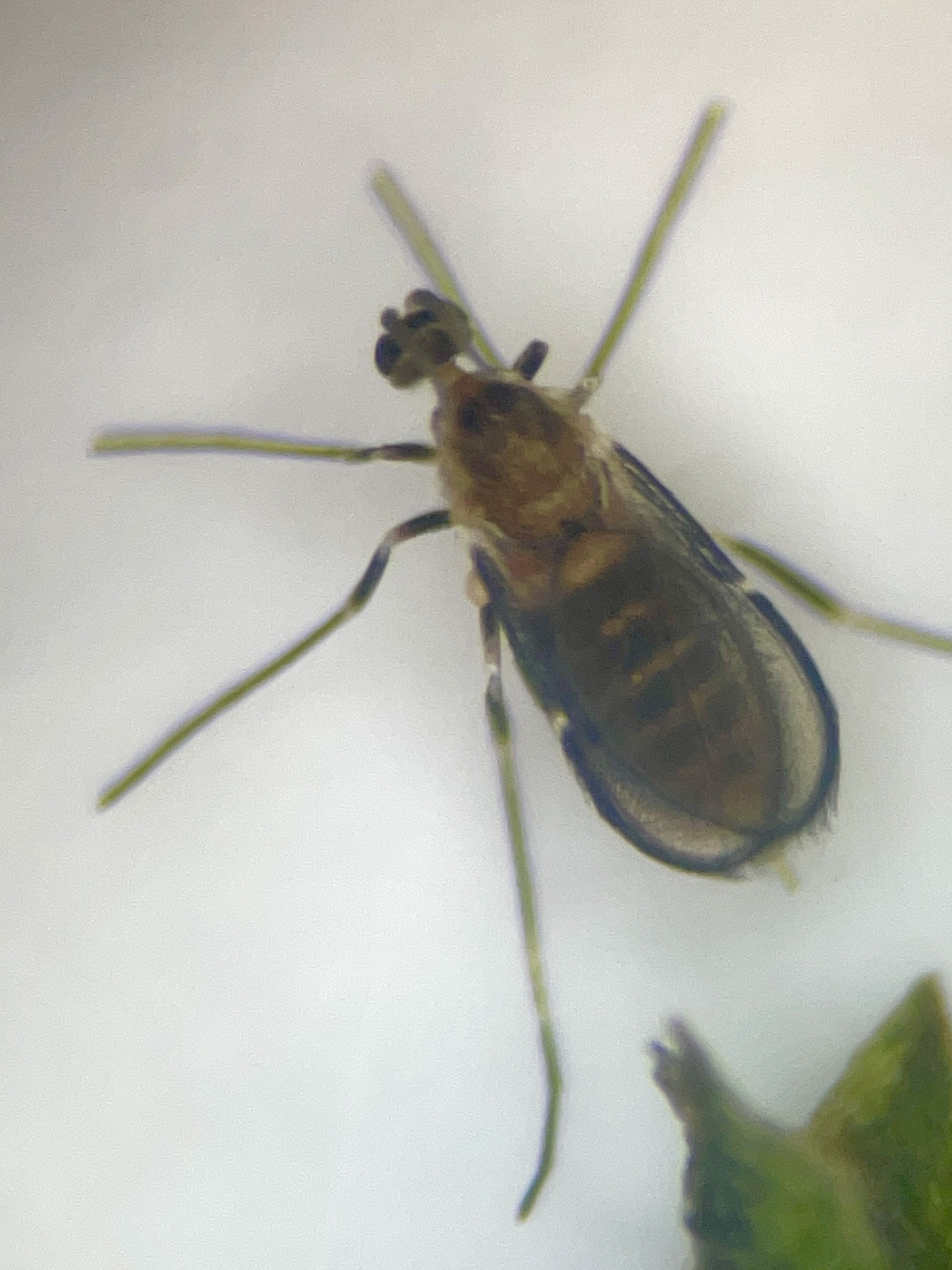
- Neolasioptera lathami

Scientific classification
- Domain: Eukaryota
- Kingdom: Animalia
- Phylum: Arthropoda
- Class: Insecta
- Order: Diptera
- Family: Cecidomyiidae
- Tribe: Alycaulini
- Genus: Neolasioptera

= Neolasioptera =

Genus of flies

Neolasioptera is a genus of gall midges in the family Cecidomyiidae. There are at least 130 described species in the genus Neolasioptera.

== Selected species ==
The following species are included in the genus Neolasioptera:

- Neolasioptera allioniae
- Neolasioptera boehmeriae
- Neolasioptera clematidis
- Neolasioptera convolvuli
- Neolasioptera cornicola
- Neolasioptera desmodii
- Neolasioptera eupatorii
- Neolasioptera farinosa
- Neolasioptera impatientifolia
- Neolasioptera lycopi
- Neolasioptera monardi
- Neolasioptera nodulosa
- Neolasioptera perfoliata
- Neolasioptera vernoniae
- Neolasioptera vitinea
- Neolasioptera willistoni
