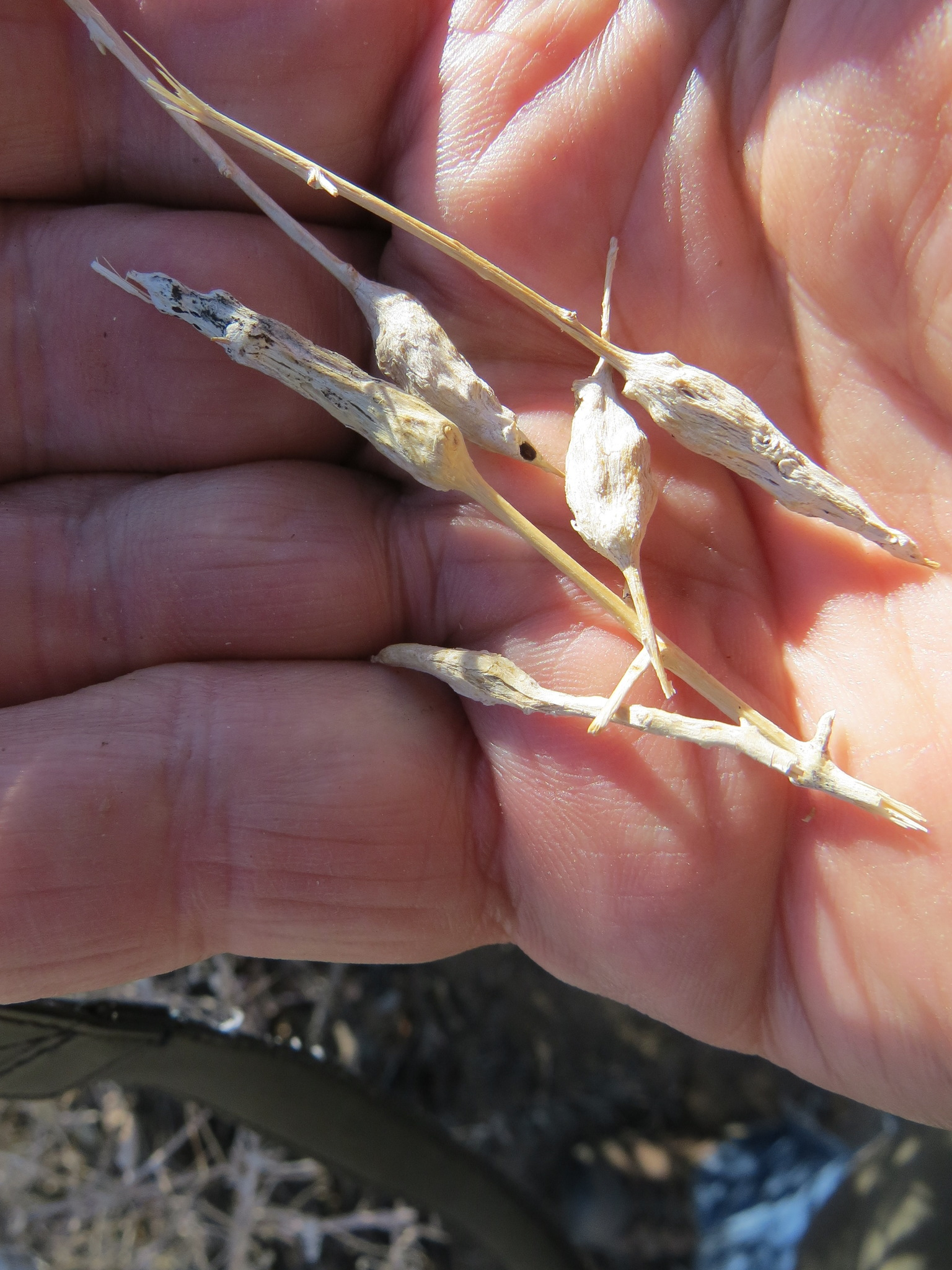
- Stem galls on cattle saltbush caused by Neolasioptera willistoni

Scientific classification
- Domain: Eukaryota
- Kingdom: Animalia
- Phylum: Arthropoda
- Class: Insecta
- Order: Diptera
- Family: Cecidomyiidae
- Genus: Neolasioptera
- Species: N. willistoni

Binomial name
- Neolasioptera willistoni (Cockerell, 1898)

Synonyms
- Lasioptera willistoni Cockerell, 1898

= Neolasioptera willistoni =

Species of fly

Neolasioptera willistoni is a species of gall midge in the family Cecidomyiidae.
