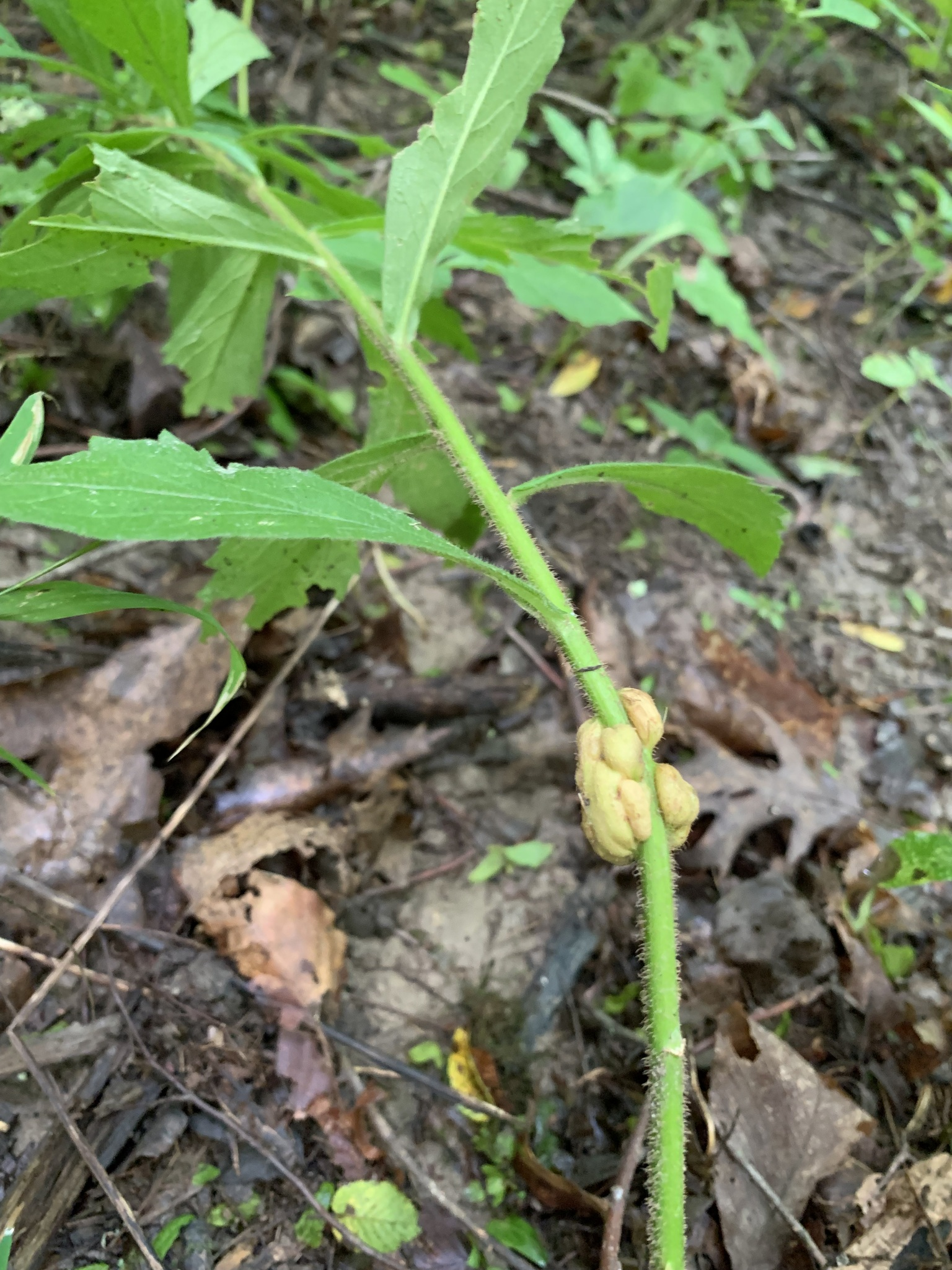
- A. tumifica stem gall

Scientific classification
- Domain: Eukaryota
- Kingdom: Animalia
- Phylum: Arthropoda
- Class: Insecta
- Order: Diptera
- Family: Cecidomyiidae
- Genus: Asteromyia
- Species: A. tumifica

Binomial name
- Asteromyia tumifica (Beutenmuller, 1907)

Synonyms
- Lasioptera tumifica Beutenmuller, 1907

= Asteromyia tumifica =

Species of fly

Asteromyia tumifica is a species of gall midges in the family Cecidomyiidae. This fly causes blister galls on green stems at the base of goldenrod stems. It has a fungal symbiont responsible for forming a black, hard cast around full-grown larvae. The fungi are transported by the female midges in the ovipositor and spores are transferred at the time of egg insertion into the stem.
