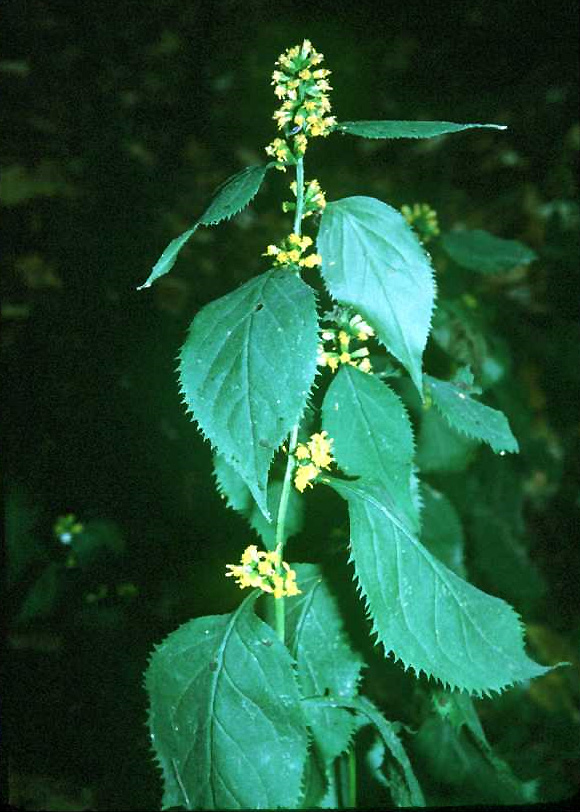

Scientific classification
- Kingdom: Plantae
- Clade: Tracheophytes
- Clade: Angiosperms
- Clade: Eudicots
- Clade: Asterids
- Order: Asterales
- Family: Asteraceae
- Genus: Solidago
- Species: S. flexicaulis

Binomial name
- Solidago flexicaulis L.

Synonyms
- Aster latifolius (L.) Kuntze 1891 not Mill. 1768; Doria flexicaulis (L.) Lunell; Solidago latifolia L.; Solidago scrophulariifolia Mill.

= Solidago flexicaulis =

Species of plant

Solidago flexicaulis, the broadleaved goldenrod, or zigzag goldenrod, is a North American species of herbaceous perennial plants in the family Asteraceae. It is native to the eastern and central parts of the United States and Canada, from Nova Scotia west to Ontario and the Dakotas, and south as far as Alabama and Louisiana. It grows in a variety of habitats including mesic upland forests, well drained floodplain forests, seepage swamp hummocks, and rocky woodlands.

The plant is called the "zigzag goldenrod" because the thin, wiry stem zigs and zags back and forth, changing direction at each node (leaf attachment point). The plant bears sometimes as many as 250 small yellow flower heads, some at the end of the stem, others in the axils of the leaves. The leaves are very broad, almost round, but with an elongated tip at the end and large teeth along the edges.

Solidago flexicaulis shares some similarities to Solidago albopilosa, both molecularly and physically. There is some evidence indicating that the plant is an ancient autopolyploid of S. flexicaulis.

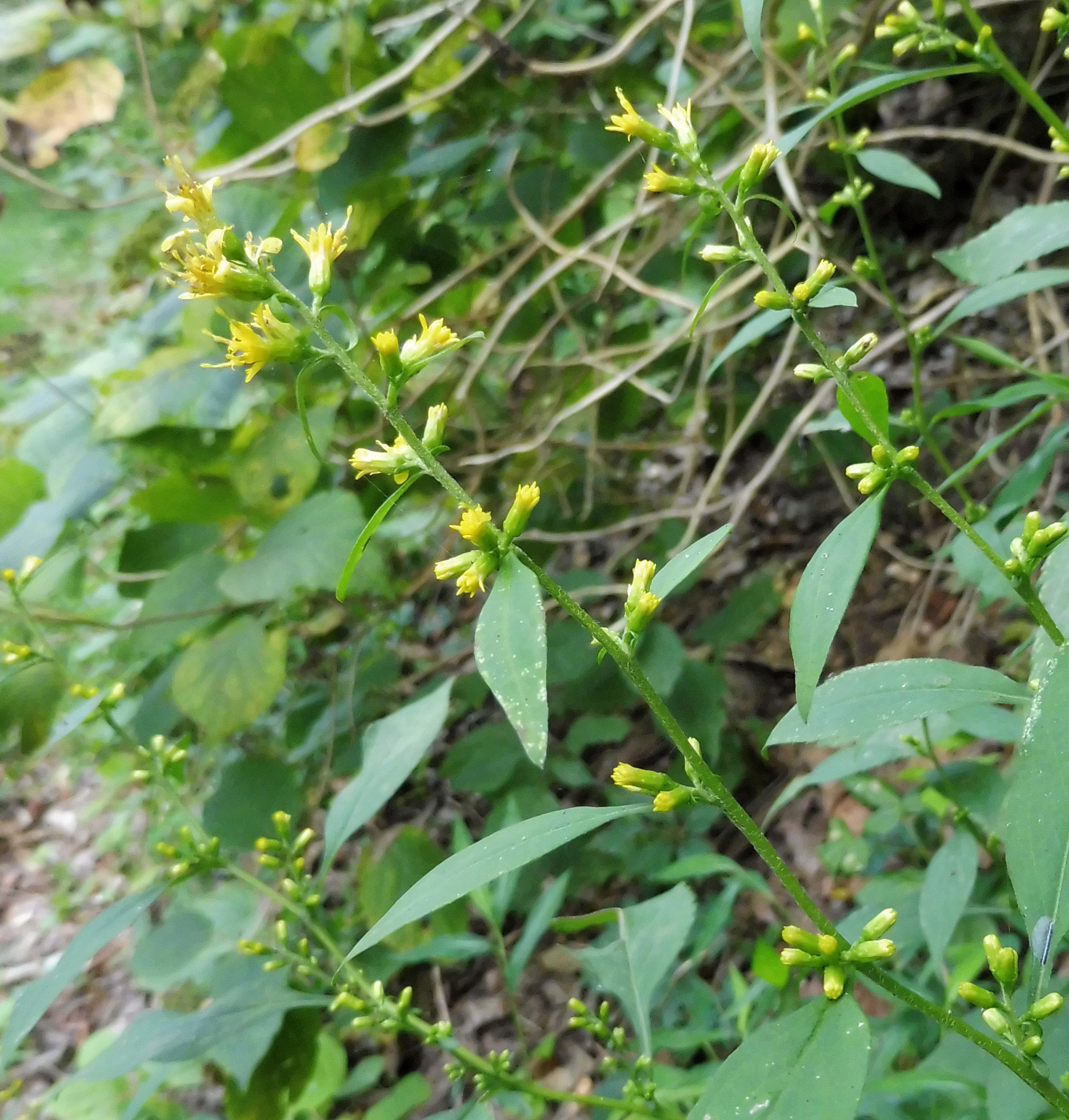
Photo showing elongated inflorescence

== Galls ==
This species is host to the following insect induced galls:

- Asteromyia modesta (Felt, 1907)
- Gnorimoschema gallaesolidaginis (Fitch, 1855)

external link to gallformers
