= Neolasioptera allioniae =

Scientific classification
- Kingdom: Animalia
- Phylum: Arthropoda
- Class: Insecta
- Order: Diptera
- Family: Cecidomyiidae
- Genus: Neolasioptera
- Species: N. allioniae

Binomial name
- Neolasioptera allioniae (Felt, 1911)

Synonyms
- Lasioptera allioniae Felt, 1911

Species of fly

Neolasioptera allioniae is a species of gall midges, insects in the family Cecidomyiidae. It forms galls in Allionia (Nyctaginaceae), possibly also other species in the family including Mirabilis nyctaginea. It occurs in the United States of America from Colorado to Texas, possibly more widely (as its host plants).
