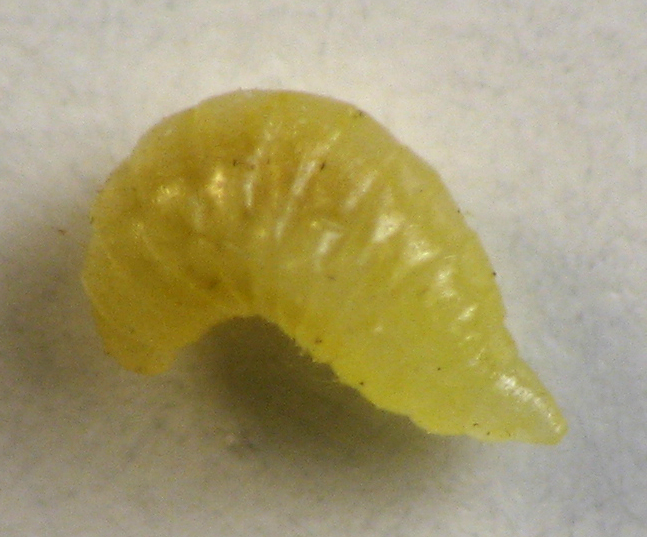
- Larva

Scientific classification
- Kingdom: Animalia
- Phylum: Arthropoda
- Clade: Pancrustacea
- Class: Insecta
- Order: Diptera
- Family: Cecidomyiidae
- Genus: Asteromyia
- Species: A. carbonifera

Binomial name
- Asteromyia carbonifera (Osten Sacken, 1862)

Synonyms
- Baldratia flavoanulata Felt, 1908; Baldratia flavoscuta Felt, 1908; Baldratia socialis Felt, 1908; Baldratia squarrosae Felt, 1908; Cecidomyia carbonifera Osten Sacken, 1862; Choristoneura abnormis Felt, 1907; Choristoneura albomaculata Felt, 1907; Choristoneura convoluta Felt, 1907; Choristoneura flavolunata Felt, 1907; Lasioptera rosea Felt, 1907; Lasioptera rubra Felt, 1907; Lasioptera tuberculata Felt, 1907

= Asteromyia carbonifera =

Species of fly

Asteromyia carbonifera is a species of gall midges in the family Cecidomyiidae. It creates galls on Solidago plants. Females can lay up to 300 eggs at a time and often collect conidia of the fungus Botryosphaeria dothidea, which is deposited on the plant alongside the eggs. The larvae grow within the gall that the fungus creates, a form of mutualism.

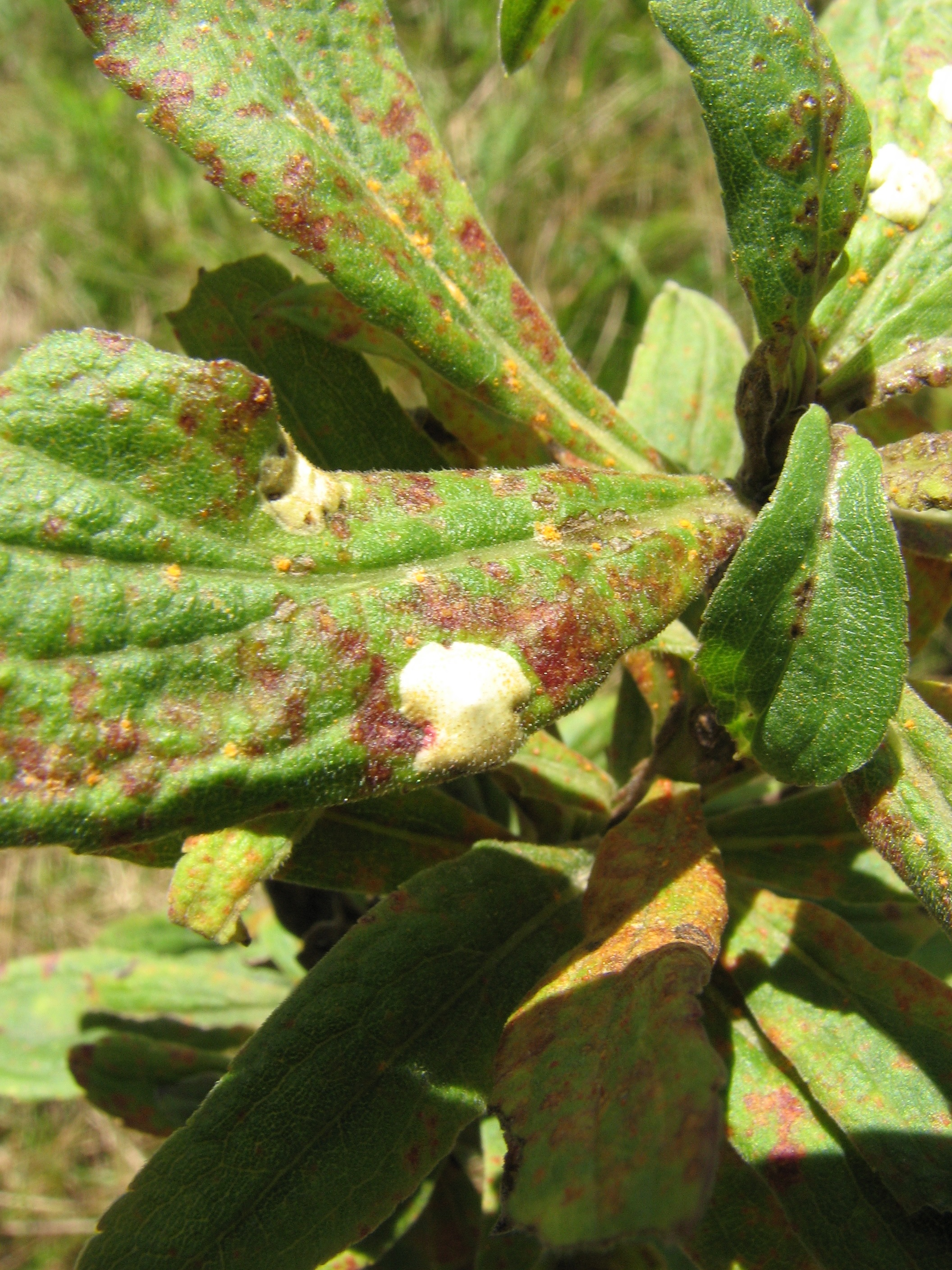
Gall on goldenrod

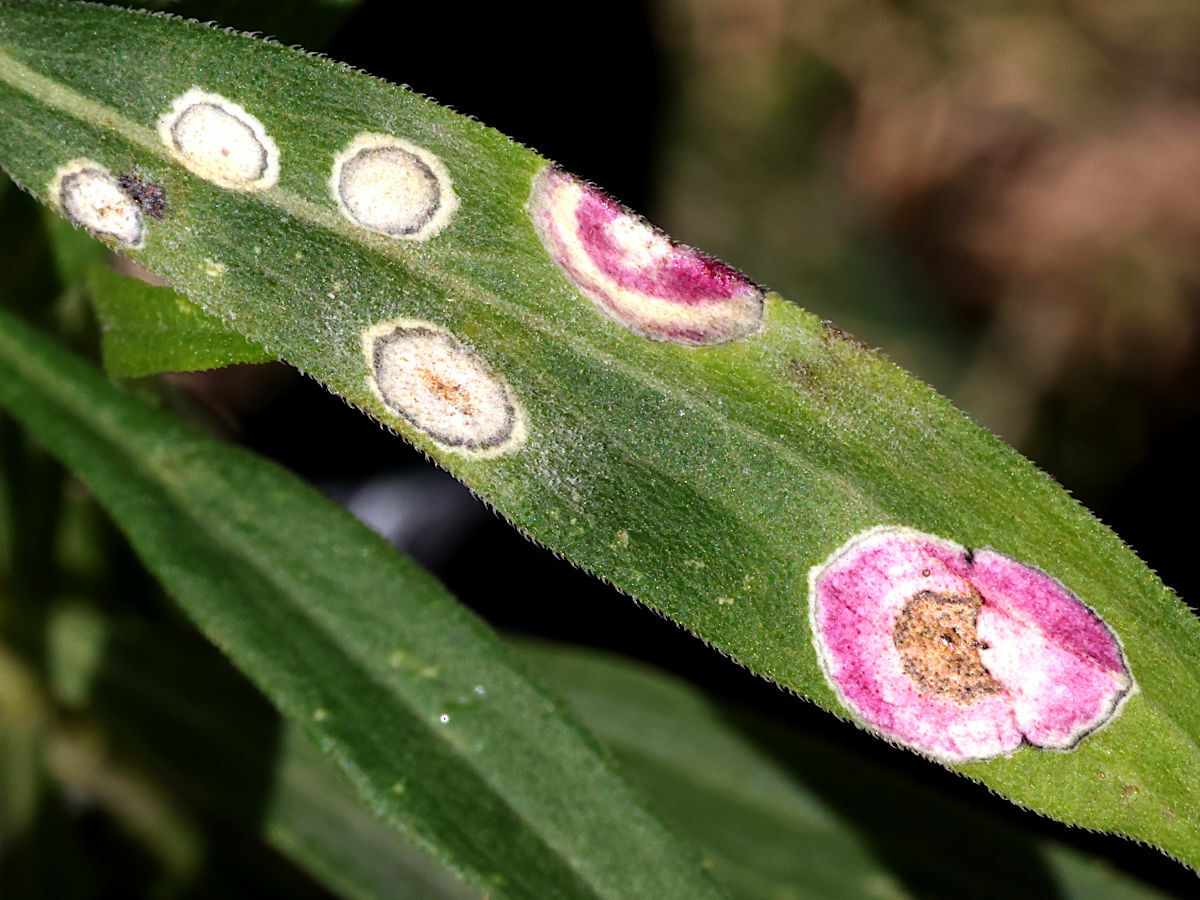
Galls on Solidago altissima
