= Alycaulini =

Scientific classification
- Domain: Eukaryota
- Kingdom: Animalia
- Phylum: Arthropoda
- Class: Insecta
- Order: Diptera
- Family: Cecidomyiidae
- Subfamily: Cecidomyiinae
- Tribe: Alycaulini

Tribe of flies

Alycaulini is a tribe of gall midges, insects in the family Cecidomyiidae. There are about 20 genera and at least 200 described species in Alycaulini.

== Genera ==
These genera belong to the tribe Alycaulini:

- Alycaulus Rübsaamen 1915a^{w} (3 species)
- Asteromyia Felt, 1910^{i c g b w} (9 species)
- Astictoneura Gagne, 1969^{i c g b w} (1 species)
- Atolasioptera Möhn 1975^{w} (1 species)
- Baccharomyia Tavares 1917b^{w} (5 species)
- Brachylasioptera Möhn 1964b^{w} (2 species)
- Calamomyia^{i c g w} (19 species)
- Chilophaga Gagne, 1969^{i c g b w} (5 species)
- Couridiplosis Maia 2004a^{w} (1 species)
- Edestochilus^{i c g w} (1 species)
- Edestosperma^{i c g w} (1 species)
- Epilasioptera Möhn 1964b^{w} (1 species)
- Geraldesia Tavares 1917b^{w} (3 species)
- Lobolasioptera Möhn 1964b^{w} (1 species)
- Marilasioptera Möhn 1975^{w} (1 species)
- Meunieriella Kieffer, 1909^{i c g b w} (21 species)
- Neolasioptera Felt, 1908^{i c g b w} (134 species)
- Protaplonyx^{i c g w} (1 species)
- Smilasioptera Möhn 1975^{w} (1 species)
- Xipholasioptera Gagné 1995c^{w} (1 species)

Data sources: i = ITIS, c = Catalogue of Life, g = GBIF, b = Bugguide.net w = Catalog of Cecidomyiidae of the World
