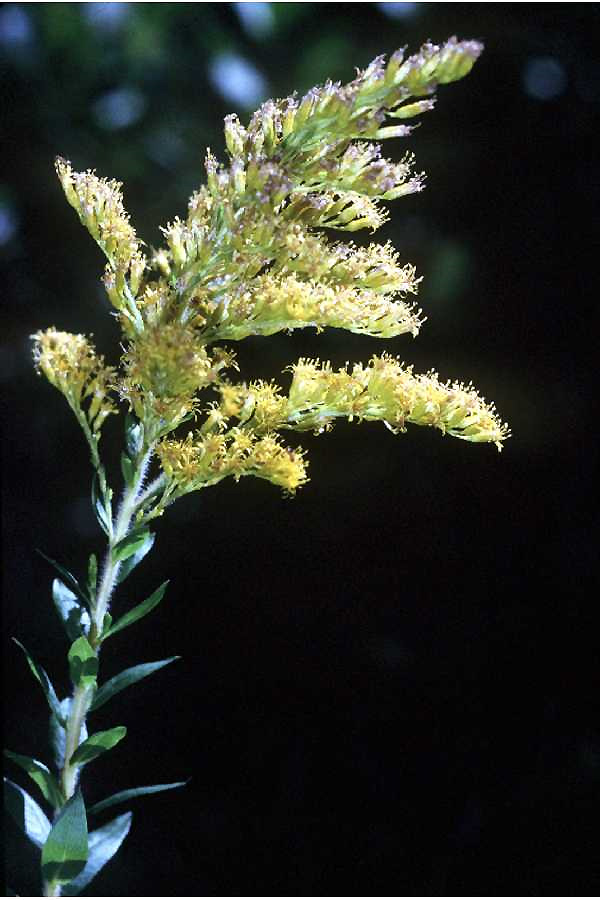

Scientific classification
- Kingdom: Plantae
- Clade: Tracheophytes
- Clade: Angiosperms
- Clade: Eudicots
- Clade: Asterids
- Order: Asterales
- Family: Asteraceae
- Genus: Solidago
- Species: S. fistulosa

Binomial name
- Solidago fistulosa Mill.

Synonyms
- Aster fistulosus (Miller) Kuntze; Solidago aspericaulis A. H. Moore

= Solidago fistulosa =

Species of plant

Solidago fistulosa, the pine barren goldenrod, is a plant species native to low-lying coastal areas of eastern North America. It grows in every state bordering on the Gulf of Mexico or on the Atlantic Ocean from Louisiana to New Jersey. It is generally found in bogs, along the edges of marshes, in drainage ditches, etc.

Solidago fistulosa is an herb up to 150 cm (5 feet) tall, spreading by underground rhizomes. It has winged petioles, broad leaf blades, and sometimes as many as 500 small yellow flower heads born in large branching arrays.

== Galls ==
This species is host to the following insect induced galls:

- Asteromyia carbonifera (Osten Sacken, 1862)
- Eurosta comma (Wiedemann, 1830)
- Eurosta floridensis Foote, 1977
- Schizomyia racemicola (Osten Sacken, 1862)

external link to gallformers
