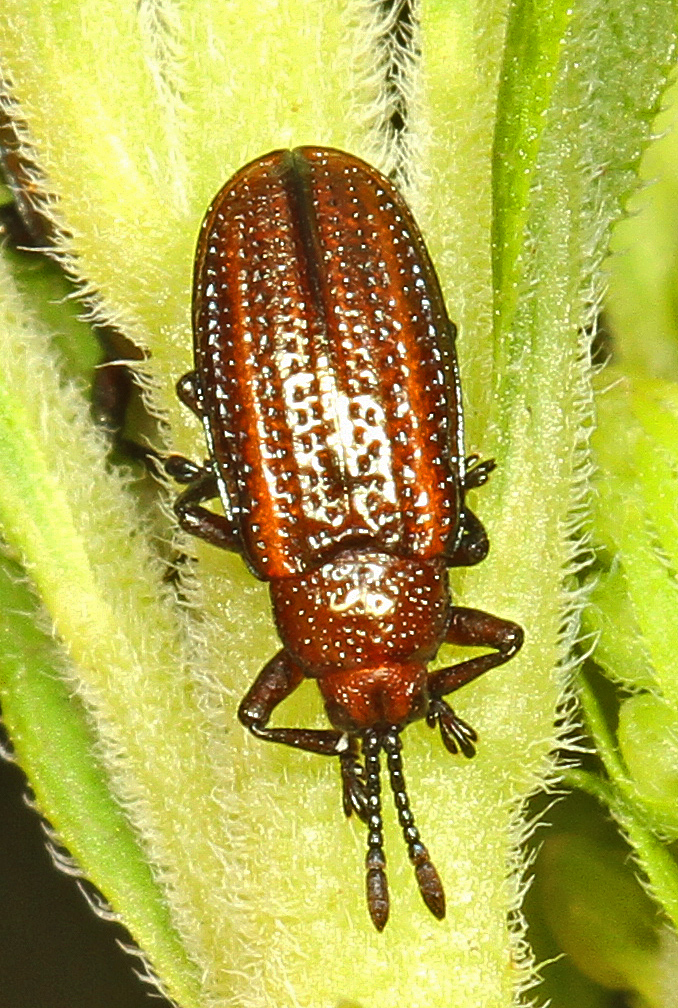

Scientific classification
- Kingdom: Animalia
- Phylum: Arthropoda
- Clade: Pancrustacea
- Class: Insecta
- Order: Coleoptera
- Suborder: Polyphaga
- Infraorder: Cucujiformia
- Family: Chrysomelidae
- Genus: Microrhopala
- Species: M. vittata

Binomial name
- Microrhopala vittata (Fabricius, 1798)

Synonyms
- Hispa vittata Fabricius 1798; Chalepus lineatus Thunberg 1805; Microrhopala laetula J. L. LeConte, 1859

= Microrhopala vittata =

Species of beetle

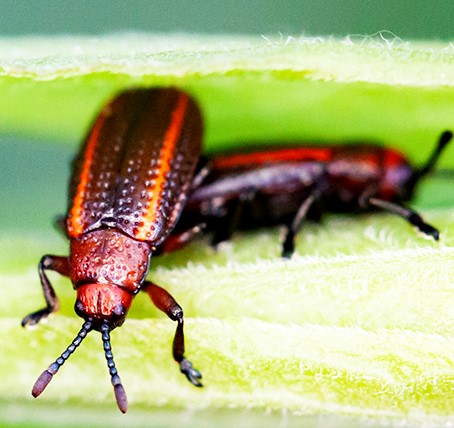
Goldenrod Leaf Miner (Microrhopala vittata) mating

Microrhopala vittata, the goldenrod leaf miner, is a species of leaf beetle in the family Chrysomelidae. It is found in North America, where it has been recorded from Canada (Alberta, British Columbia, Manitoba, New Brunswick, Ontario, Quebec, Saskatchewan) and the United States (Alabama, California, Colorado, Connecticut, Delaware, District of Columbia, Georgia, Idaho, Illinois, Indiana, Iowa, Kansas, Kentucky, Louisiana, Maine, Maryland, Massachusetts, Michigan, Minnesota, Mississippi, Missouri, Montana, Nebraska, New Hampshire, New Jersey, New Mexico, New York, North Carolina, North Dakota, Ohio, Oklahoma, Oregon, Pennsylvania, Rhode Island, South Carolina, South Dakota, Tennessee, Texas, Utah, Vermont, Virginia, Washington, West Virginia, Wisconsin, Wyoming).

== Description ==
Adults reach a length of about 5–6 mm. They vary in colour from red to black, with a lighter vitta on the elytron.

== Biology ==
They have been recorded feeding on Solidago altissima, Solidago graminifolia, Solidago canadensis, Solidago sempervirens, Solidago juncea, Solidago missouriensis, Solidago laciniatum, Solidago gigantea, Solidago mollis, Solidago rugosa, Solidago uliginosa, Solidago ulmifolia, Solidago rigida, Silphium perfoliatum, Silphium terebinthinaceum, Silphium laciniatum, Silphium perfoliatum and Euthamia graminifolia.

Adults emerge in April. Females lay their eggs in clusters of two to four and cover them in frass.

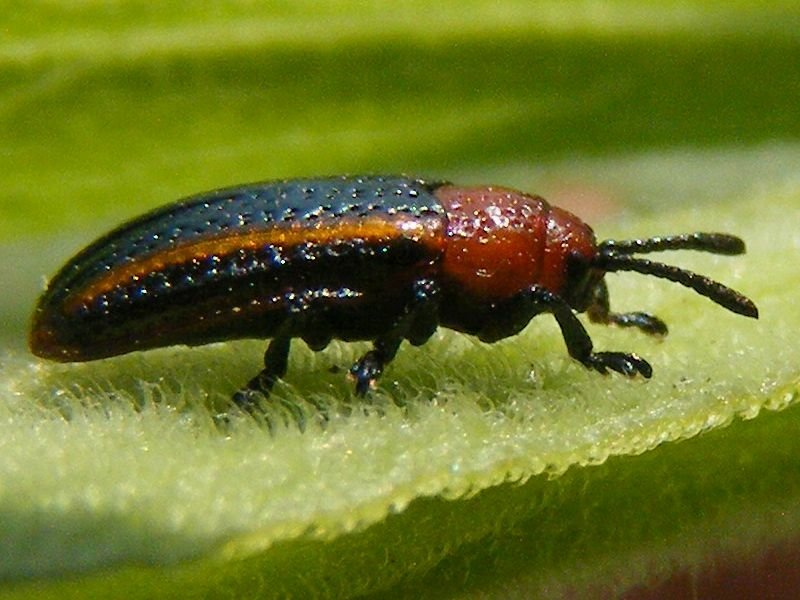
Goldenrod leaf miner, Microrhopala vittata

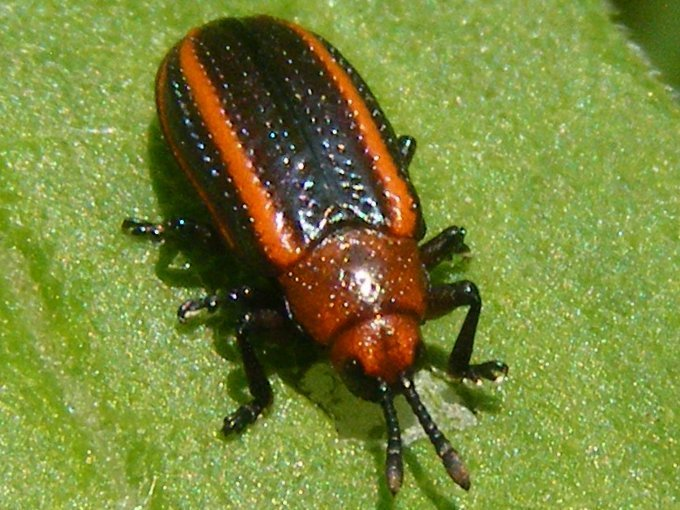
Goldenrod leaf miner, Microrhopala vittata
