= Mordellistena convicta =

Scientific classification
- Kingdom: Animalia
- Phylum: Arthropoda
- Clade: Pancrustacea
- Class: Insecta
- Order: Coleoptera
- Suborder: Polyphaga
- Infraorder: Cucujiformia
- Family: Mordellidae
- Genus: Mordellistena
- Species: M. convicta

Binomial name
- Mordellistena convicta LeConte, 1862

Species of beetle

Mordellistena convicta is a beetle in the genus Mordellistena of the family Mordellidae. It was described in 1862 by John Lawrence LeConte. It is an inquiline known to inhabit the galls of the goldenrod gall fly, wherein the beetle both feeds on the plant tissue and usually consumes the fly larvae inside the gall.
