= Aster simplex =

Aster simplex may refer to:

- Aster pseudosimplex (formerly Aster simplex Chang)
- Symphyotrichum lanceolatum (formerly Aster simplex Willd.)
