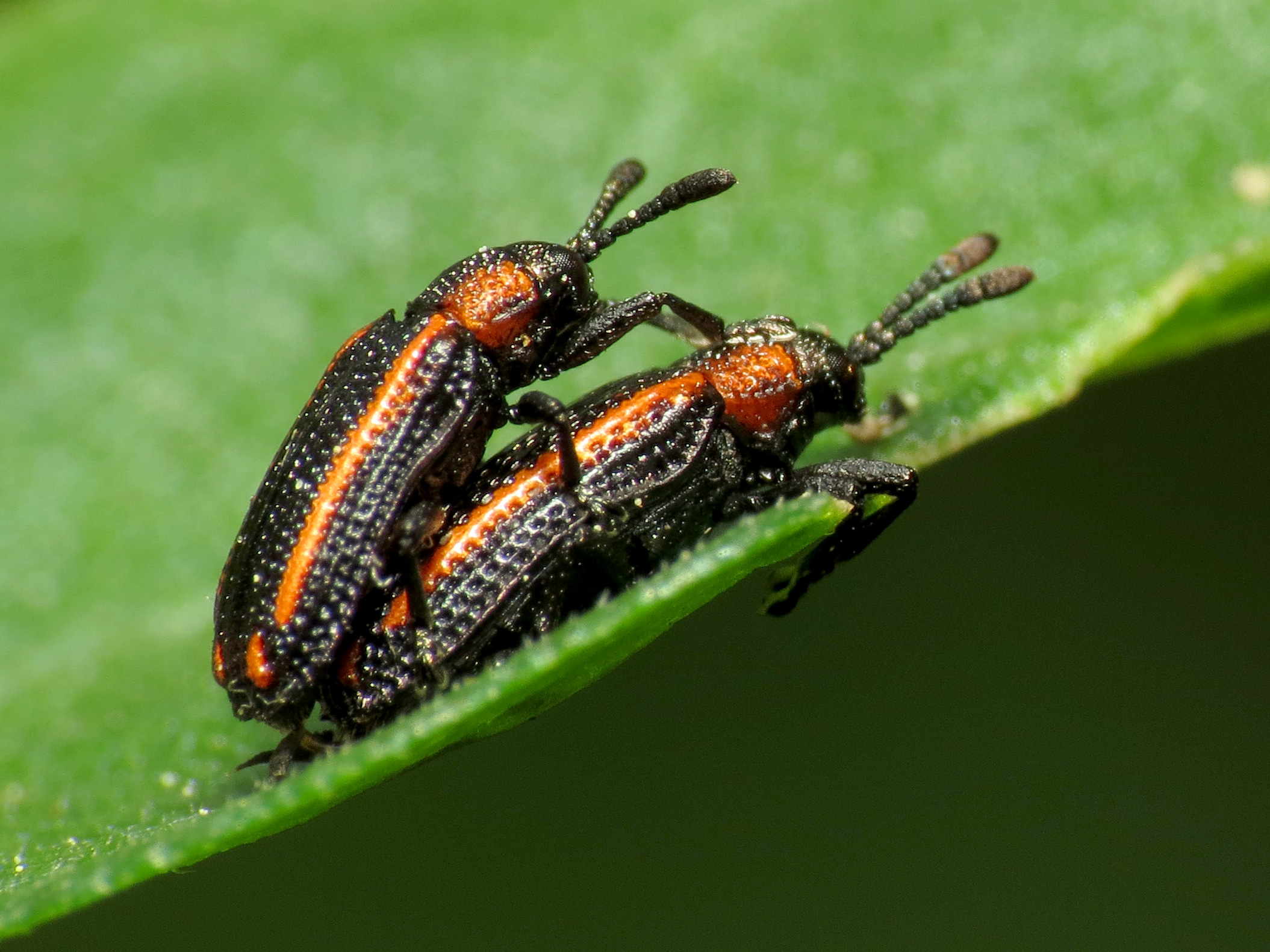
- Pair of breeding Microrhopala xerene.

Scientific classification
- Kingdom: Animalia
- Phylum: Arthropoda
- Class: Insecta
- Order: Coleoptera
- Suborder: Polyphaga
- Infraorder: Cucujiformia
- Family: Chrysomelidae
- Genus: Microrhopala
- Species: M. xerene

Binomial name
- Microrhopala xerene (Newman, 1838)

Synonyms
- Hispa xerene Newman, 1838; Microrhopala interrupta Couper, 1865

= Microrhopala xerene =

Species of beetle

Microrhopala xerene is a species of leaf beetle in the family Chrysomelidae. It is found in North America, where it has been recorded from Canada (Alberta, British Columbia, Manitoba, New Brunswick, Nova Scotia, Ontario, Quebec, Saskatchewan) and the United States (Arkansas, Colorado, Connecticut, Delaware, District of Columbia, Florida, Georgia, Illinois, Indiana, Kansas, Kentucky, Maine, Maryland, Massachusetts, Michigan, Minnesota, Missouri, Nebraska, Nevada, New Hampshire, North Carolina, North Dakota, Oklahoma, Ohio, Pennsylvania, South Carolina, Tennessee, Utah, Vermont, Virginia, West Virginia, Wisconsin, Wyoming).

== Description ==
Adults reach a length of about 3.6-4.6 mm. Adults are black with orange to red markings on the pronotum and elytron.

== Biology ==
They have been recorded feeding on Solidago canadensis, Solidago caesia, Solidago juncea, Boltonia asteroides, Seriocarpus asteroides, Aster nova-angliae, Aster patens, Aster paternus, Aster puniceus, Symphyotrichum lanceolatum, Ambrosia chamissonis, Ambrosia psilostachya, Symphyotrichum chilensis, Symphyotrichum cordifolium and Dorllingeria umbellata.
