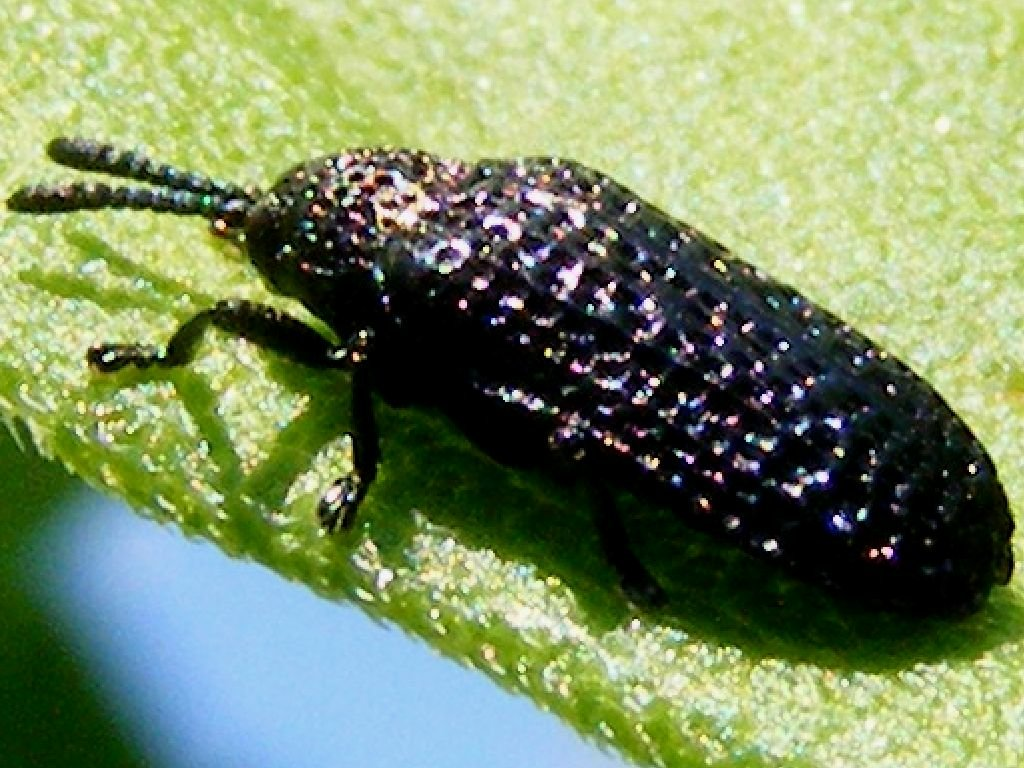

Scientific classification
- Kingdom: Animalia
- Phylum: Arthropoda
- Class: Insecta
- Order: Coleoptera
- Suborder: Polyphaga
- Infraorder: Cucujiformia
- Family: Chrysomelidae
- Genus: Microrhopala
- Species: M. excavata

Binomial name
- Microrhopala excavata (Olivier, 1808)

Synonyms
- Hispa excavata Olivier, 1808; Hispa cyanea Say, 1823

= Microrhopala excavata =

Species of beetle

Microrhopala excavata is a species of leaf beetle in the family Chrysomelidae. It is found in North America, where it has been recorded from Canada (Alberta, British Columbia, Manitoba, New Brunswick, Nova Scotia, Ontario, Prince Edward Island, Quebec, Saskatchewan) and the United States (Alabama, Arizona, Arkansas, Colorado, Connecticut, District of Columbia, Florida, Georgia, Illinois, Indiana, Iowa, Kansas, Kentucky, Louisiana, Maine, Maryland, Massachusetts, Michigan, Minnesota, Mississippi, Missouri, Montana, Nebraska, Nevada, New Hampshire, New Jersey, New Mexico, New York, North Carolina, North Dakota, Ohio, Oklahoma, Pennsylvania, Rhode Island, South Carolina, South Dakota, Tennessee, Texas, Utah, Vermont, Virginia, West Virginia, Wisconsin).

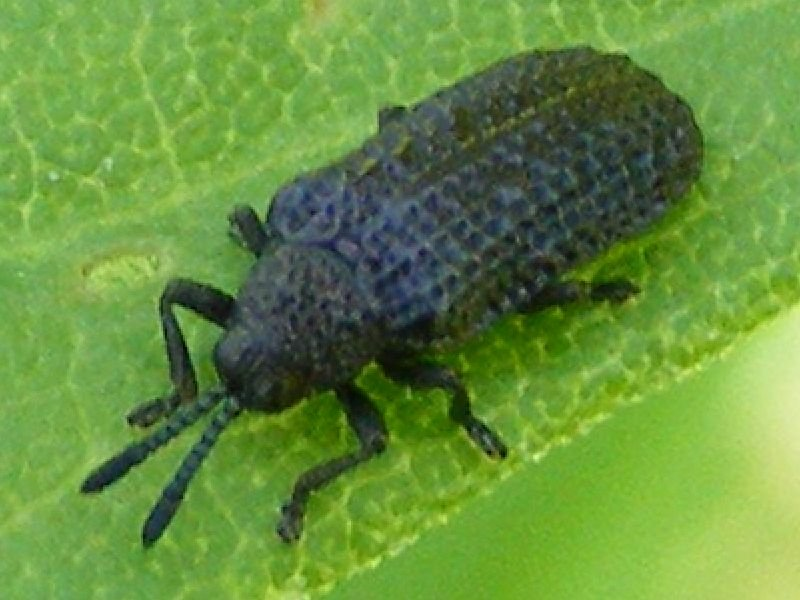

== Description ==
Adults reach a length of about 4-5.6 mm (males) and 4.6-6.6 mm (females). Adults are black, metallic green, blue or purple.

== Biology ==
They have been recorded feeding on Doellingeria umbellata, Solidago species (including Solidago drummondii), Helianthus annuus and Heterotheca villosa.

== Subspecies ==
These two subspecies belong to the species Microrhopala excavata:

- Microrhopala excavata cyanea (Say, 1824) (Alberta and Manitoba to Arizona, Texas, and Missouri)
- Microrhopala excavata excavata (Olivier, 1808) (Minnesota and Nova Scotia to Texas and Florida)
