= Microrhopala moseri =

Scientific classification
- Kingdom: Animalia
- Phylum: Arthropoda
- Class: Insecta
- Order: Coleoptera
- Suborder: Polyphaga
- Infraorder: Cucujiformia
- Family: Chrysomelidae
- Genus: Microrhopala
- Species: M. moseri

Binomial name
- Microrhopala moseri Uhmann, 1940

Species of beetle

Microrhopala moseri is a species of beetle of the family Chrysomelidae. It is found in Colombia.
