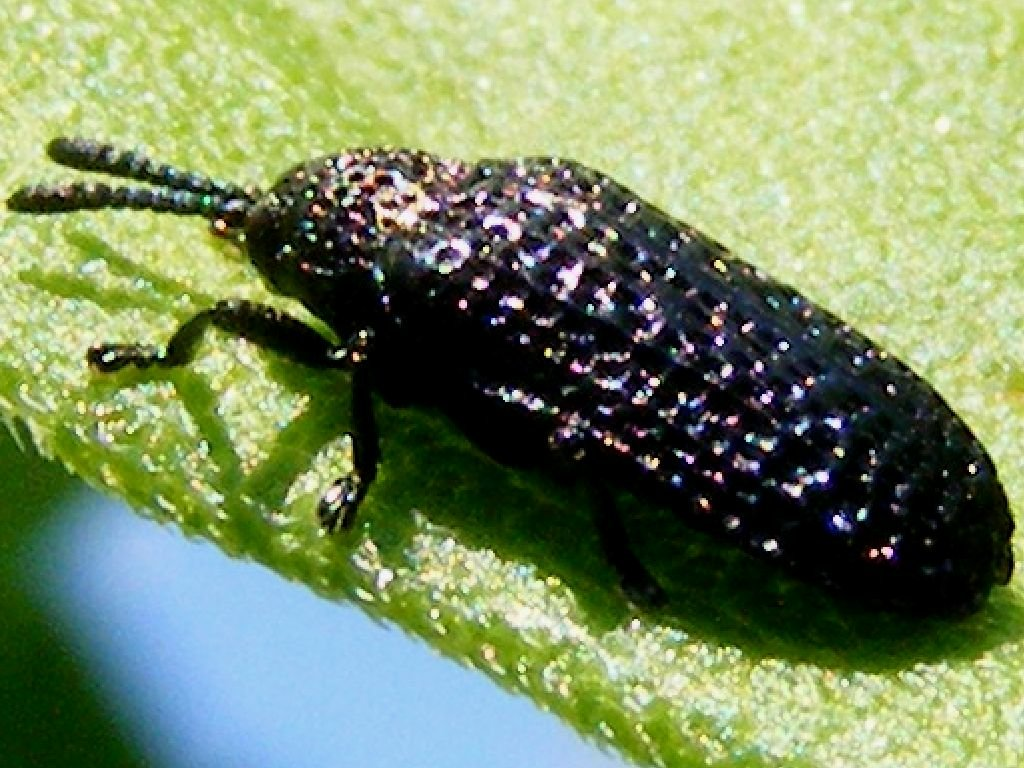
- Microrhopala excavata

Scientific classification
- Kingdom: Animalia
- Phylum: Arthropoda
- Clade: Pancrustacea
- Class: Insecta
- Order: Coleoptera
- Suborder: Polyphaga
- Infraorder: Cucujiformia
- Family: Chrysomelidae
- Tribe: Chalepini
- Genus: Microrhopala; Chevrolat in Dejean, 1836

= Microrhopala =

Genus of beetles

Microrhopala is a genus of tortoise beetles and hispines in the family Chrysomelidae. There are about 18 described species in Microrhopala.

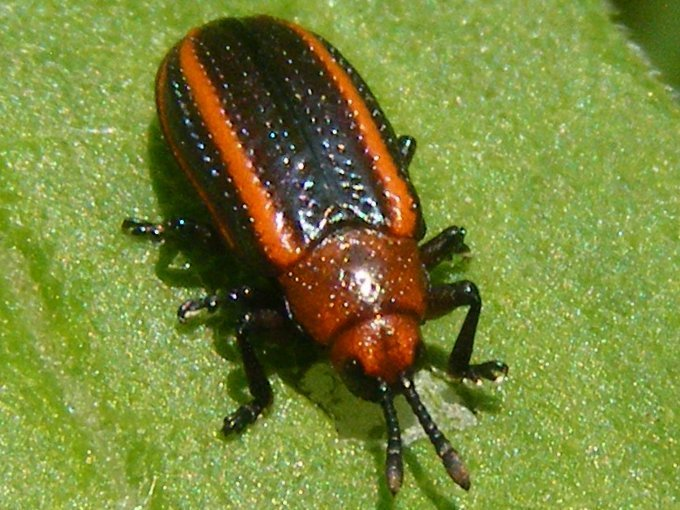
Microrhopala vittata

== Species ==
These 18 species belong to the genus Microrhopala:

- Microrhopala beckeri Weise, 1905
- Microrhopala ciliata Weise, 1911
- Microrhopala columbica Weise, 1911
- Microrhopala erebus (Newman, 1840)
- Microrhopala excavata (Olivier, 1808)
- Microrhopala floridana Schwarz, 1878
- Microrhopala hecate (Newman, 1840)
- Microrhopala inermis Staines, 2006
- Microrhopala moseri Uhmann, 1940
- Microrhopala perforata Baly, 1864
- Microrhopala pulchella Baly, 1864
- Microrhopala rileyi S. Clark, 1983
- Microrhopala rubrolineata (Mannerheim, 1843)
- Microrhopala sallei Baly, 1864
- Microrhopala suturalis Weise, 1905
- Microrhopala unicolor Champion, 1894
- Microrhopala vittata (Fabricius, 1798) (goldenrod leaf miner)
- Microrhopala xerene (Newman, 1838)
