= Microrhopala columbica =

Scientific classification
- Kingdom: Animalia
- Phylum: Arthropoda
- Class: Insecta
- Order: Coleoptera
- Suborder: Polyphaga
- Infraorder: Cucujiformia
- Family: Chrysomelidae
- Genus: Microrhopala
- Species: M. columbica

Binomial name
- Microrhopala columbica Weise, 1911

Species of beetle

Microrhopala columbica is a species of beetle of the family Chrysomelidae. It is found in Mexico.
