= Mordellistena unicolor =

Scientific classification
- Domain: Eukaryota
- Kingdom: Animalia
- Phylum: Arthropoda
- Class: Insecta
- Order: Coleoptera
- Suborder: Polyphaga
- Infraorder: Cucujiformia
- Family: Mordellidae
- Genus: Mordellistena
- Species: M. unicolor

Binomial name
- Mordellistena unicolor LeConte, 1862

Species of beetle

Mordellistena unicolor is a species of beetle in the genus Mordellistena of the family Mordellidae. It was described by John Lawrence LeConte in 1862. Larvae feed on gall tissue of the goldenrod gall fly and often consume the fly larvae within the gall as well.
