= Eurosta latifrons =

Scientific classification
- Kingdom: Animalia
- Phylum: Arthropoda
- Class: Insecta
- Order: Diptera
- Family: Tephritidae
- Subfamily: Tephritinae
- Tribe: Dithrycini
- Genus: Eurosta
- Species: E. latifrons

Binomial name
- Eurosta latifrons (Loew, 1862)

Synonyms
- Trypeta latifrons Loew, 1862; Eurostina confusa Curran, 1934

Species of fly

Eurosta latifrons is a species of tephritid or fruit flies in the genus Eurosta of the family Tephritidae.

== Distribution ==
United States.
