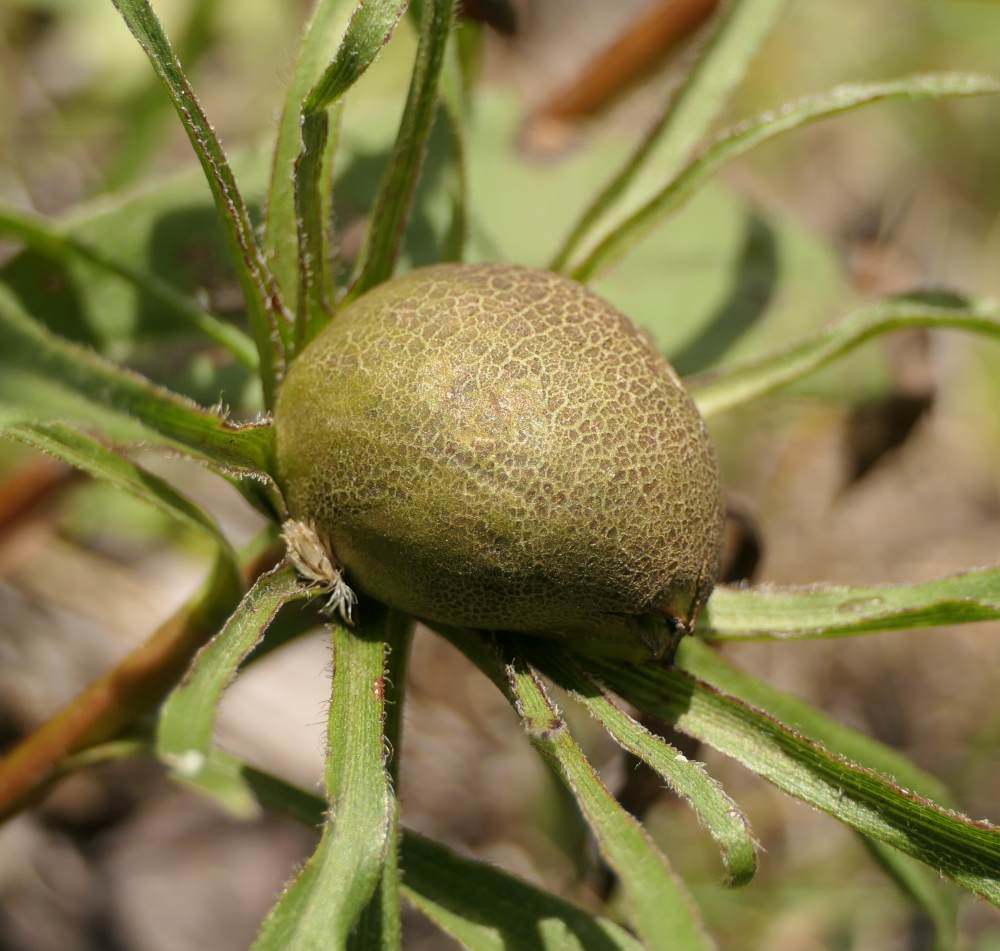
- R. hirtipes gall

Scientific classification
- Kingdom: Animalia
- Phylum: Arthropoda
- Class: Insecta
- Order: Diptera
- Family: Cecidomyiidae
- Genus: Rhopalomyia
- Species: R. hirtipes

Binomial name
- Rhopalomyia hirtipes (Osten Sacken, 1862)

Synonyms
- Cecidomyia hirtipes Osten Sacken, 1862

= Rhopalomyia hirtipes =

Species of fly

Rhopalomyia hirtipes is a species of gall midges, insects in the family Cecidomyiidae. They are found in the eastern part of North American on buds and stems of Solidago juncea

== Gall and biology ==
Galls of a this species form at the base of the stem in mid-June to mid-July, surrounded by a rosette of long leaves, and develop from vegetative buds. Young galls are wide at the base and have a tapered tip. As the gall matures, it becomes ovoid, 8-25mm long and 6-36mm wide, often changing its color from green to brownish. They contain 1-30 individual larvae in separate chambers, which face downwards while feeding. Before pupation in early August, the larvae turn to face upwards. The adult emerges from early to late September and galls are spongy, usually multi-chambered, and split open at the apex into several lobes. The galls can be difficult to locate, and were rare even in fields where S. juncea was the dominant plant.
