= Eurosta fenestrata =

Scientific classification
- Kingdom: Animalia
- Phylum: Arthropoda
- Class: Insecta
- Order: Diptera
- Family: Tephritidae
- Subfamily: Tephritinae
- Tribe: Dithrycini
- Genus: Eurosta
- Species: E. fenestrata

Binomial name
- Eurosta fenestrata Snow, 1894

Species of fly

Eurosta fenestrata is a species of tephritid or fruit flies in the genus Eurosta of the family Tephritidae.

== Distribution ==
Canada, United States.
