= Eurosta lateralis =

Scientific classification
- Kingdom: Animalia
- Phylum: Arthropoda
- Class: Insecta
- Order: Diptera
- Family: Tephritidae
- Subfamily: Tephritinae
- Tribe: Dithrycini
- Genus: Eurosta
- Species: E. lateralis

Binomial name
- Eurosta lateralis (Wiedemann, 1830)

Synonyms
- Trypeta lateralis Wiedemann, 1830; Trypeta donysa Walker, 1849; Eurosta nicholsoni Benjamin, 1934

Species of fly

Eurosta lateralis is a species of tephritid or fruit flies in the genus Eurosta of the family Tephritidae.

== Distribution ==
United States.
