= Microrhopala beckeri =

Scientific classification
- Kingdom: Animalia
- Phylum: Arthropoda
- Clade: Pancrustacea
- Class: Insecta
- Order: Coleoptera
- Suborder: Polyphaga
- Infraorder: Cucujiformia
- Family: Chrysomelidae
- Genus: Microrhopala
- Species: M. beckeri

Binomial name
- Microrhopala beckeri Weise, 1905

Species of beetle

Microrhopala beckeri is a species of beetle of the family Chrysomelidae. It is found in Mexico.
