= Microrhopala sallei =

Scientific classification
- Kingdom: Animalia
- Phylum: Arthropoda
- Class: Insecta
- Order: Coleoptera
- Suborder: Polyphaga
- Infraorder: Cucujiformia
- Family: Chrysomelidae
- Genus: Microrhopala
- Species: M. sallei

Binomial name
- Microrhopala sallei Baly, 1864

Species of beetle

Microrhopala sallei is a species of beetle of the family Chrysomelidae. It is found in Guatemala and Mexico (Oaxaca, Quintana Roo).
