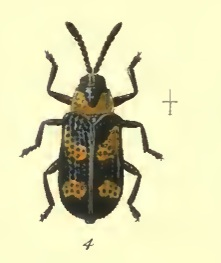

Scientific classification
- Kingdom: Animalia
- Phylum: Arthropoda
- Class: Insecta
- Order: Coleoptera
- Suborder: Polyphaga
- Infraorder: Cucujiformia
- Family: Chrysomelidae
- Genus: Microrhopala
- Species: M. perforata

Binomial name
- Microrhopala perforata Baly, 1864

Synonyms
- Microrhopala perforata submaculata Pic, 1932

= Microrhopala perforata =

Species of beetle

Microrhopala perforata is a species of beetle of the family Chrysomelidae. It is found in Colombia, Costa Rica, El Salvador, Guatemala, Mexico and Nicaragua.

== Biology ==
They have been recorded feeding on Salvia species and Marsypianthes chamaedrys.
