= Microrhopala floridana =

Scientific classification
- Kingdom: Animalia
- Phylum: Arthropoda
- Class: Insecta
- Order: Coleoptera
- Suborder: Polyphaga
- Infraorder: Cucujiformia
- Family: Chrysomelidae
- Genus: Microrhopala
- Species: M. floridana

Binomial name
- Microrhopala floridana Schwarz, 1878

Species of beetle

Microrhopala floridana is a species of leaf beetle in the family Chrysomelidae. It is found in North America, where it has been recorded from Alabama, the District of Columbia, Florida, Georgia, North Carolina and South Carolina.

== Description ==
Adults reach a length of about 3.4-4.5 mm (males) and 3.8-4.9 mm (females). Adults are black or sometimes metallic blue.

== Biology ==
They have been recorded feeding on Pityopsis graminifolia. Furthermore, adults have been collected on Lupinus diffusus.
