= Microrhopala hecate =

Scientific classification
- Kingdom: Animalia
- Phylum: Arthropoda
- Class: Insecta
- Order: Coleoptera
- Suborder: Polyphaga
- Infraorder: Cucujiformia
- Family: Chrysomelidae
- Genus: Microrhopala
- Species: M. hecate

Binomial name
- Microrhopala hecate (Newman, 1840)

Synonyms
- Hispa hecate Newman, 1841

Species of beetle

Microrhopala hecate is a species of beetle of the family Chrysomelidae. It is found in the United States (Georgia, Kentucky, Mississippi, North Carolina, Ohio, South Carolina, Texas, West Virginia).

== Description ==
Adults reach a length of about 4.1-4.9 mm (males) and 4.2-5.5 mm (females). Adults are black, mostly with a slight metallic red sheen on the elytron and pronotum.
