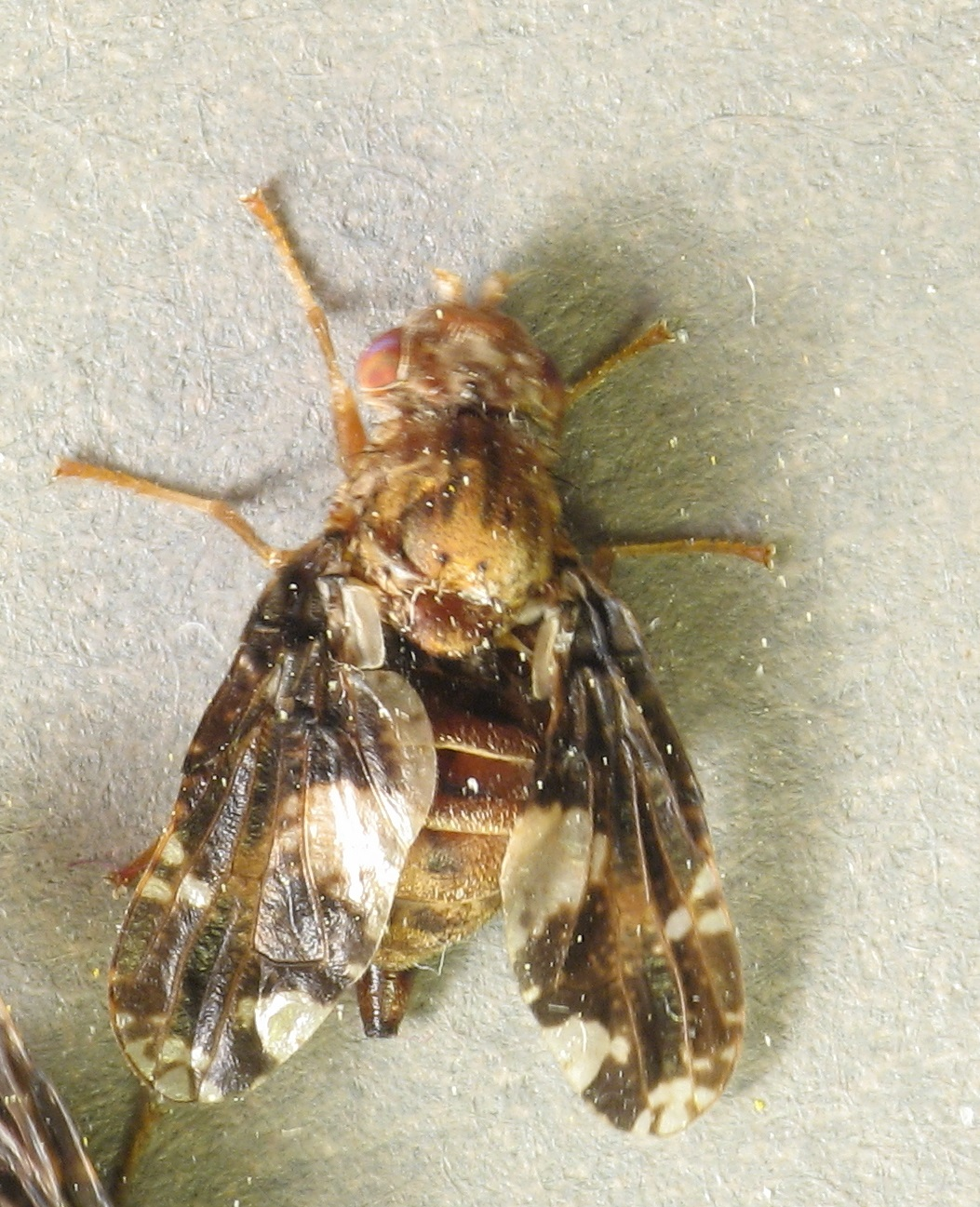
- Eurosta solidaginis female

Scientific classification
- Kingdom: Animalia
- Phylum: Arthropoda
- Class: Insecta
- Order: Diptera
- Family: Tephritidae
- Subfamily: Tephritinae
- Tribe: Dithrycini
- Genus: Eurosta; Loew, 1873

Type species
- Acinia solidaginis Fitch, 1855

Synonyms
- Durosta Cook, 1908; Eurostina Curran, 1932

= Eurosta =

Genus of flies

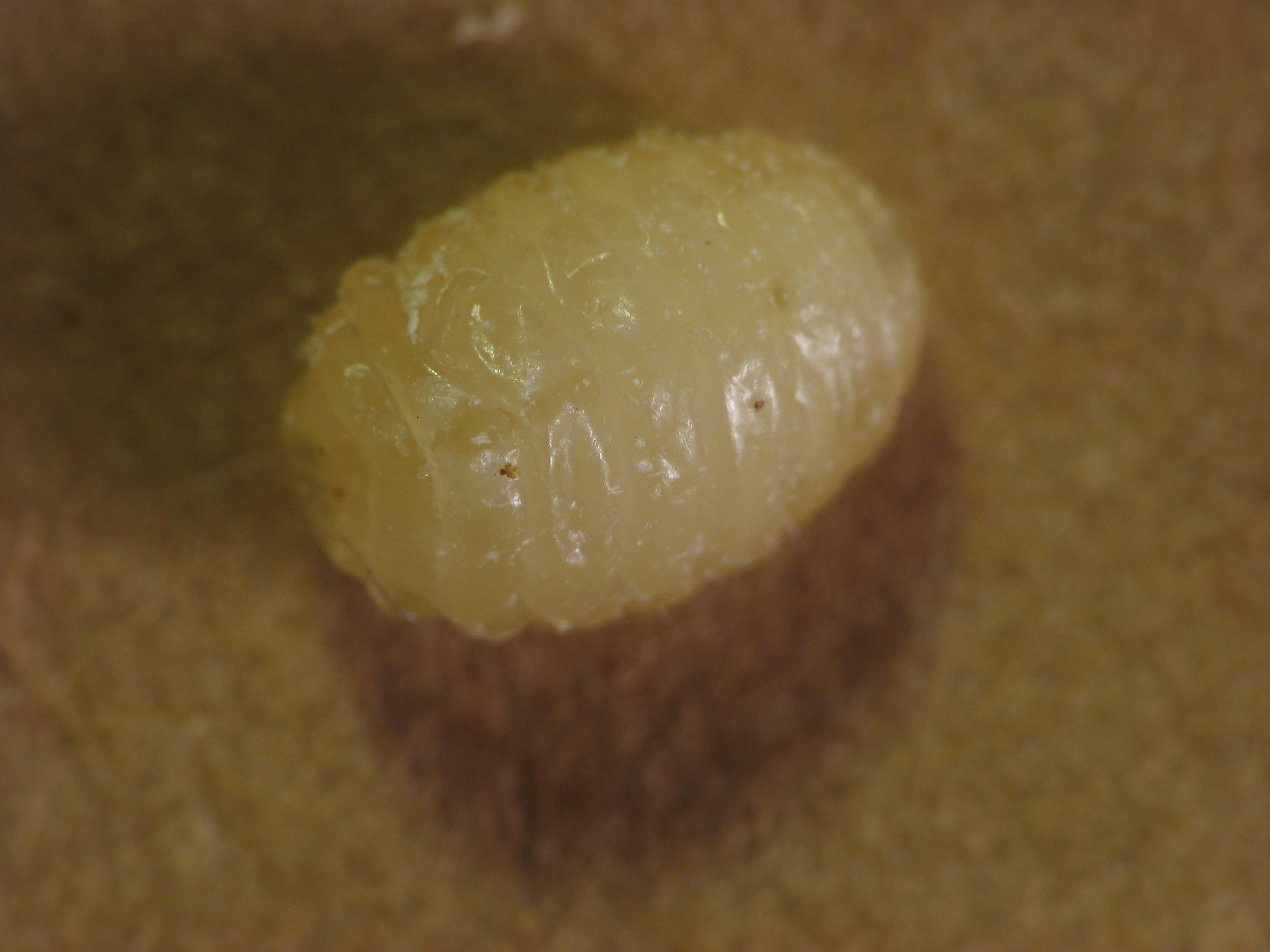
Eurosta solidaginis larva

Eurosta is a genus of gall maker flies in the family Tephritidae (known as fruit flies in North America and picture wing flies in Europe). There are seven species in the genus, all in North America.

== Species ==
- E. comma (Wiedemann, 1830)
- E. cribrata (Wulp, 1867)
- E. fenestrata Snow, 1894
- E. floridensis Foote, 1977
- E. lateralis (Wiedemann, 1830)
- E. latifrons (Loew, 1862)
- E. solidaginis (Fitch, 1855)
