= Microrhopala rileyi =

Scientific classification
- Kingdom: Animalia
- Phylum: Arthropoda
- Class: Insecta
- Order: Coleoptera
- Suborder: Polyphaga
- Infraorder: Cucujiformia
- Family: Chrysomelidae
- Genus: Microrhopala
- Species: M. rileyi

Binomial name
- Microrhopala rileyi S. Clark, 1983

Species of beetle

Microrhopala rileyi is a species of beetle of the family Chrysomelidae. It is found in the United States (Arkansas, Illinois, Kentucky, Missouri, Oklahoma).

== Description ==
Adults reach a length of about 4.1-5.5 mm (males) and 5.2-5.8 mm (females). Adults are black, often with a metallic blue sheen and with orange vittae on the elytron.

== Biology ==
They have been recorded feeding on Helianthus species.
