= Microrhopala erebus =

Scientific classification
- Kingdom: Animalia
- Phylum: Arthropoda
- Class: Insecta
- Order: Coleoptera
- Suborder: Polyphaga
- Infraorder: Cucujiformia
- Family: Chrysomelidae
- Genus: Microrhopala
- Species: M. erebus

Binomial name
- Microrhopala erebus (Newman, 1840)

Synonyms
- Hispa erebus Newman, 1841

Species of beetle

Microrhopala erebus is a species of beetle of the family Chrysomelidae. It is found in the United States (Florida, North Carolina, South Carolina), Belize and Mexico (Jalisco).

== Description ==
Adults reach a length of about 4.3–5.2 mm (males) and 4.5–5.4 mm (females). Adults are black.

== Biology ==
They have been recorded feeding on Solidago species. Furthermore, adults have been collected on Quercus species.
