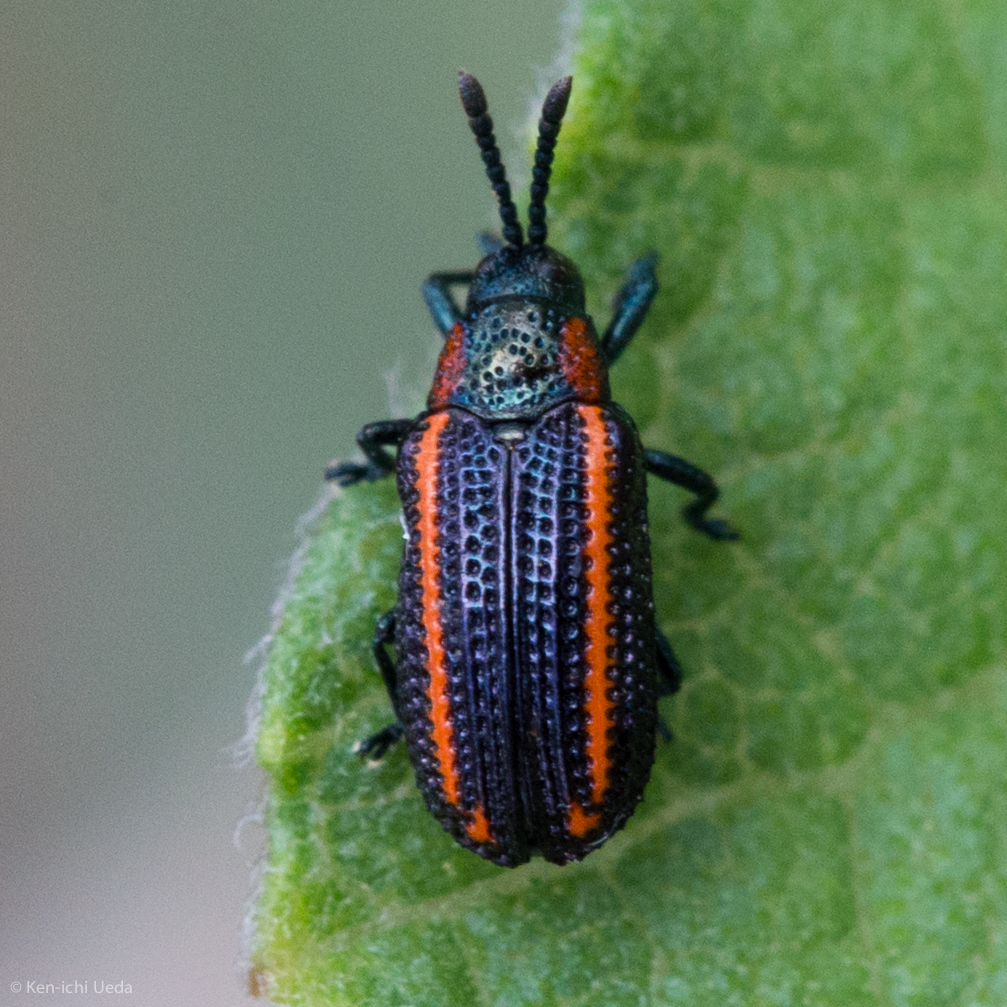

Scientific classification
- Kingdom: Animalia
- Phylum: Arthropoda
- Class: Insecta
- Order: Coleoptera
- Suborder: Polyphaga
- Infraorder: Cucujiformia
- Family: Chrysomelidae
- Genus: Microrhopala
- Species: M. rubrolineata

Binomial name
- Microrhopala rubrolineata (Mannerheim, 1843)

Synonyms
- Odontota rubrolineata Mannerheim 1843; Microrhopala rubrolineata militaris Van Dyke, 1925; Microrhopala signaticollis LeConte, 1859; Microrhopala vulnerata Horn, 1883

= Microrhopala rubrolineata =

Species of beetle

Microrhopala rubrolineata is a species of leaf beetle in the family Chrysomelidae. It is found in Central America and North America, where it has been recorded from the United States (Arizona, California, New Mexico, Texas) and Mexico (Baja California, Sonora, Durango).

== Description ==
Adults reach a length of about 3.7-5.3 mm. Adults are black, often with a metallic blue or purple sheen and often with orange markings on the pronotum and/or elytron.

== Biology ==
Like other Microrhopala species, they prefer plants with composite flowers, especially the goldenrods and daisy-sunflower types.

== Subspecies ==
These four subspecies belong to the species Microrhopala rubrolineata:

- Microrhopala rubrolineata militaris Van Dyke, 1925 (California to Texas)
- Microrhopala rubrolineata rubrolineata (southern California and Arizona to Sonora and Durango)
- Microrhopala rubrolineata signaticollis J. L. LeConte, 1859 (California to Baja California)
- Microrhopala rubrolineata vulnerata Horn, 1883 (Arizona to New Mexico)
