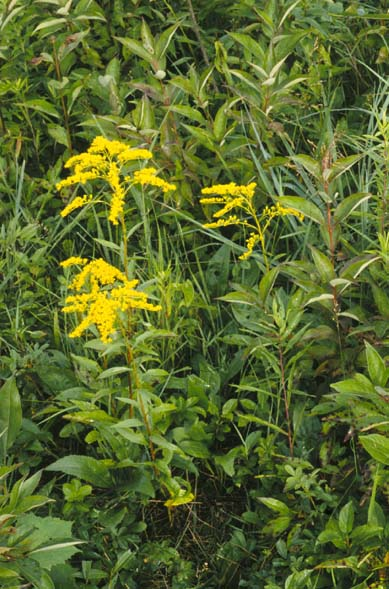

Conservation status
- Secure (NatureServe)

Scientific classification
- Kingdom: Plantae
- Clade: Tracheophytes
- Clade: Angiosperms
- Clade: Eudicots
- Clade: Asterids
- Order: Asterales
- Family: Asteraceae
- Genus: Solidago
- Species: S. juncea

Binomial name
- Solidago juncea Aiton 1789

Synonyms
- Aster ciliaris Kuntze

= Solidago juncea =

Species of flowering plant

Solidago juncea, the early goldenrod, plume golden-rod, or yellow top, is a North American species of herbaceous perennial plants of the family Asteraceae native to eastern and central Canada and eastern and central United States. It grows from Nova Scotia west to Manitoba and Minnesota south as far as northern Georgia and northern Arkansas, with a few isolated populations in Louisiana and Oklahoma.

Solidago juncea is a perennial herb up to 120 cm (4 feet) tall, spreading by means of underground rhizomes. Leaves around the base of the plant can be as much as 30 cm (1 foot) long, the leaves getting smaller higher on the stem. One plant can produce as many as 450 small yellow flower heads in a large, showy array.

Solidago juncea is often grown in gardens as an ornamental.

== Galls ==
This species is host to the following insect induced galls:

- Asphondylia monacha Osten Sacken, 1869 (summer generation)
- Asphondylia s-odora-bud-rosette
- Asteromyia carbonifera (Osten Sacken, 1862)
- Epiblema scudderiana (Clemens, 1860)
- Eurosta comma (Wiedemann, 1830)
- Eurosta cribrata (Wulp, 1867)
- Gnorimoschema gallaesolidaginis (Fitch, 1855)
- Gnorimoschema salinaris Busck, 1911
- Rhopalomyia bulbula Felt, 1908
- Rhopalomyia gina Dorchin
- Rhopalomyia hirtipes (Osten Sacken, 1862)
- Calycomyza solidaginis Kaltenbach, 1869

external link to gallformers
