= Microrhopala inermis =

Scientific classification
- Kingdom: Animalia
- Phylum: Arthropoda
- Class: Insecta
- Order: Coleoptera
- Suborder: Polyphaga
- Infraorder: Cucujiformia
- Family: Chrysomelidae
- Genus: Microrhopala
- Species: M. inermis

Binomial name
- Microrhopala inermis Staines, 2006

Species of beetle

Microrhopala inermis is a species of beetle of the family Chrysomelidae. It is found in Canada (British Columbia) and the United States (Montana, Oregon).

== Biology ==
The foodplant is unknown, but adults have been collected from Aster and Balsamorhiza species (including Balsamorhiza sagittata).
