= Microrhopala pulchella =

Scientific classification
- Kingdom: Animalia
- Phylum: Arthropoda
- Class: Insecta
- Order: Coleoptera
- Suborder: Polyphaga
- Infraorder: Cucujiformia
- Family: Chrysomelidae
- Genus: Microrhopala
- Species: M. pulchella

Binomial name
- Microrhopala pulchella Baly, 1864

Species of beetle

Microrhopala pulchella is a species of beetle of the family Chrysomelidae. It is found in Costa Rica, El Salvador, Honduras, Mexico (Guerrero, Jalisco, Morelos, Quintana Roo, Tabasco, Veracruz) and Nicaragua.

== Biology ==
The foodplant is unknown, but adults have been collected on Gossypium species and Parthenium hysterophorus.
