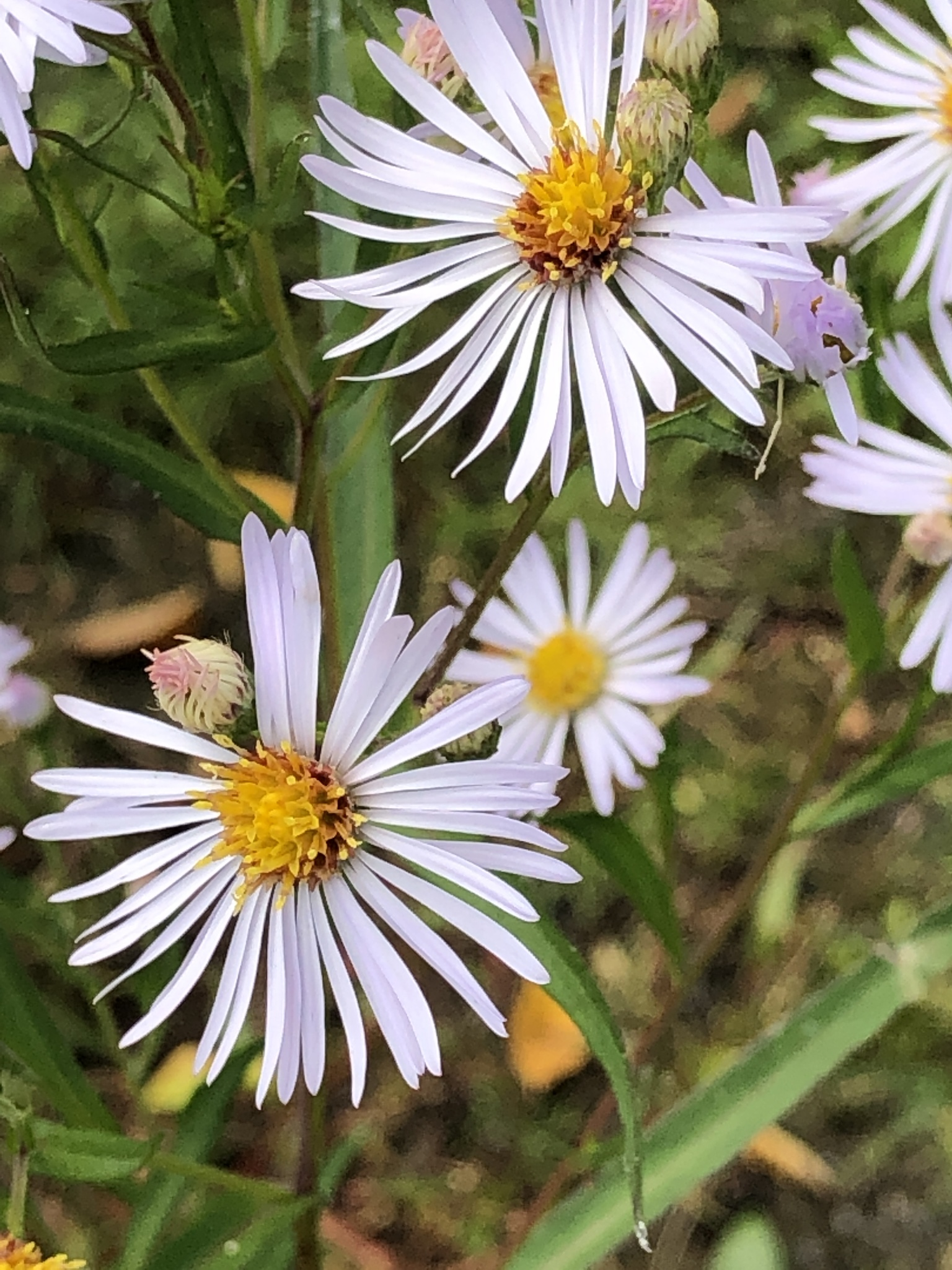

Conservation status
- Secure (NatureServe)

Scientific classification
- Kingdom: Plantae
- Clade: Tracheophytes
- Clade: Angiosperms
- Clade: Eudicots
- Clade: Asterids
- Order: Asterales
- Family: Asteraceae
- Genus: Symphyotrichum
- Subgenus: Symphyotrichum subg. Symphyotrichum
- Section: Symphyotrichum sect. Symphyotrichum
- Species: S. lanceolatum

Binomial name
- Symphyotrichum lanceolatum (Willd.) G.L.Nesom

Subspecies and varieties
- List: S. lanceolatum subsp. lanceolatum; S. lanceolatum var. hesperium (A.Gray) G.L.Nesom; S. lanceolatum var. hirsuticaule (Semple & Chmiel.) G.L.Nesom; S. lanceolatum var. interior (Wiegand) G.L.Nesom; S. lanceolatum var. latifolium (Semple & Chmiel.) G.L.Nesom
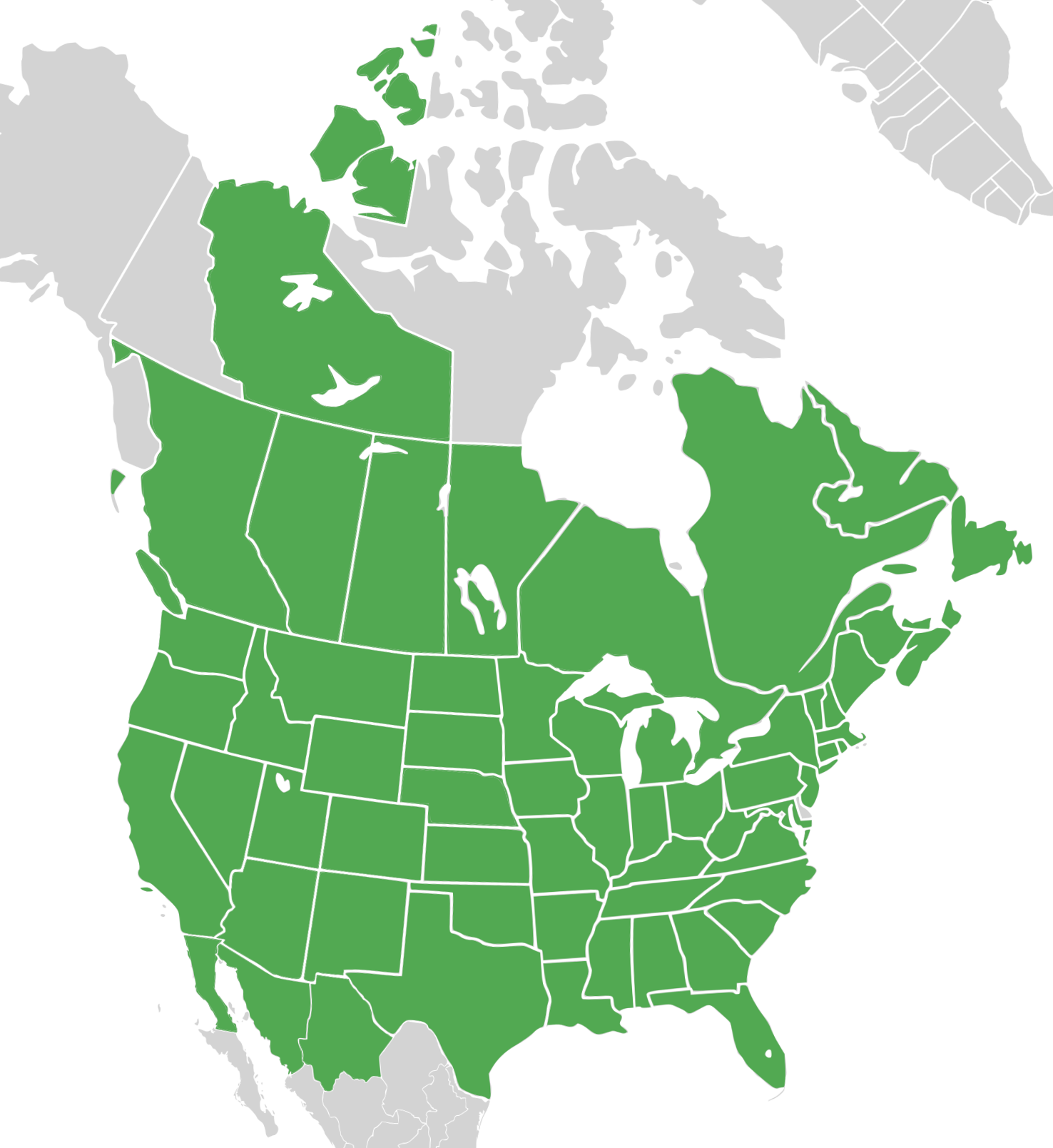
- Native distribution of Symphyotrichum lanceolatum by state, province, and territory. For infraspecies distributions, see text.

Synonyms
- Basionym: Aster lanceolatus Willd.; Infraspecies: subsp. lanceolatum; Aster abbreviatus Nees; Aster bellidiflorus Willd.; Aster bellidiflorus var. rubricaulis DC.; Aster cornuti J.C.Wendl. ex Nees; Aster cornuti Mill. ex Nees; Aster eminens Lindl.; Aster lamarckianus Nees; Aster lanceolatus var. monocephalus Kuntze; Aster lanceolatus var. simplex (Willd.) A.G.Jones; Aster lanceolatus subsp. simplex (Willd.) A.G.Jones; Aster laxifolius var. laetiflorus Torr. & A.Gray; Aster laxus Willd.; Aster pallens Willd.; Aster paniculatus var. acutidens E.S.Burgess; Aster paniculatus var. bellidiflorus E.S.Burgess; Aster paniculatus var. cinerascens Fernald; Aster paniculatus var. lanatus Fernald; Aster paniculatus var. polychrous Lunell; Aster paniculatus var. simplex E.S.Burgess; Aster simplex Willd.; Aster simplex var. estuarinus B.Boivin; Aster simplex var. ramosissimus (Torr. & A.Gray) Cronquist; Aster stenophyllus Lindl.; Aster tenuifolius var. bellidiflorus (Willd.) Torr. & A.Gray; Aster tenuifolius var. ramosissimus Torr. & A.Gray; Symphyotrichum simplex (Willd.) Á.Löve & D.Löve; var. hesperium; Aster coerulescens var. laetevirens (Greene) Cronquist; Aster coerulescens var. wootonii Wiegand; Aster durus Lunell; Aster fluvialis Osterh.; Aster foliaceus var. hesperius (A.Gray) Jeps.; Aster hesperius A.Gray; Aster hesperius var. laetevirens (Greene) Cronquist; Aster hesperius var. wootonii Greene; Aster laetevirens Greene; Aster lanceolatus subsp. hesperius (A.Gray) Semple & Chmiel.; Aster lautus Lunell; Aster lautus var. prionoides Lunell; Aster osterhoutii Rydb.; Aster wootonii Greene; Symphyotrichum hesperium (A.Gray) Á.Löve & D.Löve; Symphyotrichum lanceolatum subsp. hesperium (A.Gray) G.L.Nesom; var. hirsuticaule; Aster lanceolatus var. hirsuticaulis Semple & Chmiel.; var. interior; Aster interior Wiegand; Aster lanceolatus var. interior (Wiegand) Semple & Chmiel.; Aster lanceolatus var. interior (Wiegand) A.G.Jones; Aster lanceolatus subsp. interior (Wiegand) A.G.Jones; Aster simplex var. interior (Wiegand) Cronquist; var. latifolium; Aster lanceolatus var. latifolius Semple & Chmiel.

= Symphyotrichum lanceolatum =

Species of plant in the aster family

Symphyotrichum lanceolatum (formerly Aster lanceolatus and Aster simplex) is a species of flowering plant in the family Asteraceae native to North America. Common names include panicled aster, lance-leaved aster, and white panicled aster. It is a perennial, herbaceous plant that may reach 1.5 meters (5 feet) tall or more, sometimes approaching 2 m (6 1/2 ft). The lance-shaped leaves are generally hairless but may feel slightly rough to the touch on the top because of tiny bristles. S. lanceolatum blooms July to October. The flowers grow in clusters and branch in panicles. They have 16–50 white ray florets that are up to 14 millimeters (1/2 inch) long and sometimes tinged pink or purple. The flower centers consist of disk florets that begin as yellow and become purple as they mature.

The species occurs in a wide variety of mostly moist and open habitats, including riparian areas (areas between land and a river or stream), meadows, and ditches. Panicled aster has a stout rhizome and can spread to form a clonal colony as well as reproduce by wind-blown seed. Because of its rhizomatic spreading and its production of chemicals that can be detrimental to other plants around it, the species can do damage to ecosystems outside of its native range, as it has in Europe where it has been introduced.

Symphyotrichum lanceolatum is currently divided into subspecies and varieties which have minor differences in appearance and vary in chromosome counts as well as distribution, with some overlap. It is a conservationally secure species whose late-summer and fall appearing flowers play an important role for late-season pollinators and nectar-seeking insects such as bumblebees, wasps, and hoverflies. In addition to being used by indigenous peoples of the Americas for medicinal purposes, it has been cultivated as an ornamental garden plant and used in the cut flower industry.

== Description ==
Panicled aster grows from a rhizome and has a thick, erect stem that can reach 1.5 meters (5 feet) tall or more, sometimes approaching 2 m (6 1/2 ft). The leaves are generally hairless but may feel slightly rough to the touch on the top because of tiny bristles. The leaf blades have winged petioles and may sheath the stem at their bases. The largest leaves, near the base of the plant, are up to about 15 centimeters (6 inches) long. Those higher on the stem are smaller, and the lower leaves may have toothed edges.

Symphyotrichum lanceolatum blooms July to October. The inflorescence is usually a large, branching panicled array of many flower heads of varying size. Each flower head has many tiny florets put together into what appear as one. There are 16 to 50 ray florets per head, each measuring 3–14 millimeters (1/8–1/2 inch) long, in white, sometimes tinged pink or purple. The roughly 20–40 disk florets bloom yellow and turn purple. Each has five lobes that may spread when open.

=== Chromosomes ===
Symphyotrichum lanceolatum has a base number of x = 8. Tetraploid, pentaploid, hexaploid, septaploid, and octaploid cytotypes with respective chromosome counts of 32, 40, 48, 56, and 64 have been reported, depending on the infraspecies, as follows:

- Symphyotrichum lanceolatum var. hesperium: 2n = 8x = 64.
- Symphyotrichum lanceolatum var. hirsuticaule: 2n = 4x = 32.
- Symphyotrichum lanceolatum var. interior: 2n = 6x = 48 and 2n = 8x = 64.
- Symphyotrichum lanceolatum var. lanceolatum: 2n = 4x = 32, 2n = 5x = 40, 2n = 6x = 48, 2n = 7x = 56, and 2n = 8x = 64.
- Symphyotrichum lanceolatum var. latifolium: 2n = 8x = 64.

== Taxonomy ==
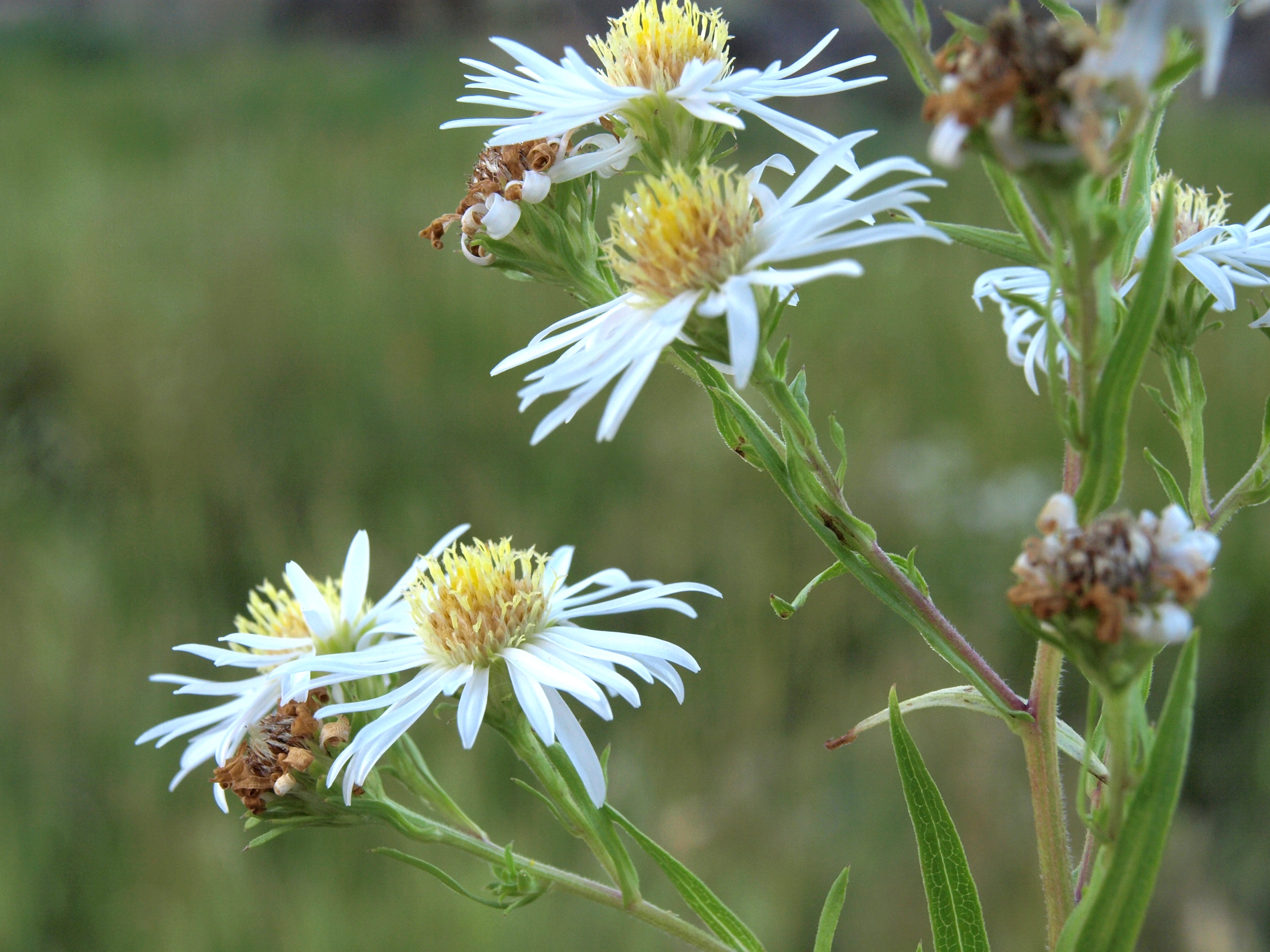
S. lanceolatum var. hesperium White Mountains, Nevada

Symphyotrichum lanceolatum was formerly included in the large genus Aster as Aster lanceolatus. However, this broad circumscription of Aster is polyphyletic and the North American asters are now mostly classified in Symphyotrichum and several other genera. It is classified in the subgenus Symphyotrichum, section Symphyotrichum, subsection Dumosi, one of the "bushy asters and relatives".

=== Infraspecies ===
This species may be divided into two subspecies and five varieties, shown here. NatureServe follows this circumscription.

- Symphyotrichum lanceolatum subsp. hesperium
  - Symphyotrichum lanceolatum var. hesperium
- Symphyotrichum lanceolatum subsp. lanceolatum
  - Symphyotrichum lanceolatum var. hirsuticaule
  - Symphyotrichum lanceolatum var. interior
  - Symphyotrichum lanceolatum var. lanceolatum
  - Symphyotrichum lanceolatum var. latifolium

In the case of the subspecies autonyms, sometimes one or the other will be ignored or treated as taxonomic synonyms, as in the case of Plants of the World Online (POWO), for example, shown here:

- Symphyotrichum lanceolatum subsp. lanceolatum
- Symphyotrichum lanceolatum var. hesperium
- Symphyotrichum lanceolatum var. hirsuticaule
- Symphyotrichum lanceolatum var. interior
- Symphyotrichum lanceolatum var. latifolium

=== Hybrids ===
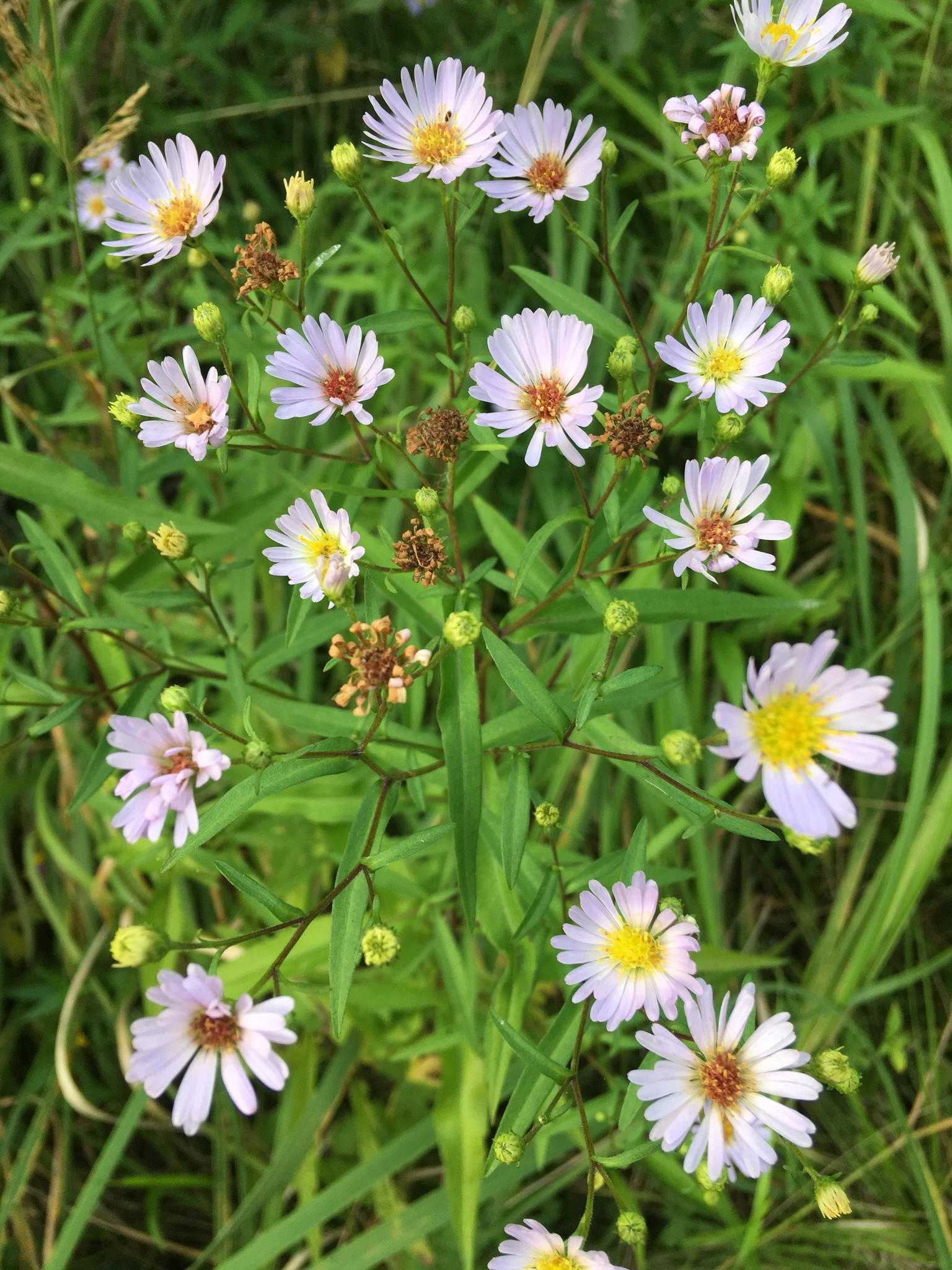
Symphyotrichum × salignum growing in Lobnya, Moscow Oblast, Russia

The hybrid of S. lanceolatum var. lanceolatum with S. novi-belgii var. novi-begii, known as Sympyotrichum × salignum, originated in cultivation and is now naturalized in Europe. Hybrids also have been reported with S. boreale, S. laeve, S. lateriflorum, S. puniceum and S. racemosum.

=== Etymology ===
Symphyotrichum lanceolatum is commonly known as panicled aster, white panicled aster, and lance-leaved aster. Other common names include tall white aster, eastern line aster, lance-leaf aster, and white-panicle aster.

Along with other asters that bloom in the fall, Symphyotrichum lanceolatum may be called a Michaelmas daisy. Narrow-leaf Michaelmas daisy is also one of its common names. S. lanceolatum var. interior may be called interior white aster, and S. lanceolatum var. latifolium may be called broadleaf panicled aster. S. lanceolatum var. hesperium common names include western line aster, western willow aster, Wooten's aster, and Siskiyou aster. Another species in the family Asteraceae, Eucephalus glabratus, is also commonly known as Siskiyou aster.

Aster comes from the Ancient Greek word ἀστήρ (astḗr), meaning "star", referring to the shape of the flower. The word "aster" was used to describe a star-like flower as early as 1542 in German physician and botanist Leonhart Fuchs' book De historia stirpium commentarii insignes, Latin for Notable Commentaries on the History of Plants. An old common name for Astereae species using the suffix "-wort" is starwort, also spelled star-wort or star wort. An early use of this name can be found in the same work by Fuchs as Sternkraut, translated from German literally as "star herb" (Stern Kraut).

The specific epithet (second part of the binomial name) lanceolatum is a Latin adjective meaning "lance-shaped". The genus name Symphyotrichum is a combining of Ancient Greek words meaning "junction of hair".

== Distribution and habitat ==
=== Native ===
Symphyotrichum lanceolatum is native to much of Canada, the United States, and northwestern Mexico. In its native range, it occurs in a wide variety of mostly moist and open habitats, including riparian areas, meadows, and ditches. Distribution and habitat vary among the infraspecies.

S. lanceolatum var. lanceolatum is widespread in central and northeastern North America. It is absent in the west and southeast. It grows at 0–900 meters (0–2,950 feet) in stream banks, thicket borders, meadows, fields, and ditches.

S. lanceolatum var. hesperium is a widespread western species native to North America in the Northwest Territories, from British Columbia to Quebec; nearly all the contiguous United States west of the Mississippi River, plus Wisconsin; as well as the Mexican states of Baja California, Sonora and Chihuahua. It grows at 10–2,700 m (30–8,860 ft) on the edges of streams in prairies, wet meadows, open slopes of mountainous pine forests, roadside ditches, and can live in calcareous soil.

S. lanceolatum var. hirsuticaule is native to the northwestern Great Lakes region as well as southeast Manitoba in "mucky soils on glacial deposits", and it can be found at 100–300 m (330–980 ft).

S. lanceolatum var. interior is native to streams in lowlands at 10–400 m (30–1,310 ft) in most of the Great Lakes region of North America as well as the central United States.

S. lanceolatum var. latifolium is a very widespread central and eastern species where grows in thickets, deciduous woods borders, stream banks, and ditches at 0–800 m (0–2,620 ft). It is the only variety native to the southeastern United States.

Native distribution of varieties
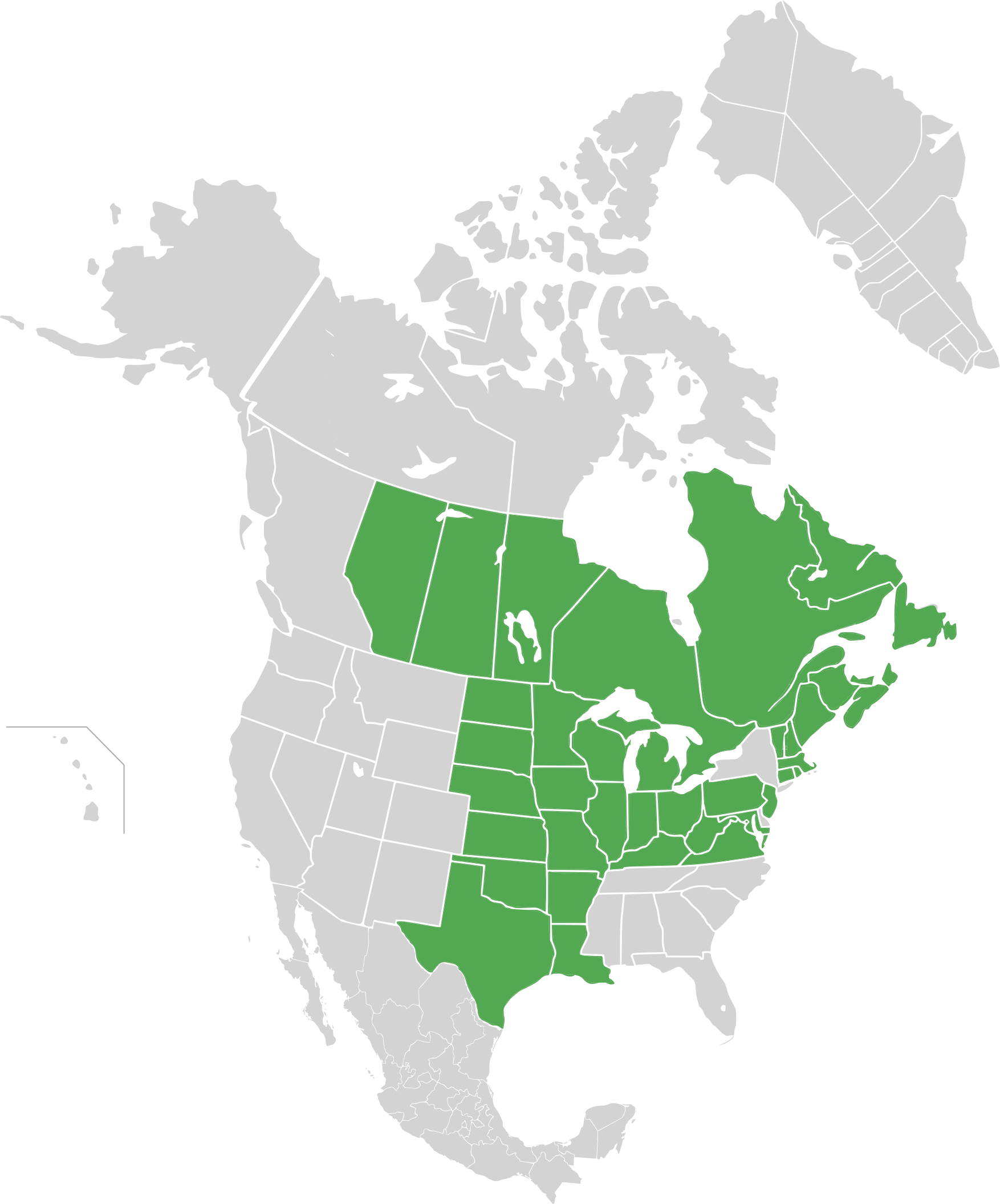
S. l. var. lanceolatum

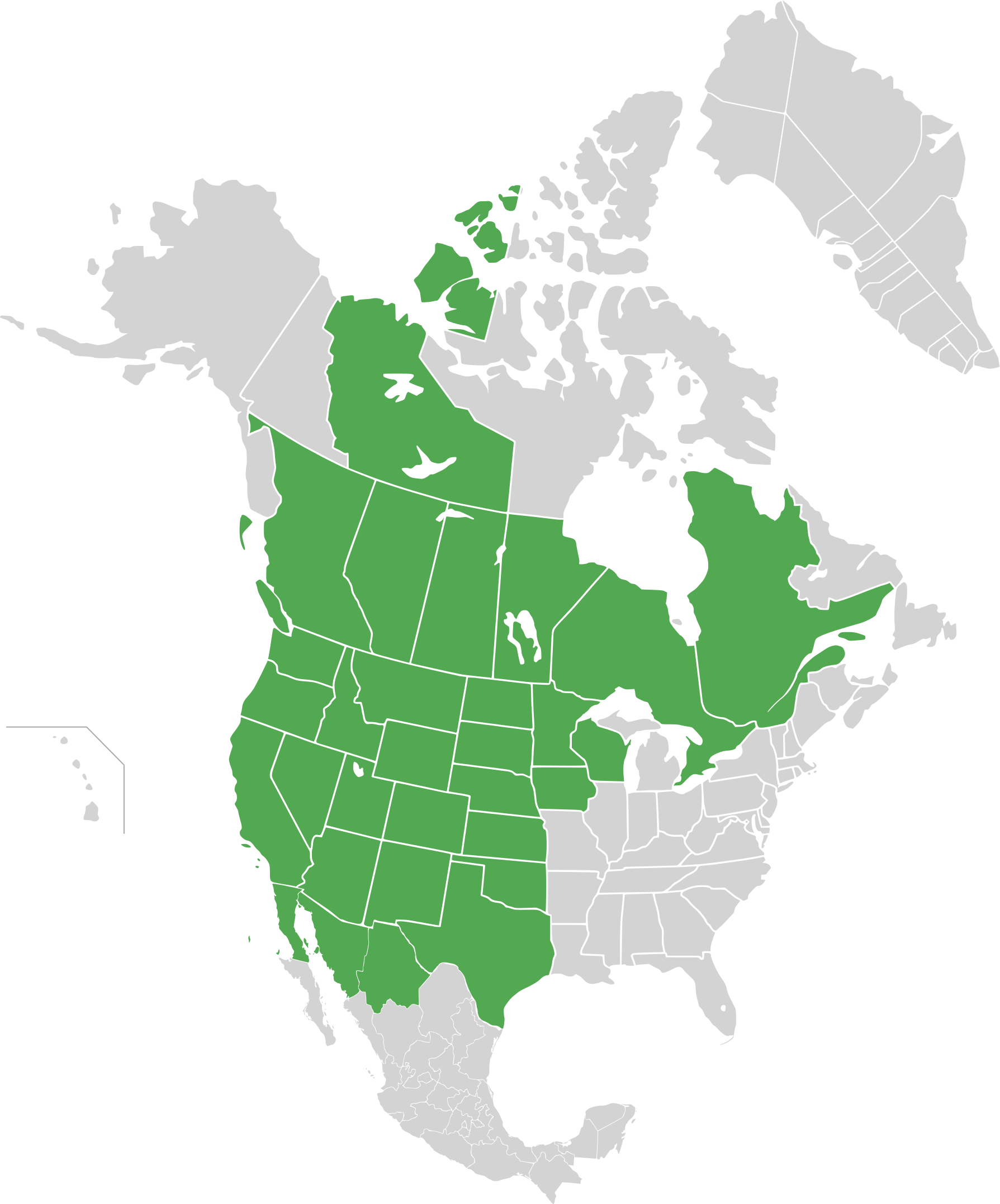
S. l. var. hesperium

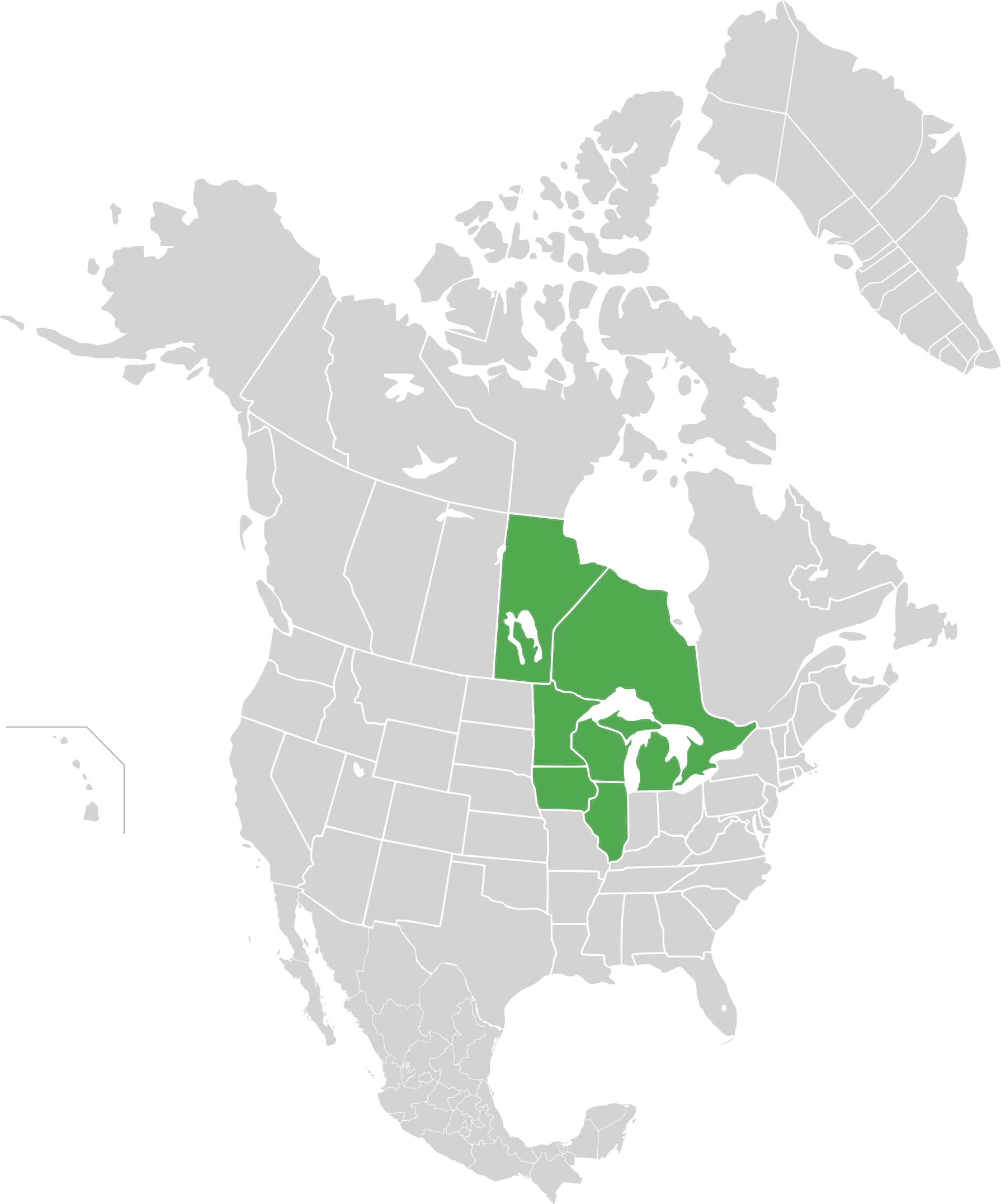
S. l. var. hirsuticaule

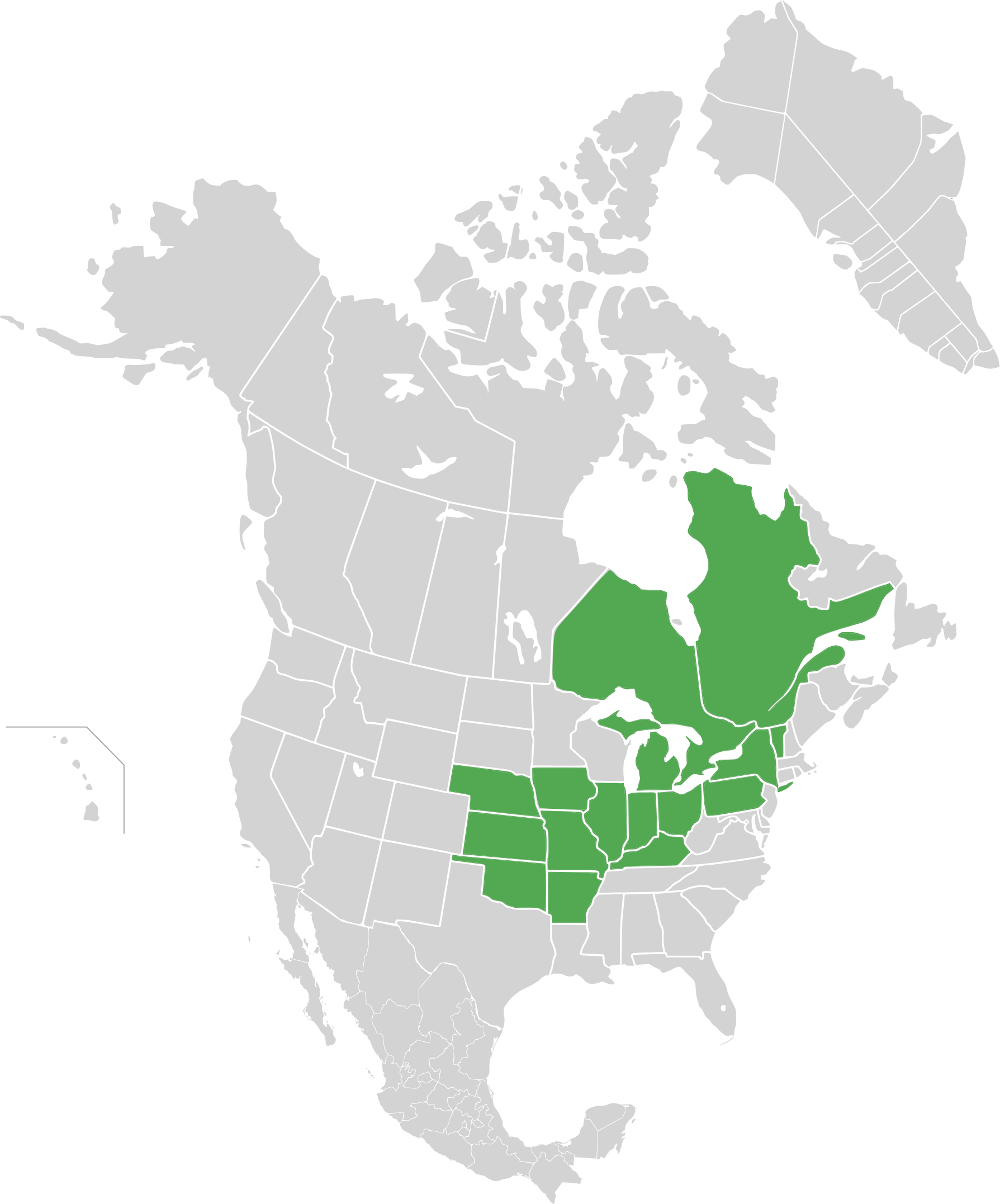
S. l. var. interior

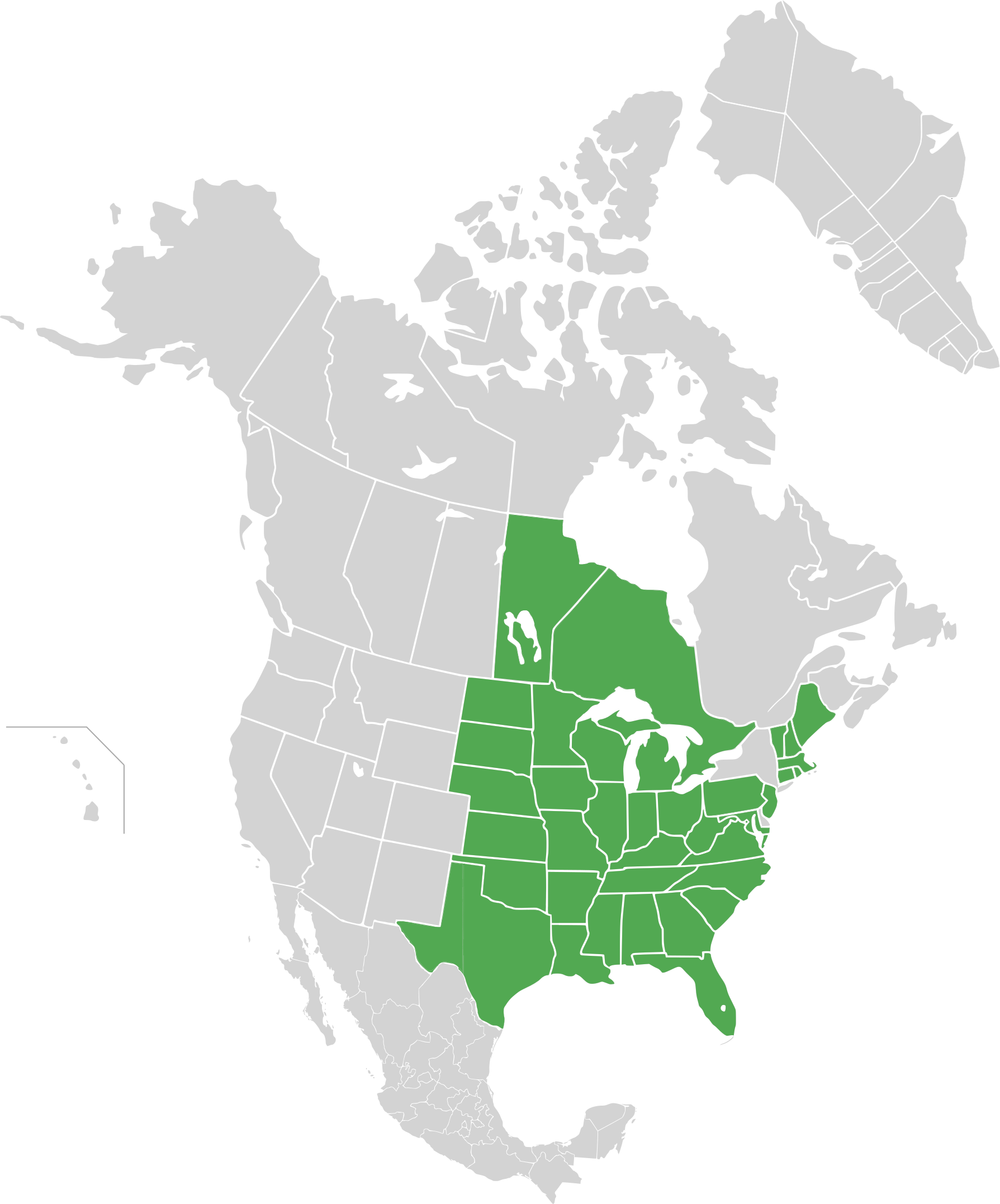
S. l. var. latifolium

=== Introduced ===
Symphyotrichum lanceolatum has been introduced and naturalized in many parts of Europe, from Belgium to Serbia to Latvia, where it occurs in disturbed man-made habitats and riparian areas as an invasive species. As of 2020, it was not on the European Union's List of invasive alien species of Union concern.

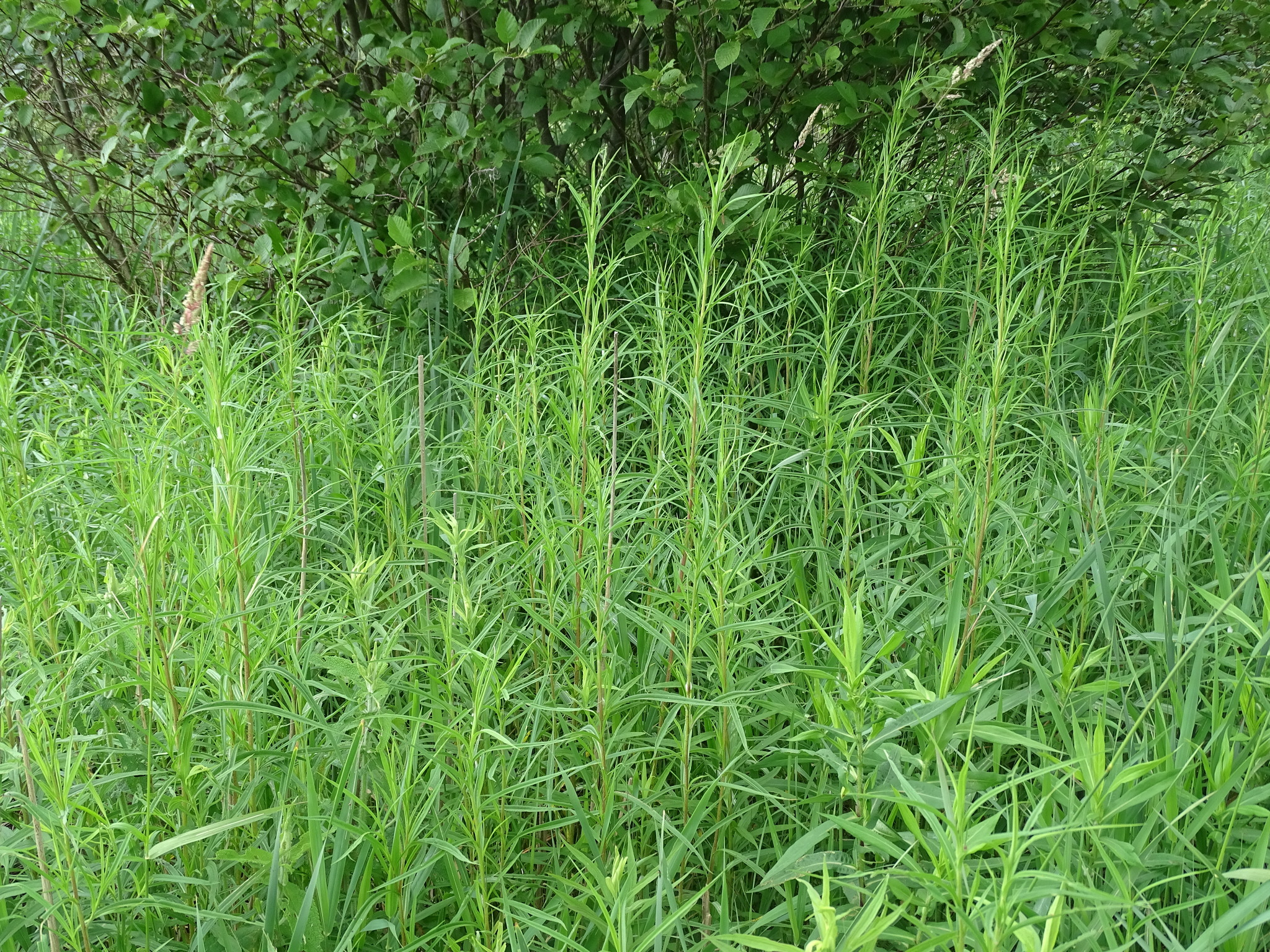
Large clone of S. lanceolatum prior to flowering, Ontario, Canada

== Ecology ==
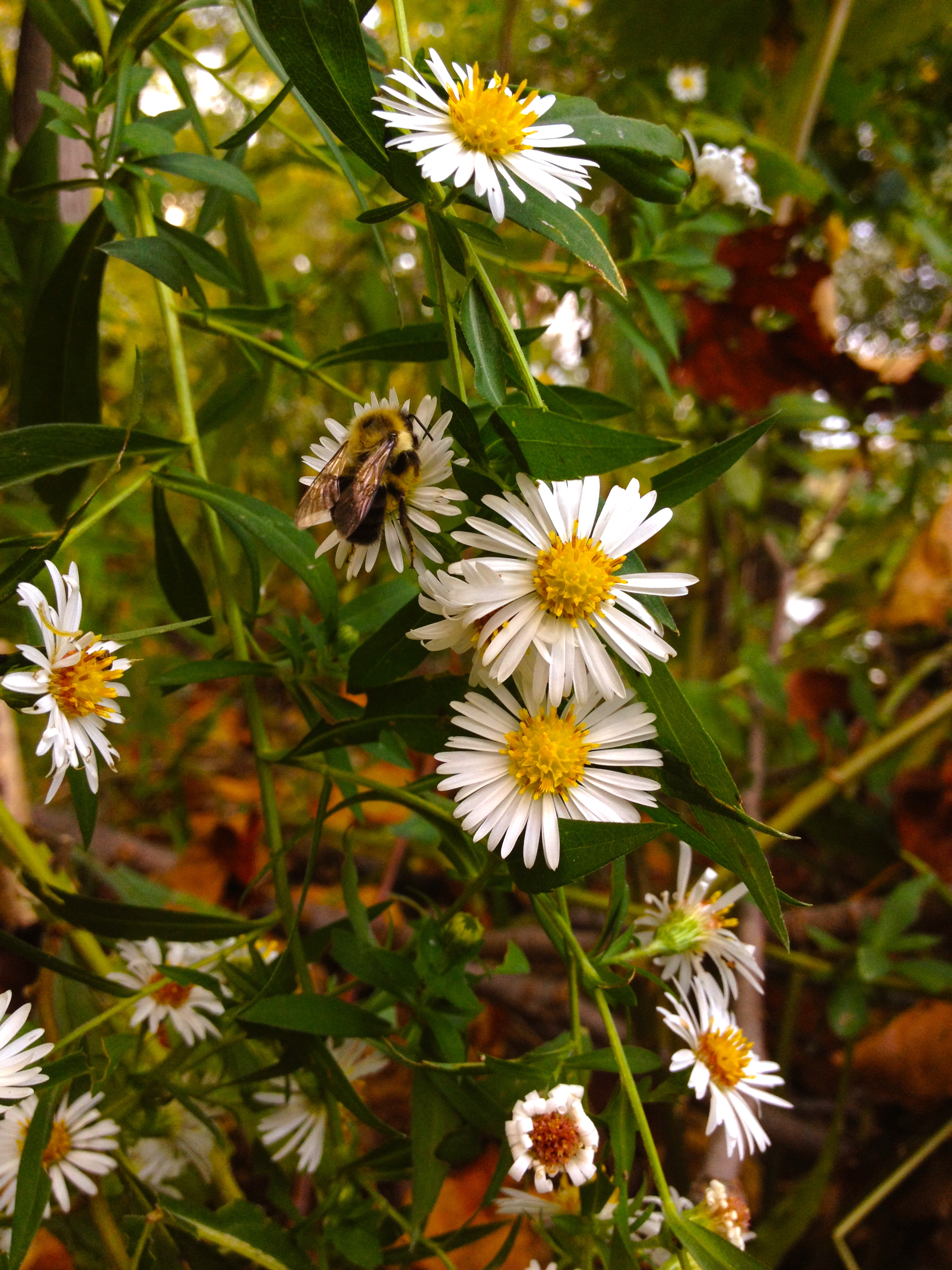
Bumblebee on S. lanceolatum, Fairfax County, Virginia

In its native range, Symphyotrichum lanceolatum may be a minor weed in agricultural fields. In addition to dispersal by wind-blown seed, it spreads extensively by rhizomes to create large clonal colonies. Although these clones do not dominate habitats in North America, growing in association with grasses, goldenrods, and other asters, in Europe it is an invasive species that excludes native plants in riparian habitats. This invasiveness has been linked to allelopathic compounds in S. lanceolatum tissue and their effects on native European plants. Viable seed production in Europe seems to be limited, and the species largely spreads there via rhizomes.

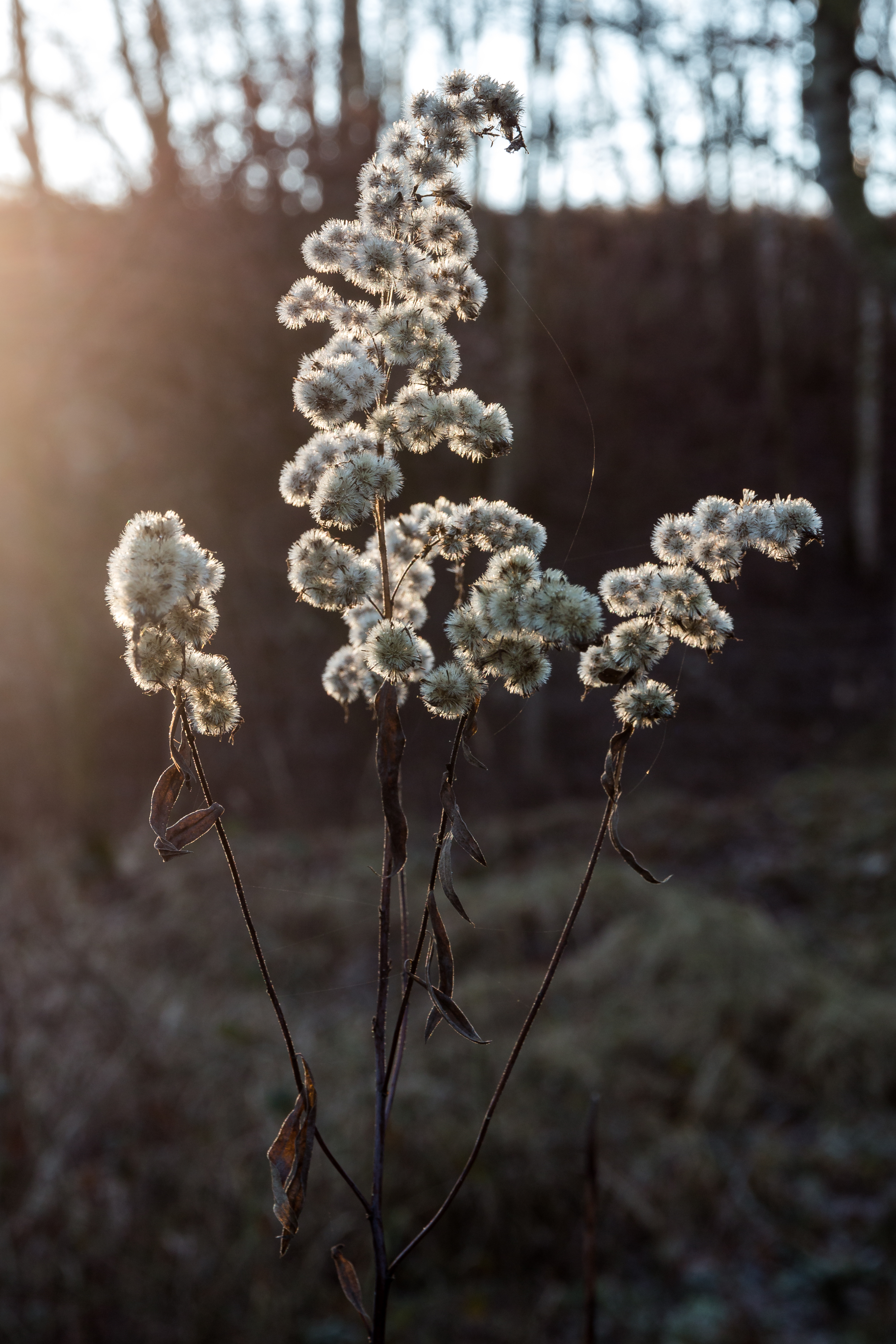
Fruiting S. lanceolatum, Germany

The species is visited by a wide variety of late-season pollinating and nectar-seeking insects, including bees, hoverflies, flies, moths, and wasps. Cross-fertilization is usually required to produce viable seed, and as such, large clones may have low seed production.

=== Pests and diseases ===
Several midge species are known to form galls on Symphyotrichum lanceolatum where their larvae can develop, including Rhopalomyia asteriflorae in the flowers or buds resulting in their stunted growth, and Rhopalomyia strobiligemma.

The leaf-blister gall midge Asteromyia paniculata and the fungus Schlerotium asteris have a symbiotic relationship on the leaves in that the fungus gains additional nutrition from the larva and, in turn, gives some shelter to the midge.

Leaf-mining insects known to feed on this species include Sumitrosis inaequalis, Ophiomyia curvipalpis, Phytomyza albiceps, and Microrhopala xerene. Younger instars of gorgone checkerspot caterpillars (Chlosyne gorgone) will feed on S. lanceolatum.

== Conservation ==
NatureServe lists the species Symphyotrichum lanceolatum as a whole as Secure (G5) worldwide; Vulnerable (S3) in Iowa; and, Imperiled (S2) in North Carolina and Newfoundland. S. l. subsp. hesperium, S. l. subsp. lanceolatum, S. l. var. interior, and S. l. var. latifolium are all listed as a Secure Subspecies (T5) globally. NatureServe has no global ranking for S. l. var. hirsuticaule.

In individual states and provinces of the United States and Canada, S. lanceolatum subsp. hesperium is Vulnerable (S3) in Wyoming, and Critically Imperiled (S1) in Texas; S. l. var. interior is Possibly Extirpated (SH) in New York state and Quebec, and Critically Imperiled (S1) in New Jersey; and, S. l. var. latifolium is Vulnerable (S3) in Ontario and Georgia. S. l. var. hirsuticaule has no vulnerable or critical state or province rankings.

== Uses ==
=== Medicinal ===
Within its native range, Symphyotrichum lanceolatum has been used by indigenous peoples for a variety of medicinal purposes: S. l. var. hesperium by the Zuni people in the American Southwest for wounds and nosebleed, and S. l. var. lanceolatum by the Iroquois in what is now eastern Canada to treat fever.

=== Gardening ===
Symphyotrichum lanceolatum has been cultivated as an ornamental garden plant and used in the cut flower industry. Cultivar 'Edwin Beckett', developed before 1902, has pale violet-blue ray florets that make a flower head which is about 25 millimeters (1 inch) wide. As of July 2021, it was listed in the Royal Horticultural Society Plant Finder with availability at 3–4 nurseries.
