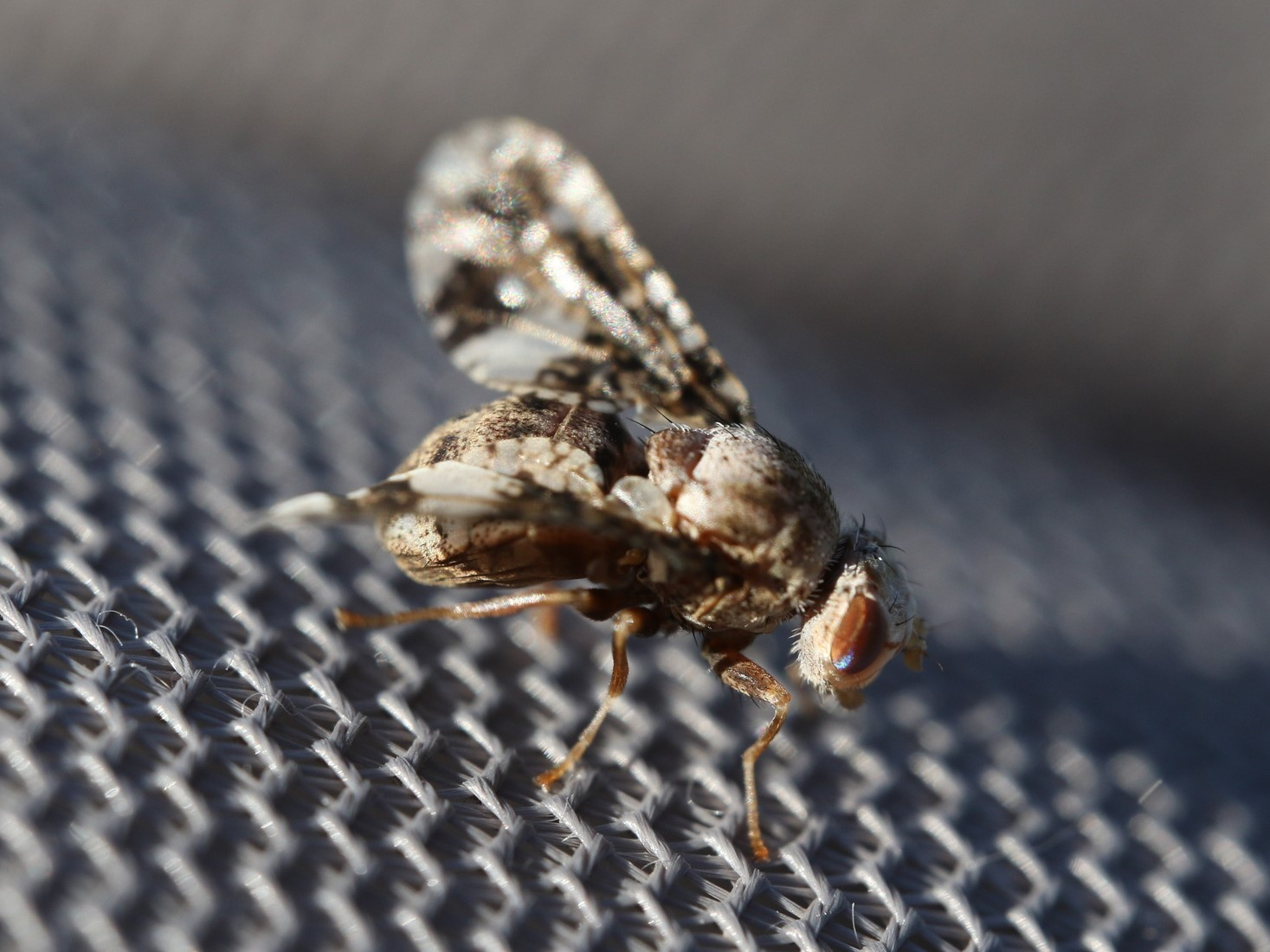

Scientific classification
- Kingdom: Animalia
- Phylum: Arthropoda
- Class: Insecta
- Order: Diptera
- Family: Tephritidae
- Subfamily: Tephritinae
- Tribe: Dithrycini
- Genus: Eurosta
- Species: E. cribrata

Binomial name
- Eurosta cribrata (Wulp, 1867)

Synonyms
- Eurosta conspurcata Doane, 1899; Eurosta reticulata Wulp, 1867; Trypeta cribrata Snow, 1894

= Eurosta cribrata =

Species of fly

Eurosta cribrata is a species of tephritid or fruit flies in the family Tephritidae.

== Distribution ==
Canada, United States.
