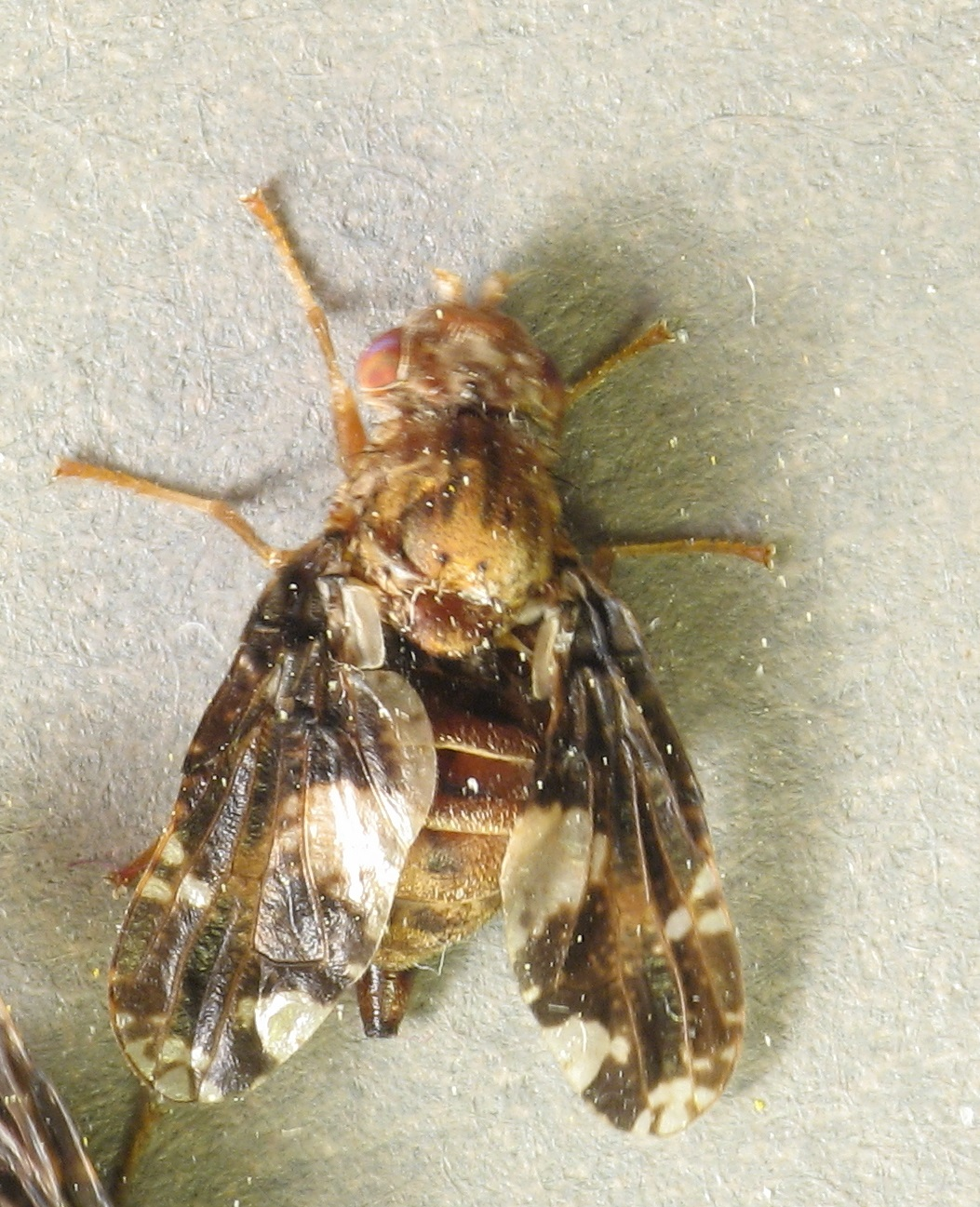
- E. solidaginis female
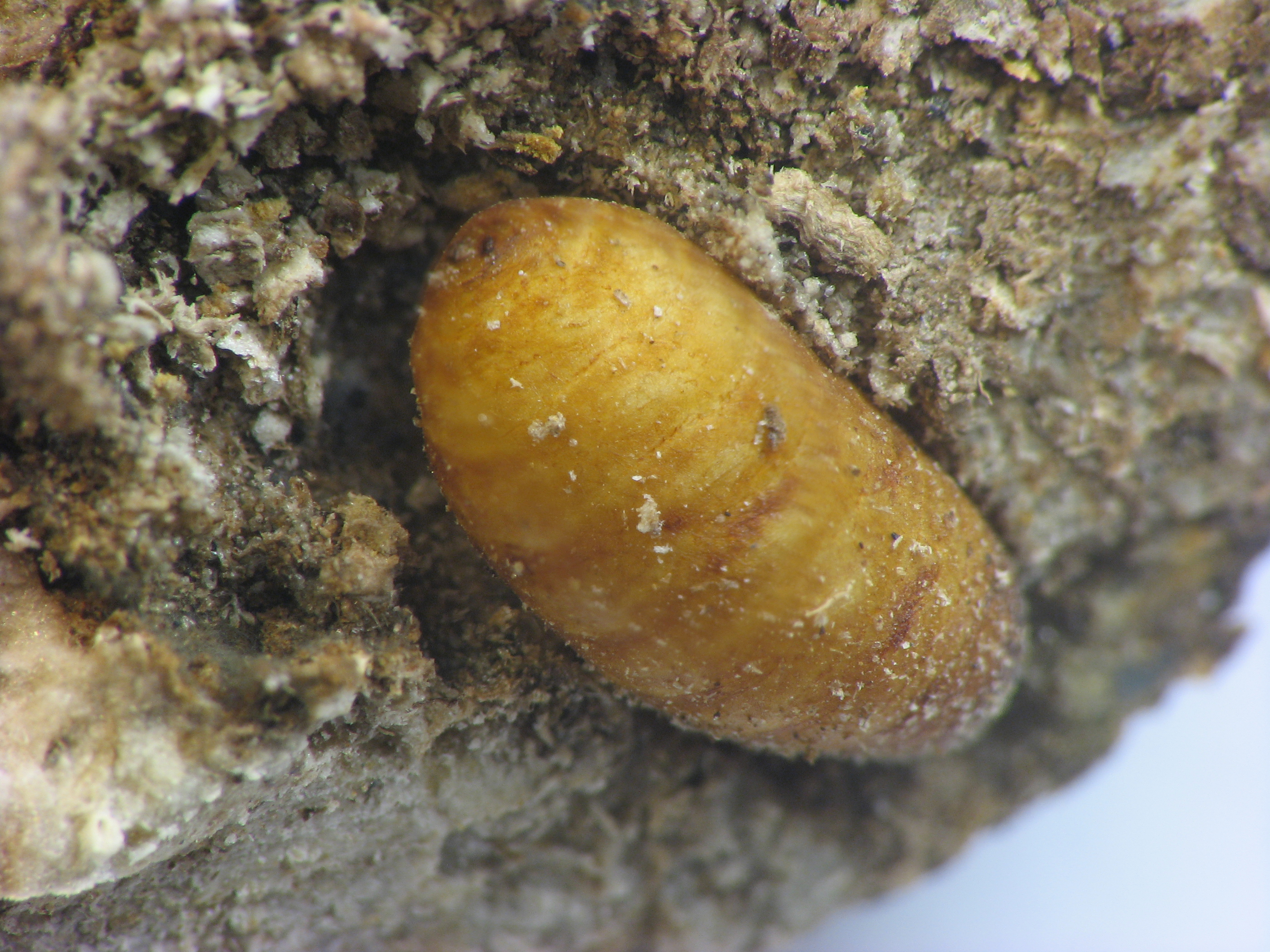
- E. solidaginis puparium

Scientific classification
- Kingdom: Animalia
- Phylum: Arthropoda
- Class: Insecta
- Order: Diptera
- Family: Tephritidae
- Subfamily: Tephritinae
- Tribe: Dithrycini
- Genus: Eurosta
- Species: E. solidaginis

Binomial name
- Eurosta solidaginis (Fitch, 1855)

Synonyms
- Ortalis nuphera Harris, 1835; Tephritis asteris Harris, 1841; Acinia solidaginis Fitch, 1855; Eurosta asteri Johnson, 1930; Eurosta subfascipennis Strickland, 1938

= Goldenrod gall fly =

Species of fly

The goldenrod gall fly (Eurosta solidaginis), also known as the goldenrod ball gallmaker, is a species of fly native to North America. The species is best known for the characteristic galls it forms on several species in the Solidago, or goldenrod, genus. The fly's eggs are inserted near the developing buds of the plant. After hatching, the larvae migrate to an area below the plant's developing buds, where they then induce the plant's tissues to form into the hardened, bulbous chamber referred to as a gall. E. solidaginis’s interactions with its host plant(s) and insect, as well as avian, predators have made it the centerpiece of much ecological and evolutionary biology research, and its tolerance of freezing temperatures has inspired studies into the anti-freeze properties of its biochemistry.

== Taxonomy ==
Eurosta solidaginis is in the order Diptera and the family Tephritidae. The Tephritidae are commonly referred to as fruit flies, a common name they share with the Drosophilidae family. The goldenrod gall fly was first put into the genus Eurosta by D. W. Cocquillet in 1910. Two subspecies exist: E. solidaginis subsp. solidaginis and E. solidaginis subsp. fascipennis, distinguished morphologically by differences in hyaline regions of the wing margin. The former subspecies can be further subdivided into two host races, one of which forms galls in Solidago altissima and the other in S. gigantea.

== Distribution ==
Eurosta solidaginis is widely distributed across the United States, ranging from Washington all the way to the eastern seaboard. The two subspecies occupy different ranges, with E. solidaginis subsp. solidaginis being found from the east coast to Minnesota and the Dakotas, up to the southeastern provinces of Canada, and down the southern border of the United States. E. solidaginis subsp. fascipennis, on the other hand, can be found as far west as Washington and as far east as Minnesota.

== Behavior and ecology ==
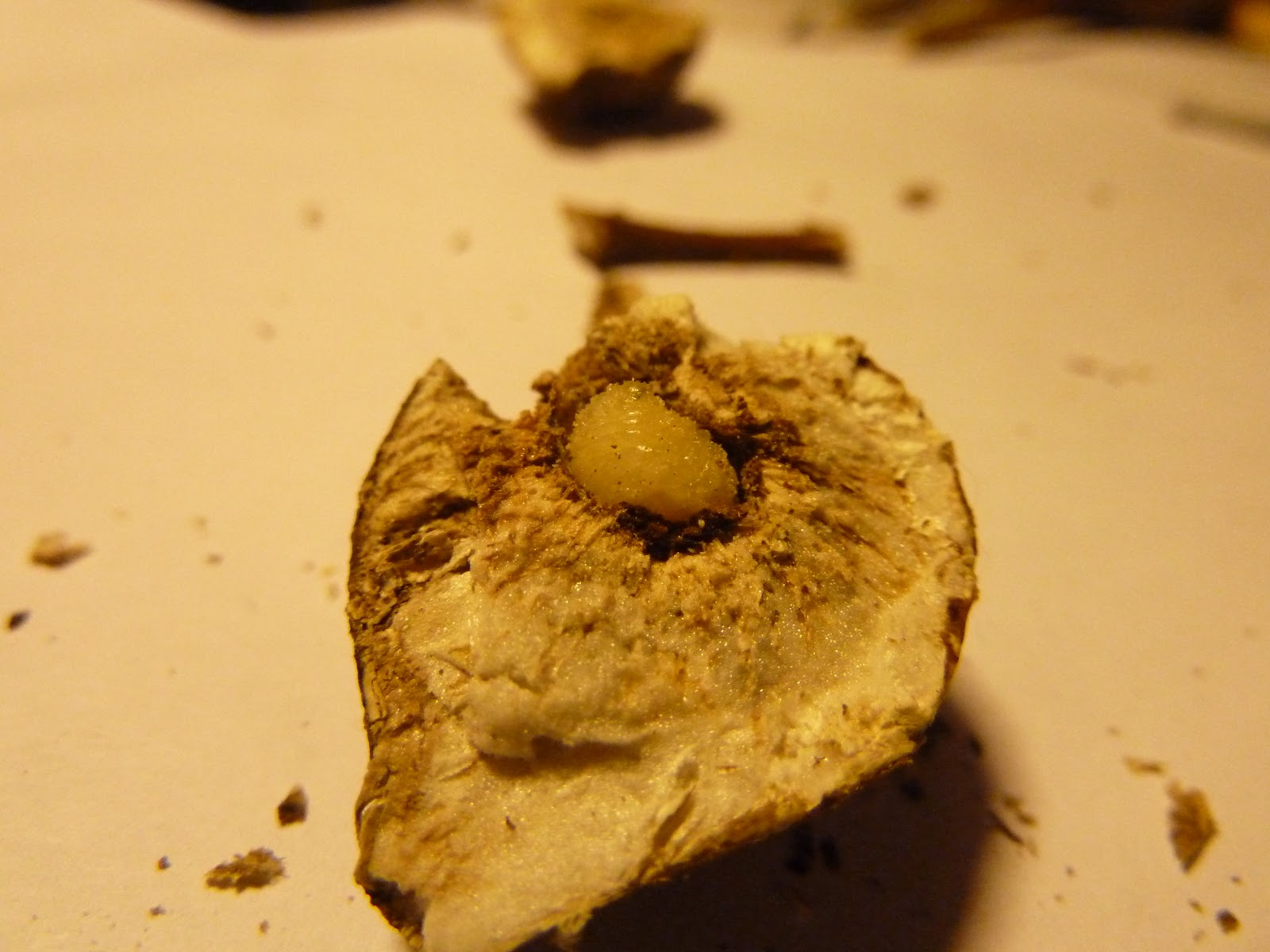
A Eurosta solidaginis larva in a freshly dissected gall.

Adult E. solidaginis emerge from their galls in the spring, with the males emerging prior to the females. The flies proceed to mate on goldenrod plants, and the females use their ovipositors to insert fertilized eggs into the buds of the goldenrod.

Though E. solidaginis has been reported to form galls on seven different species of goldenrod, only three appear to be common targets: Solidago canadensis, S. gigantea and S. altissima. Once the larvae hatch, typically between 5 and 8 days after the egg is laid, the larva eats its way to the base of the goldenrod bud and induces a gall. These galls serve as food sources and shelters from rain, wind and ice. Despite being the larva's overwintering structure, the gall itself does not provide significant insulation. Instead, the larva itself has robust freezing tolerance. The larva feeds on the tissues of the gall and molts twice before excavating a narrow exit tunnel out of the gall in mid-September. After digging its tunnel, without actually opening up the gall to the outside, the larva overwinters and, if it survives, molts into an adult and leaves the gall the following spring.

A number of predators and parasites prey on the larvae of E. solidaginis. The black-capped chickadee (Poecile atricapillus) and the downy woodpecker (Picoides pubescens) target large galls, breaking them open and removing the larva living inside. The parasitic wasps Eurytoma obtusiventris and E. gigantea also target the gallmaker. The former injects its eggs directly into E. solidaginis larvae prior to gall formation, whereas the latter oviposits into the gall itself. In both cases, the E. solidaginis larvae are consumed. There is also Mordellistena unicolor, a beetle whose larvae, after hatching on the surface of a gall, burrow their way in and feed off of its nutritive tissues. M. unicolor typically kills the E. solidaginis larva inhabiting the gall, but this does not appear to be an essential part of its life cycle. One of the upshots of these interactions is that larvae that produce galls of a moderate size – that is, not small and thin enough for wasps to easily penetrate, but not large enough to attract the attention of birds – have a fitness advantage. In addition to these direct, predatory interactions, a negative correlation has been observed between goldenrod defoliation by Trirhabda beetles, suggesting that competition for plant resources may also have an important role to play in the Eurosta/Solidago system.

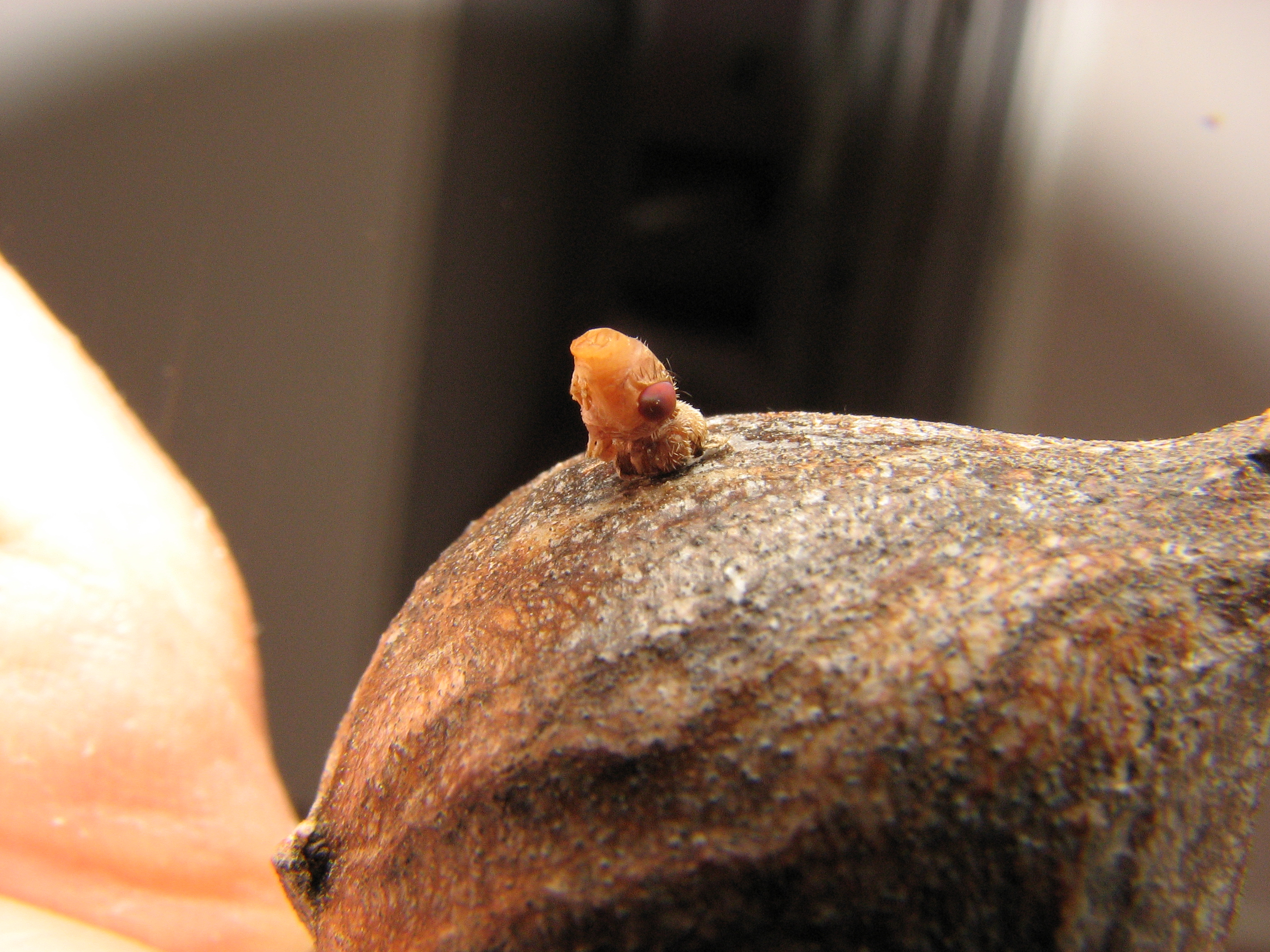
Adult emerging from gall. Notice the ptilinum on the head

== Physiology ==
The ability of E. solidaginis to survive the freezing temperatures of winter has been the subject of much research. In response to dropping temperatures and the senescence of surrounding plant tissues, the larva begins to synthesize and accumulate sorbitol and glycerol in its tissues. These compounds help protect the larvae against freezing damage by lowering the melting point of their bodily fluids, thus reducing the amount of ice that can form. Aquaporins, membrane proteins involved in the channeling of water, have also been shown to play a key role in E. solidaginis’ freezing tolerance. As ice forms in the larva's bodily fluids, solutes in the unfrozen liquid are concentrated, creating a strong osmotic gradient. In species like E. solidaginis that can channel water quickly enough in response to this freezing stress, water rapidly travels to the solute-rich extracellular environment, switching places with cryoprotectant molecules like glycerol, thus protecting the larva's tissues. Upregulation of these aquaporin proteins in the winter seasons corroborates the hypothesis that they play a key role in freezing tolerance. It has also been found that mild winter temperatures are detrimental to the survival rate of E. solidaginis, with researchers speculating that cool or freezing temperatures may actually benefit the insect by allowing it to conserve energy
