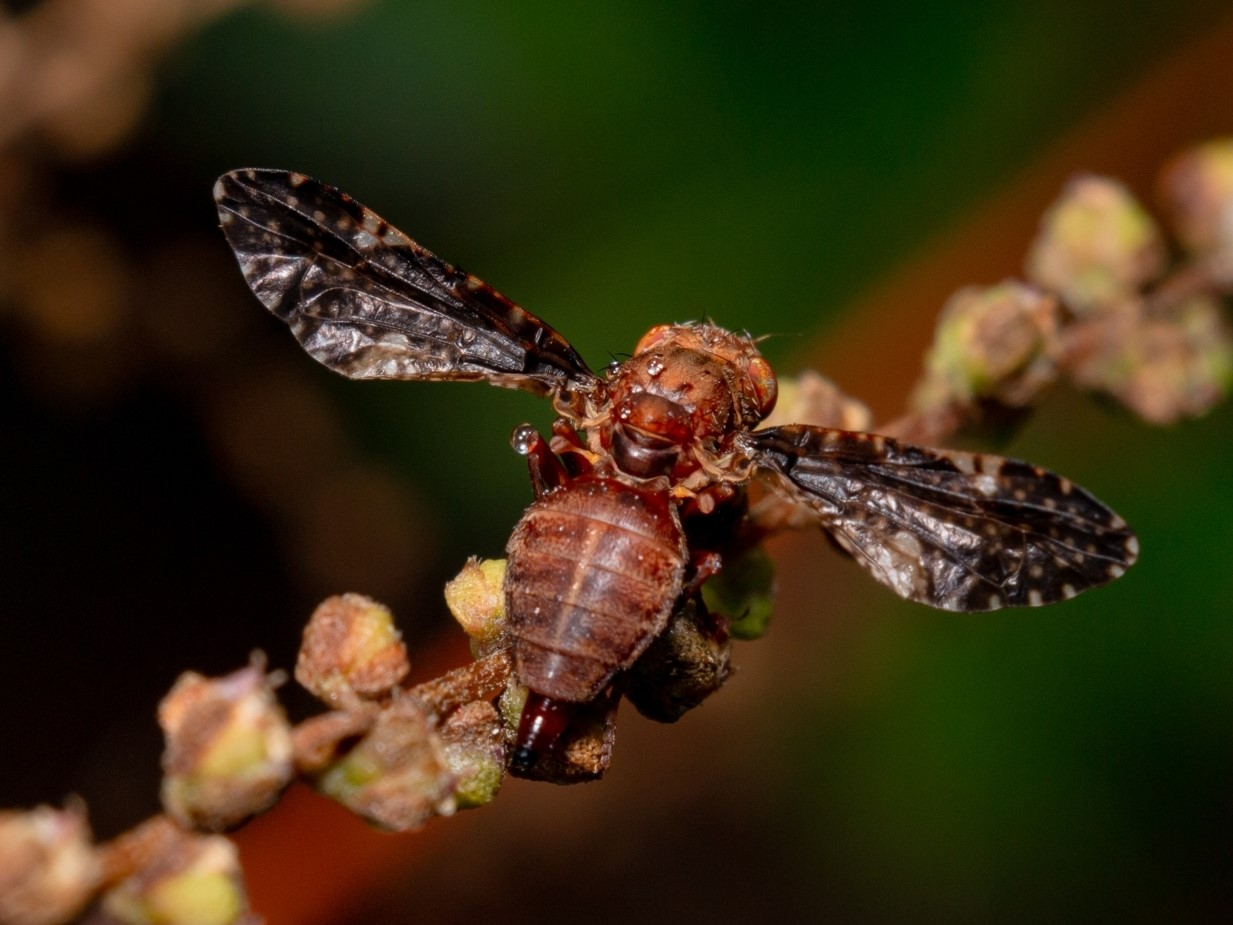

Scientific classification
- Kingdom: Animalia
- Phylum: Arthropoda
- Class: Insecta
- Order: Diptera
- Family: Tephritidae
- Subfamily: Tephritinae
- Tribe: Dithrycini
- Genus: Eurosta
- Species: E. floridensis

Binomial name
- Eurosta floridensis Foote, 1977

= Eurosta floridensis =

Species of fly

Eurosta floridensis is a species of tephritid or fruit flies in the genus Eurosta of the family Tephritidae.

== Distribution ==
United States.
