= Eurosta comma =

Scientific classification
- Kingdom: Animalia
- Phylum: Arthropoda
- Class: Insecta
- Order: Diptera
- Family: Tephritidae
- Subfamily: Tephritinae
- Tribe: Dithrycini
- Genus: Eurosta
- Species: E. comma

Binomial name
- Eurosta comma (Wiedemann, 1830)

Synonyms
- Carphotricha marginepunctata (Macquart, 1835); Eurosta elsa (Macquart, 1835); Tephritis marginepunctata Wiedemann, 1830; Trypeta alvea Walker, 1849; Trypeta comma Daecke, 1910; Trypeta dertona Macquart, 1835

Species of fly

Eurosta comma is a species of tephritid or fruit flies in the genus Eurosta of the family Tephritidae.

== Distribution ==
United States.
