= Houghton-Douglass Falls =

Waterfall in Houghton County, Michigan

- Houghton Falls, Douglass Houghton Falls
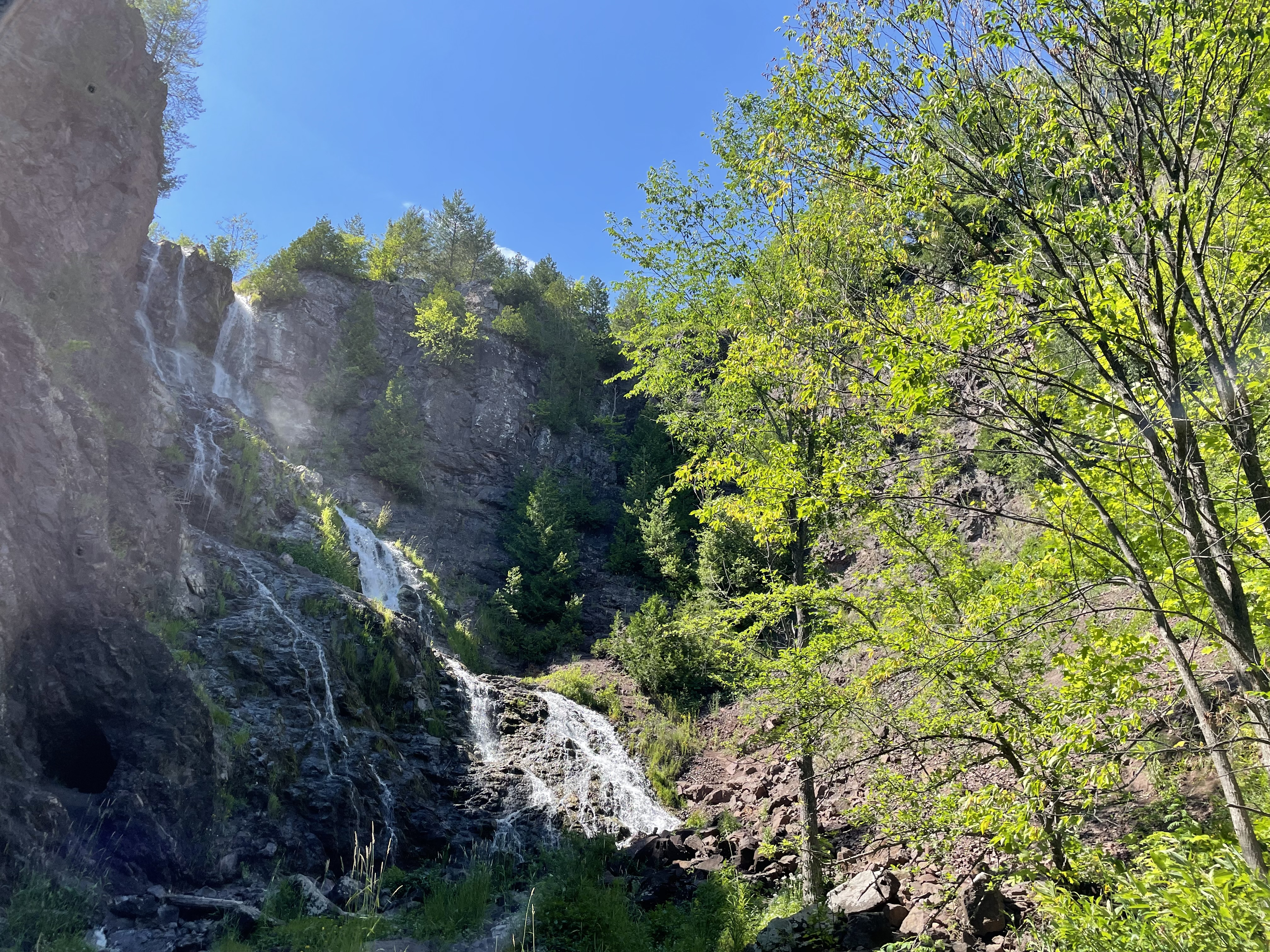
- Houghton-Douglass Falls in July 2022

- Location within Michigan
- Location: Houghton County, Michigan
- Coordinates: 47.20700°N 88.42758°W
- Type: Cascade
- Total height: 110 feet (34 m)
- Number of drops: 1
- Watercourse: Hammell Creek

Houghton-Douglass Falls (also known as Douglass Houghton Falls, Douglass Falls or Houghton Falls) is a waterfall in the U.S. state of Michigan. At 110 feet (34 m) from the top to its base, it is Michigan's tallest waterfall. It is located in the state's Upper Peninsula between the villages of Laurium and Lake Linden just off Highway M-26. It is designated by the state as a Scenic Site and Veterans Memorial Park, and named after Douglass Houghton – Michigan's first state geologist – and his cousin and assistant Columbus Christopher Douglass.

The waterfall is situated in a deep gorge that is flanked by sharp loose rock. Multiple deaths have been reported at this location, including one in September 2011. Part of the Keweenaw Peninsula, the falls expose two layers of volcanic rock which have been folded over younger, softer sandstone. The site includes 115 acres (47 ha) of land along Hammell Creek and frontage along M-26.

The property was purchased in 1949 by the Kuusisto family, then sold to the state in 2018 by Jim Kuusisto, a Vietnam War veteran who wished the site to be preserved as a veterans memorial. The Michigan Department of Natural Resources paid $300,000 (equivalent to $368,000 in 2024) and began developments for visitor accessibility and safety. Phase 1 was completed in 2025, adding an access road and parking, a vault toilet, and a pedestrian bridge over the creek. Phase 2, projected for completion in 2027, includes a trail to the falls, safety improvements, observation platforms, and the veterans memorial.

== See also ==
- Hungarian Falls
- List of waterfalls
