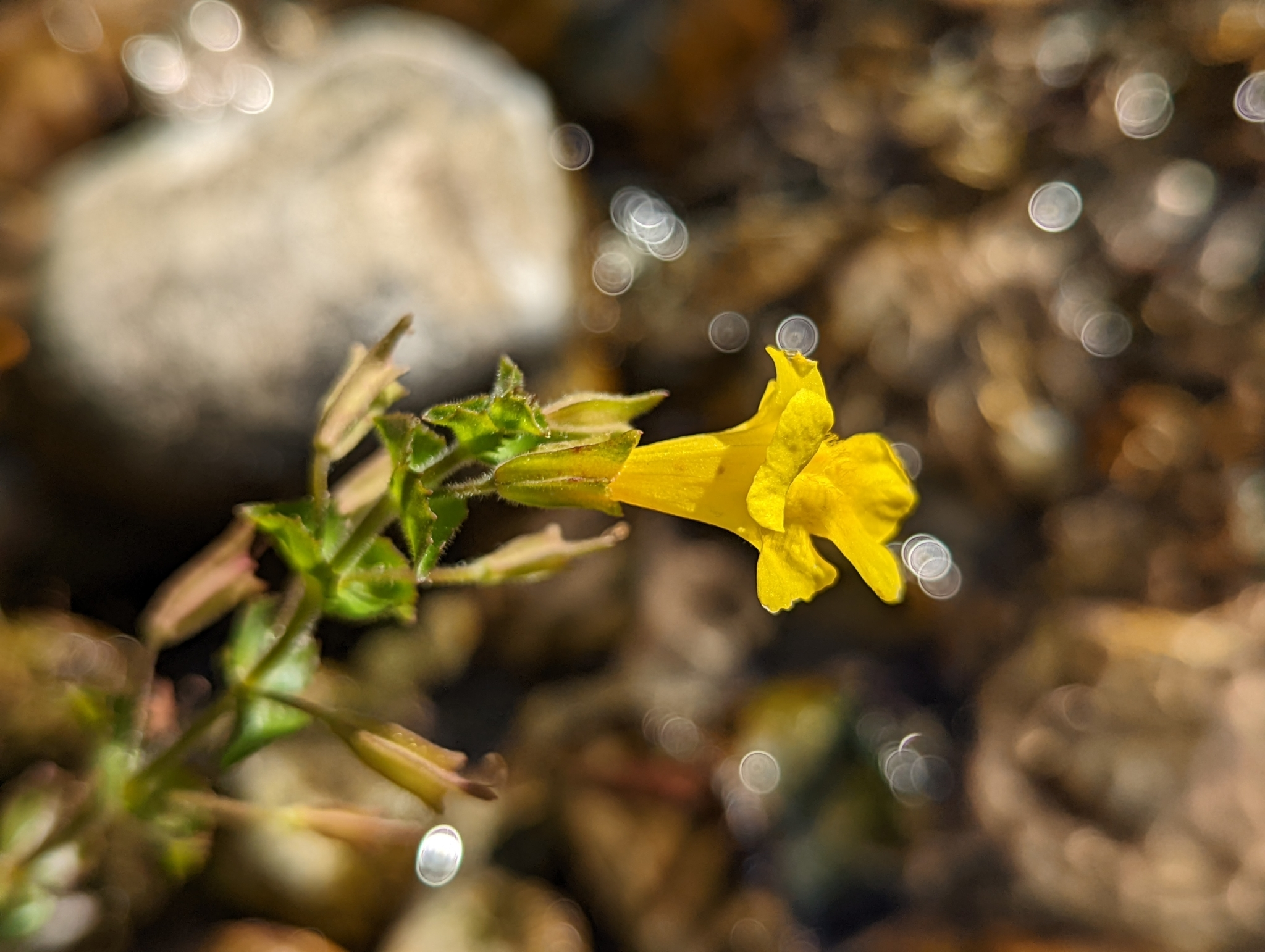

Conservation status
- Critically Imperiled (NatureServe)

- Endangered (ESA)

Scientific classification
- Kingdom: Plantae
- Clade: Embryophytes
- Clade: Tracheophytes
- Clade: Angiosperms
- Clade: Eudicots
- Clade: Asterids
- Order: Lamiales
- Family: Phrymaceae
- Genus: Erythranthe
- Species: E. michiganensis

Binomial name
- Erythranthe michiganensis (Pennell) G.L.Nesom

Synonyms
- Mimulus glabratus subsp. michiganensis Pennell; Mimulus glabratus var. michiganensis (Pennell) Fassett; Mimulus michiganensis (Pennell) Posto & Prather

= Erythranthe michiganensis =

Species of flowering plant

Erythranthe michiganensis (formerly Mimulus glabratus var. michiganensis and Mimulus michiganensis) is a rare species of flowering plant in the lopseed family, known by the common name Michigan monkeyflower. This species occurs only in the Grand Traverse and Mackinac Straits and some southeast areas within the American state of Michigan. It is one of only three plant species that are endemic to Michigan, with the other two being Voss's Goldenrod and Packera insulae-regalis.

It is restricted to a specific type of habitat (wet areas with a calcium-containing substrate), and one that is being degraded and lost to development. It was federally listed as an endangered species of the United States in 1990.

== Description ==
Erythranthe michiganensis is an aquatic or semi-aquatic plant and produces mat-like clumps of decumbent stems up to 36 centimeters long. The stems root at the nodes that come in contact with wet substrate and send up new stems from there. Many clumps containing hundreds of stems may all belong to a single genetic individual. The oppositely-arranged leaves have toothed edges. Flowers grow from the leaf axils, each borne on a pedicel, the length of which is often longer than the leaves.

The tubular yellow flower is 1.6 to 2.7 centimeters long and has a wide mouth with two lobes on the upper lip and three on the lower lip. The lower lip and throat may be speckled with red. The lower lip is coated in yellow hairs. It serves as a landing spot for pollinating insects; however, the plant produces little viable pollen, so it is likely that most of the reproduction is vegetative via stolons, rather than sexual via seed. Biological dispersal then takes place as pieces break off and float downstream. Blooming occurs in mid-June through mid-July, and sometimes extends into August, or rarely September or October.

== Distribution ==
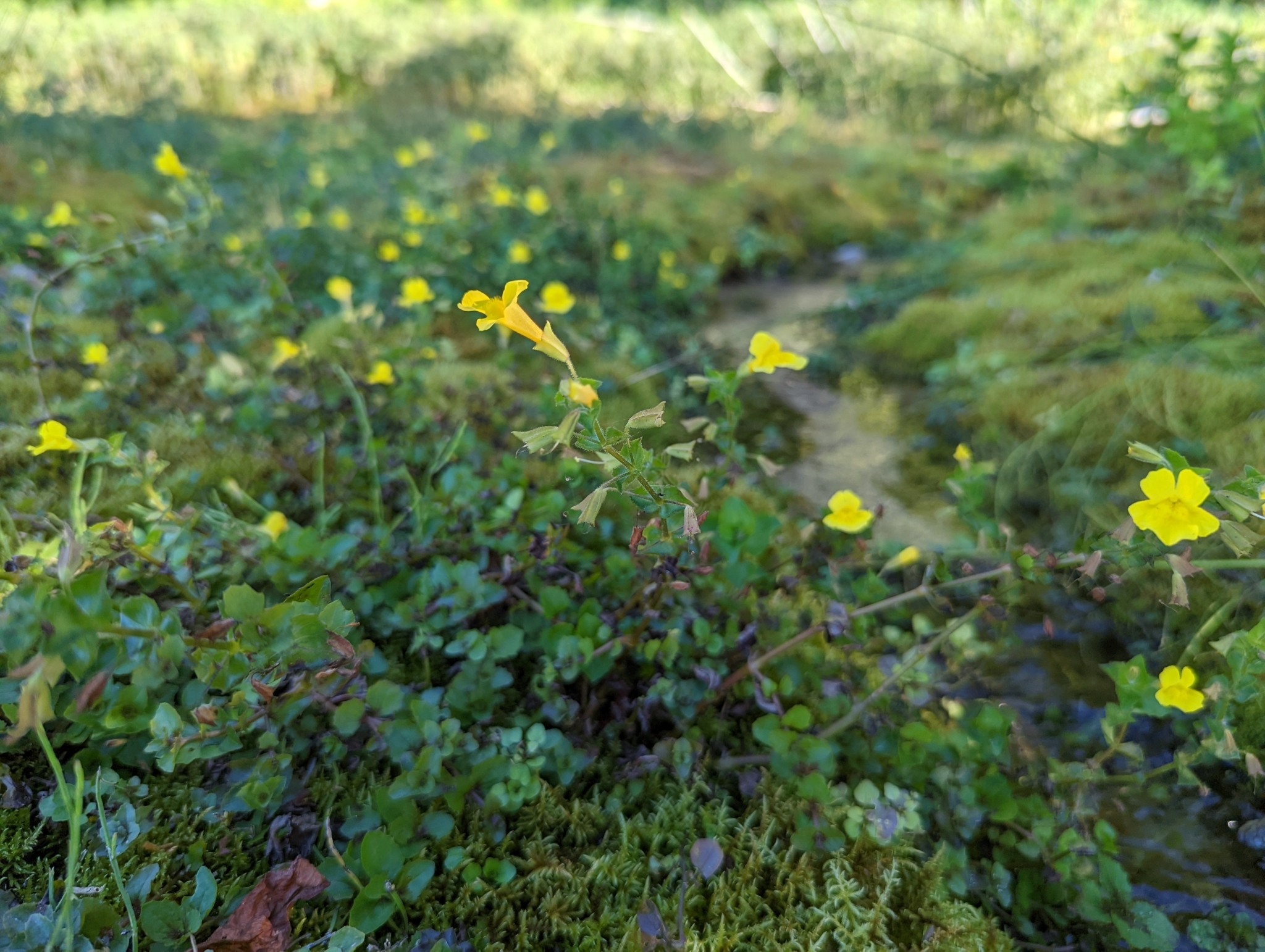
Michigan monkeyflower near Traverse City, 2022

Erythranthe michiganensis is found almost exclusively on the shores of the Great Lakes (Lake Michigan and Lake Huron), or what were ancient shorelines. It grows on lakesides and stream banks in wet, saturated soils or in very shallow water. It requires cold, clear flowing water in full sunlight. The substrate is sand covered in muck, often with calcium compounds below. It also appears to require a narrow pH range that is slightly alkaline. The habitat is the edges of forests dominated by northern white cedar (Thuja occidentalis). Other plants in the area may include touch-me-not (Impatiens capensis), water forget-me-not (Myosotis scorpioides), watercress (Nasturtium officinale), wild mint (Mentha arvensis), and marsh marigold (Caltha palustris).

There are seventeen known occurrences of this plant, but two of these have not been observed recently. The largest occurrences are at Glen Lake, Burt Lake, and the shoreline of Mackinac County. It can be found at Sleeping Bear Dunes National Lakeshore. Many of the occurrences are on privately owned land. One population was located after a biologist found a specimen used as a garnish on his plate at a restaurant.

The plant has proven resilient at times; it has been noted to persist in dry conditions and after being mowed when it appeared in the lawn of a home. It can also live without sunlight in darker areas of the forest understory, albeit in sterile form.

== Conservation ==
This rare plant depends on a continuous flow of cold, clear spring water. It is threatened by human activities that disrupt this flow, such as groundwater pumping and diversion and natural processes such as storms and periodic high lake levels. Degradation of the habitat is also a threat, and may come from residential development and recreational use. Development has caused the extirpation of at least three occurrences. Conservation efforts will require direct protection of plants and prevention of alterations to the local water regime. Because the plant probably uses cloning as its primary method of reproduction, the number of genetically-different individuals is probably low, making populations more vulnerable.
