= Lucius Lee Hubbard =

American geologist

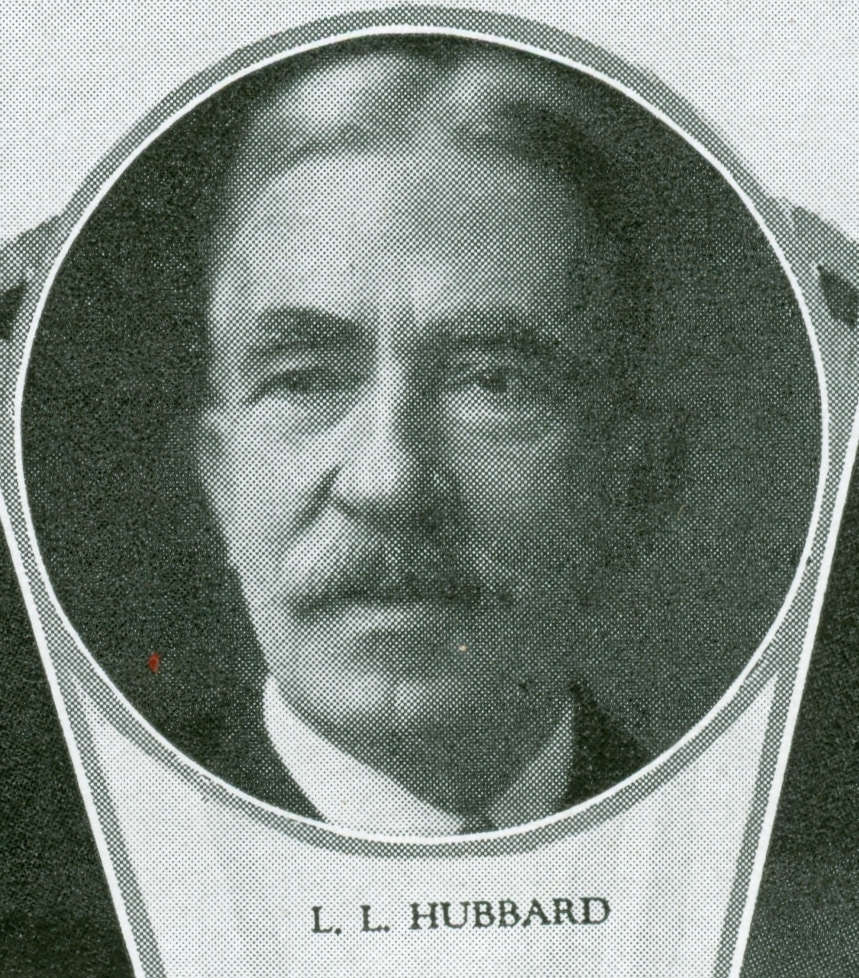
- Born: August 7, 1849; Cincinnati, Ohio
- Died: August 3, 1933 (aged 83); Eagle Harbor, Michigan

Lucius Lee Hubbard (August 7, 1849 – August 3, 1933) was an American geologist. He served as State Geologist of Michigan from 1893 to 1899 and on the Board of Regents of the University of Michigan.

== Biography ==
Hubbard was born on August 7, 1849, in Cincinnati, Ohio, and was the only child of Lucius Virgilius and Annie Elizabeth (Lee) Hubbard.

From 1891 to 1893, Hubbard was the Assistant State Geologist of Michigan under Marshman E. Wadsworth. When Wadsworth resigned as State Geologist of Michigan in 1893, Hubbard was appointed to the position. Hubbard reorganized the Geological Survey and discontinued its ties to the Michigan College of Mines and the University of Michigan. He resigned the position in 1899, dissatisfied with the Survey and obstacles to his work.

Following his tenure with the Survey, Hubbard served as general manager of the Copper Range Mining Co. and the Champion Copper Co., and later as president of the Ojibway Mining Co. In 1903, the two-story Hubbard House was built for him at 31 Hubbard Avenue in Painesdale, Michigan, though he only lived there for two years. In 1905, he was appointed to the Board of Control of the Michigan College of Mines, a post he held until 1917. In 1910, he was appointed to the Board of Regents of the University of Michigan, and was elected in 1911 and each year afterward until 1933.

In his later years, Hubbard was a snowbird, living in Florida during the winter and Michigan's Keweenaw Peninsula in summer. On August 3, 1933, Hubbard died in Eagle Harbor, Michigan.

Hubbard collected a large library of Americana, portions of which were sold in 1914 and 1935.
