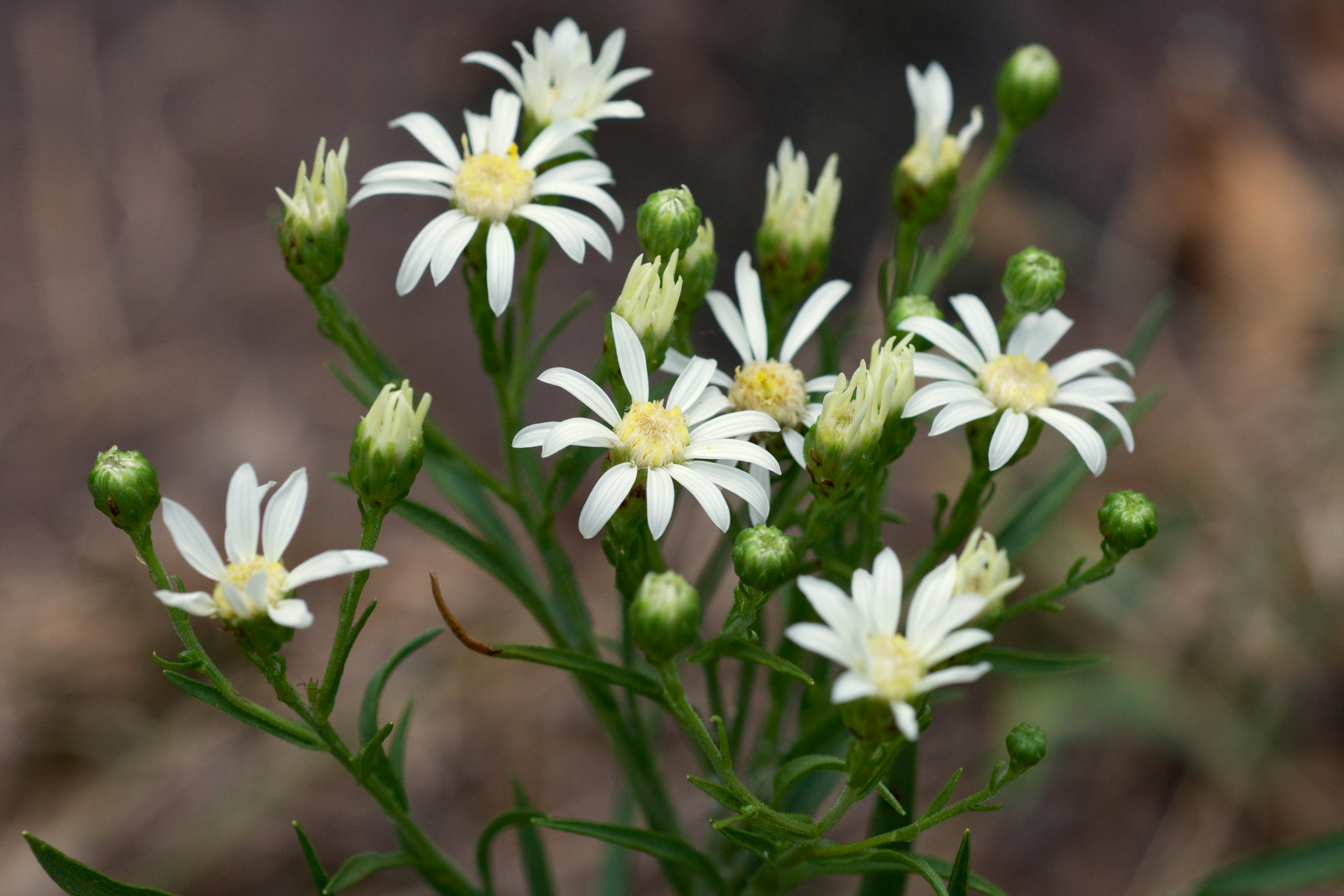

Conservation status
- Secure (NatureServe)

Scientific classification
- Kingdom: Plantae
- Clade: Tracheophytes
- Clade: Angiosperms
- Clade: Eudicots
- Clade: Asterids
- Order: Asterales
- Family: Asteraceae
- Genus: Solidago
- Section: S. sect. Ptarmicoidei
- Species: S. ptarmicoides

Binomial name
- Solidago ptarmicoides (Torr. & A.Gray) B.Boivin

Synonyms
- Synonymy: Aster albus (Nutt.) Eaton 1829 not Willd. ex Spreng. 1826; Aster ptarmicoides Torr. & A. Gray; Chrysopsis alba Nutt.; Diplopappus albus (Nutt.) Lindl. ex Hook.; Doellingeria ptarmicoides Nees; Eucephalus albus (Nutt.) Nutt.; Heleastrum album (Nutt.) DC.; Inula alba Nutt.; Oligoneuron album (Nutt.) G. L. Nesom; Solidago asteroides Semple; Solidago bernardii B. Boivin; Unamia alba (Nutt.) Rydb.; Unamia ptarmicoides (Nees) Greene

= Solidago ptarmicoides =

Species of flowering plant

Solidago ptarmicoides, the prairie goldenrod, white flat-top goldenrod or upland white aster, is a North American perennial flowering plant in the family Asteraceae. It is native to the central and eastern Canada (from New Brunswick to Manitoba) and parts of the United States (mostly Great Lakes region, the Northeast, the Ozarks, and the northern Great Plains, with isolated populations in Wyoming, Colorado, Oklahoma, and scattered locations in the Southeast. It has also been called upland white solidago, upland white goldenrod, and sneezewort goldenrod

== Description ==
Solidago ptarmicoides is distinctive within the genus in having white to cream-colored flowers, in heads arranged in a flat-topped corymb rather than in an elongated raceme. One plant can sometimes produce as many as 50 small heads. Leaves are narrow and linear, often rather stiff. The species prefers dry, sandy soils and grassy meadows.

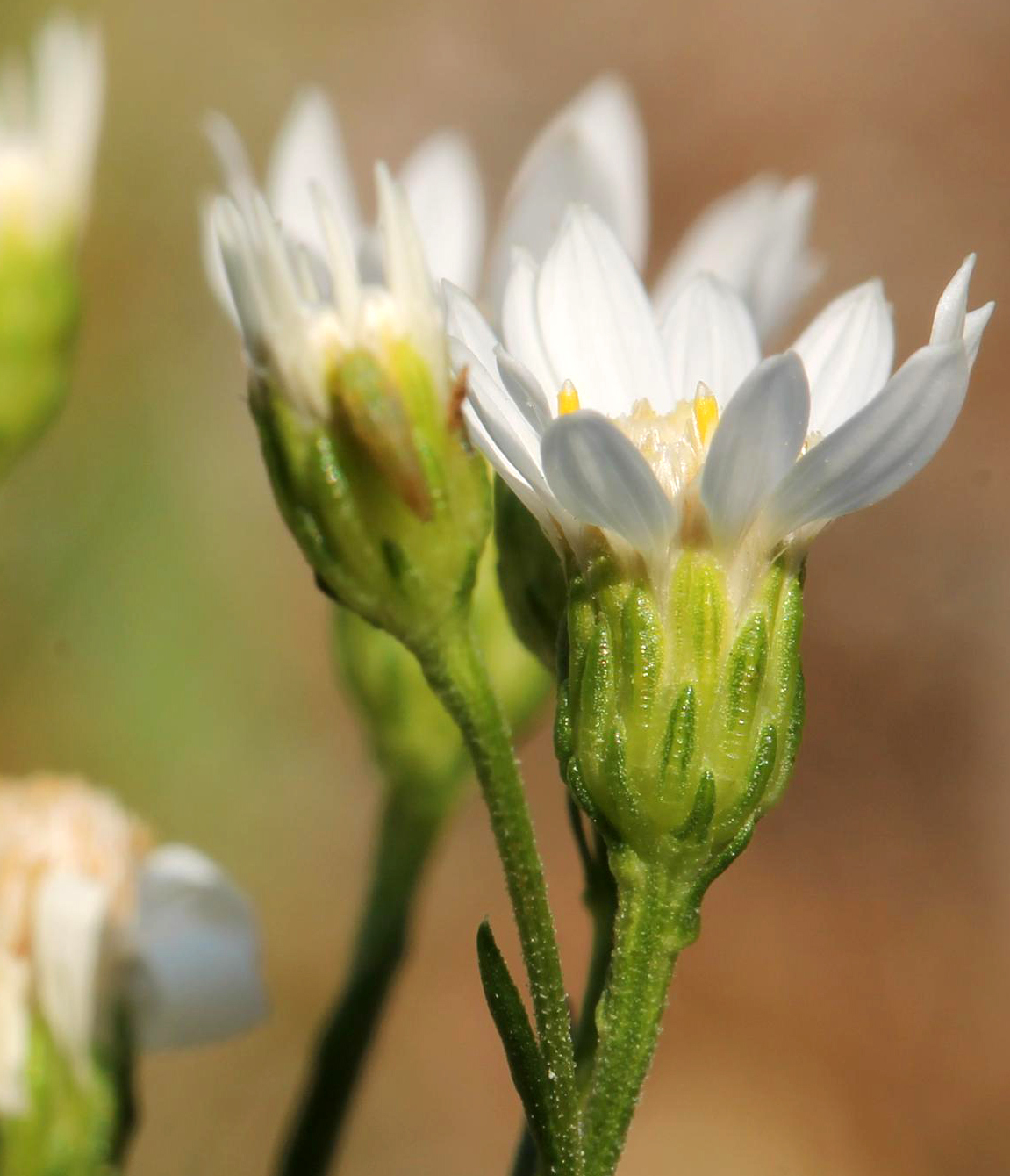
Flowerheads

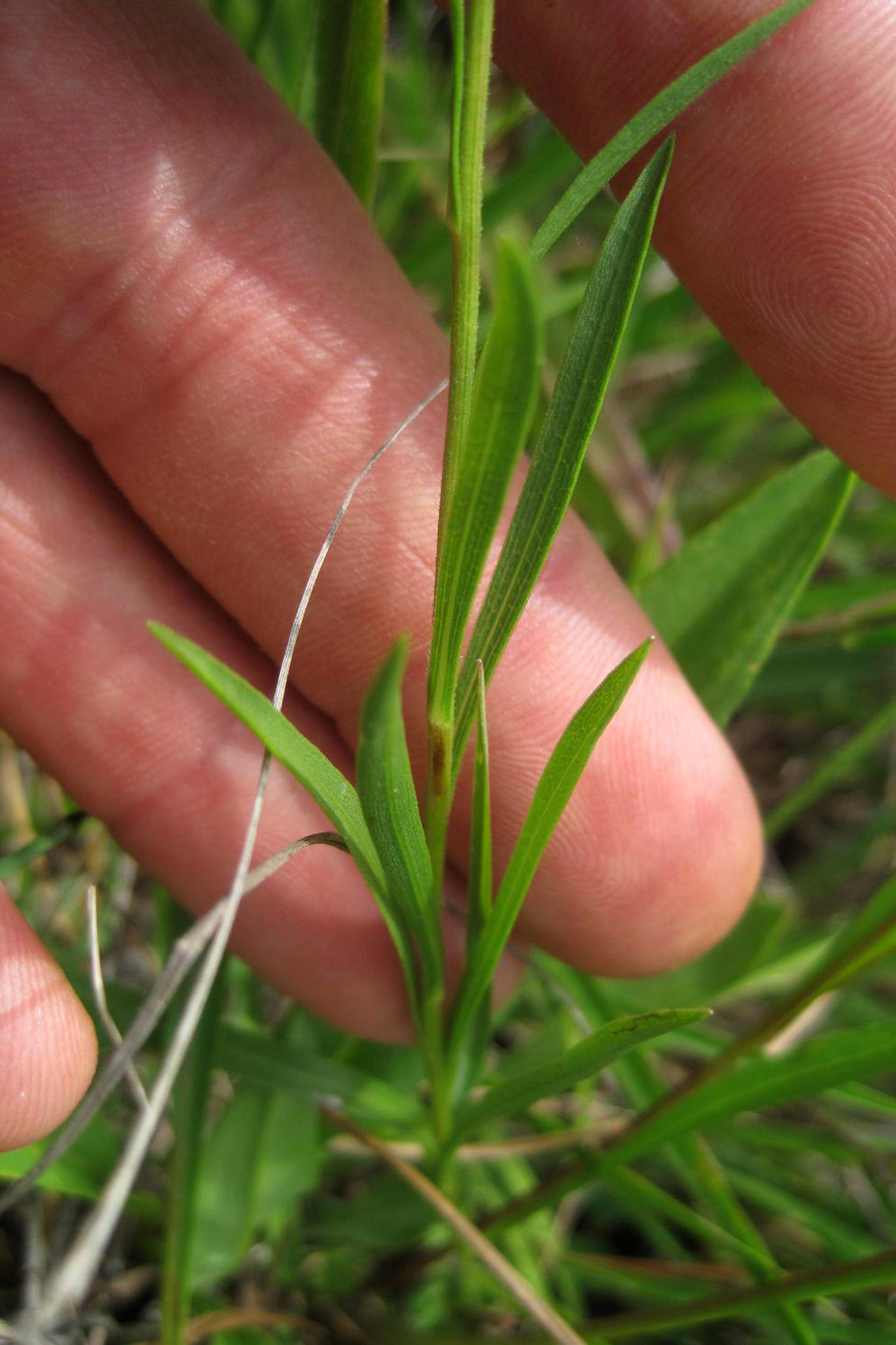
Narrow leaves

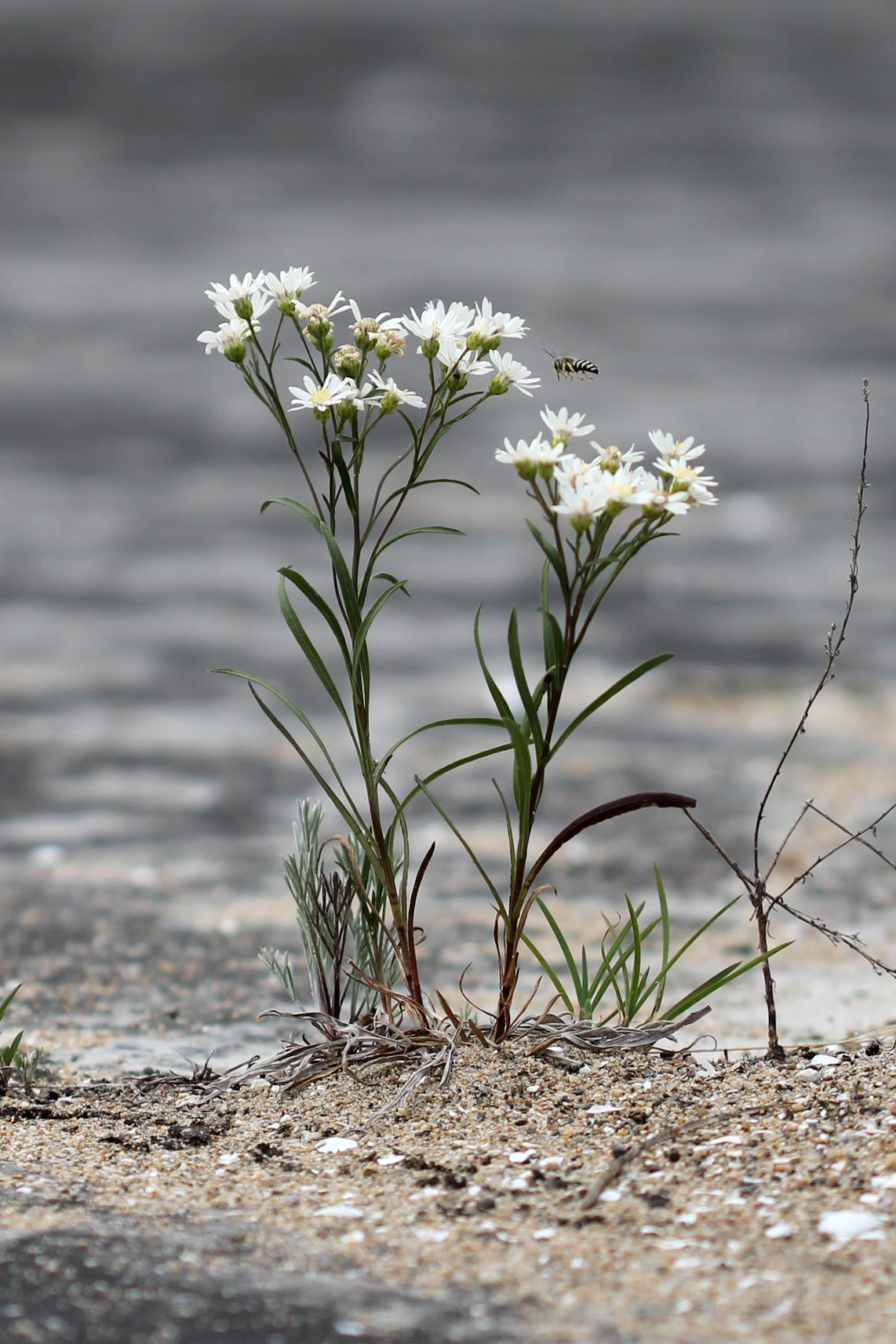
Mature plants

== Conservation status in the United States ==
The plant is listed as endangered in Connecticut, Massachusetts, New Hampshire, North Carolina, and Tennessee, as rare in Indiana, and as presumed extirpated in Ohio.
