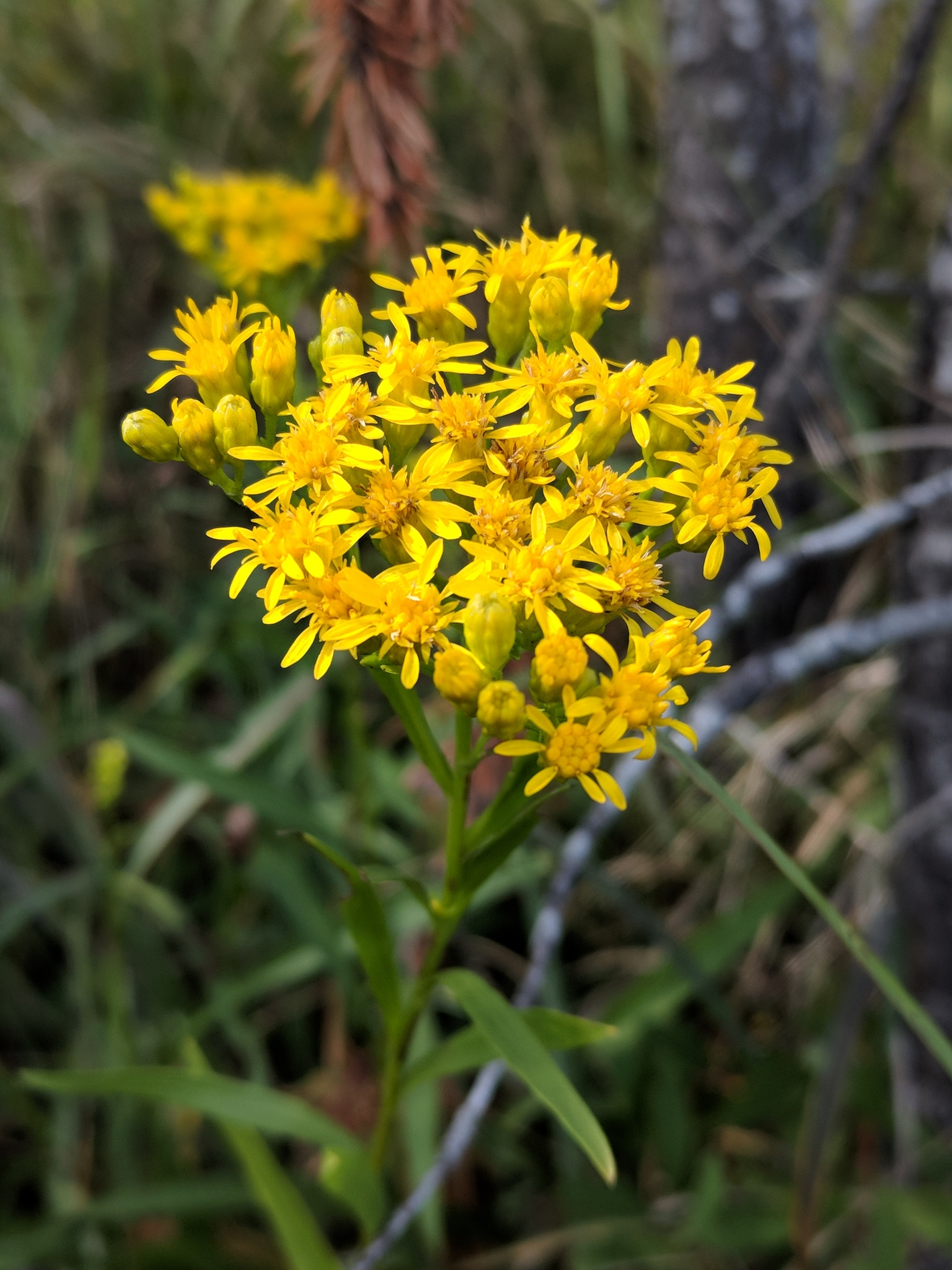

Scientific classification
- Kingdom: Plantae
- Clade: Tracheophytes
- Clade: Angiosperms
- Clade: Eudicots
- Clade: Asterids
- Order: Asterales
- Family: Asteraceae
- Genus: Solidago
- Section: S. sect. Ptarmicoidei
- Species: S. vossii

Binomial name
- Solidago vossii J.S.Pringle & Laureto

= Solidago vossii =

Species of flowering plant

Solidago vossii is a flowering plant in the family Asteraceae known as Voss's goldenrod. It is endemic to Michigan in the United States. It was first formally named in 2010 by James Scott Pringle & Pamela J. Laureto. The type locality is from Howe's Lake, west of Grayling in Crawford County. It is closely related to Solidago houghtonii.
