= Alfred Church Lane =

American geologist and teacher (1863–1948)

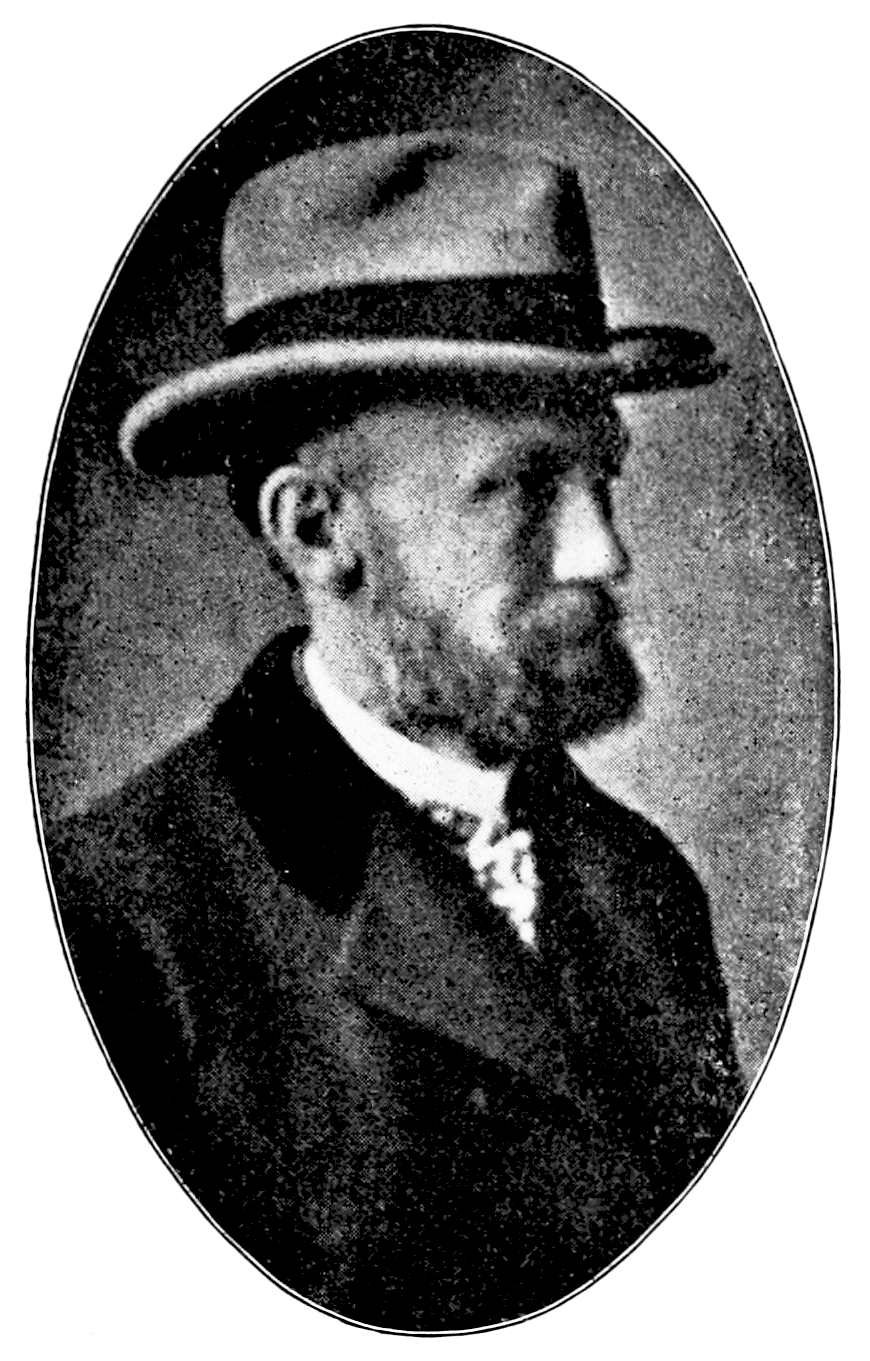
Alfred Church Lane

Alfred Church Lane (January 29, 1863 – April 15, 1948) was an American geologist and teacher.

Born in Boston, Alfred C. Lane was educated at Harvard University and received his A.B. degree in 1883. Between 1883 and 1885 he taught mathematics at Harvard, then studied at the University of Heidelberg until 1887 before returning to Harvard to earn his Ph.D. in 1888. The following year he joined the Michigan State Geologic Survey as a petrographer, and he remained in that post into 1892 while also serving as an instructor at the Michigan College of Mines. He became assistant state geologist for Michigan in 1892, and from 1899 to 1909 he was the state geologist. Finally, he joined Tufts College in 1892, becoming the Pearson professor of geology and mineralogy. He retired from the college in 1936 as professor emeritus.

While at Tufts, he served as vice president of the AAAS Division of Geology in 1907. He received an honorary D.Sc. from Tufts in 1913. From 1922 and 1946 he was chairman for the Committee on the Measurement of Geologic Time for the National Research Council. He served as a member of the Board of Visitors at Harvard Observatory in 1924. Alfred Lane was appointed as consultant of science to the Library of Congress in 1929; the first person to hold that post. In 1931, he was president of the Geological Society of America. He was awarded the Ballou Medal by Tufts College in 1940 for "distinguished service to education and the nation". During his career, he authored 1,087 publications.
