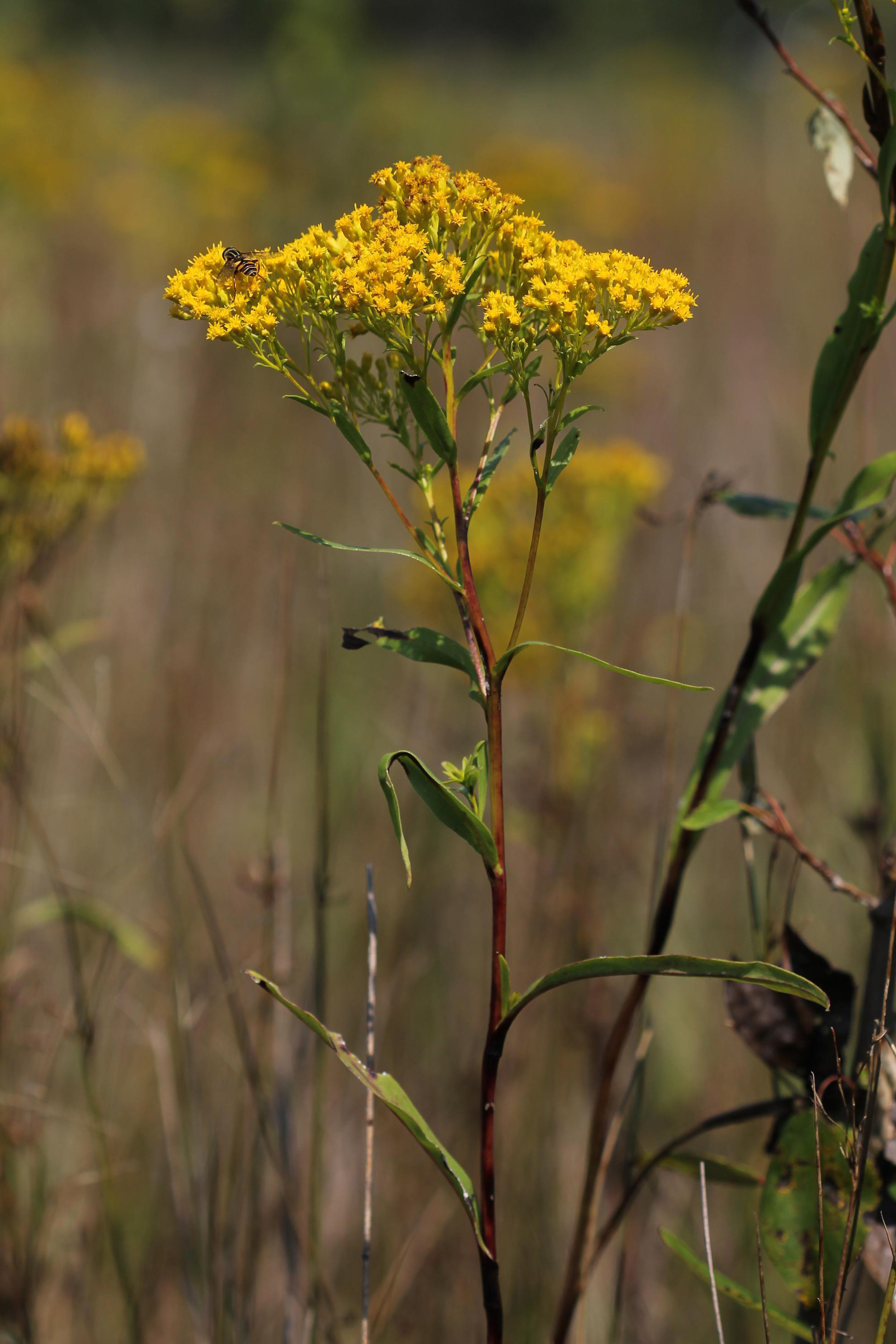

Scientific classification
- Kingdom: Plantae
- Clade: Tracheophytes
- Clade: Angiosperms
- Clade: Eudicots
- Clade: Asterids
- Order: Asterales
- Family: Asteraceae
- Genus: Solidago
- Section: S. sect. Ptarmicoidei
- Species: S. ohioensis

Binomial name
- Solidago ohioensis Riddell

Synonyms
- Aster ohioensis (Riddell) Kuntze; Oligoneuron ohioense (Frank ex Riddell) G.N.Jones

= Solidago ohioensis =

Species of flowering plant

Solidago ohioensis is a North American plant species in the family Asteraceae, called the Ohio goldenrod. It is found primarily in the Great Lakes region of Canada and the United States, in Ontario, New York, Ohio, Michigan, Wisconsin, Indiana, and Illinois.

Solidago ohioensis is a perennial herb up to 100 cm (39 inches) tall. The leaves are narrow, up to 25 cm (10 inches) long. One plant can produce as many as 500 small yellow flower heads in a compact branching array at the top of the plant. The plant grows in marshes, on sand dunes, and along the banks of rivers.
