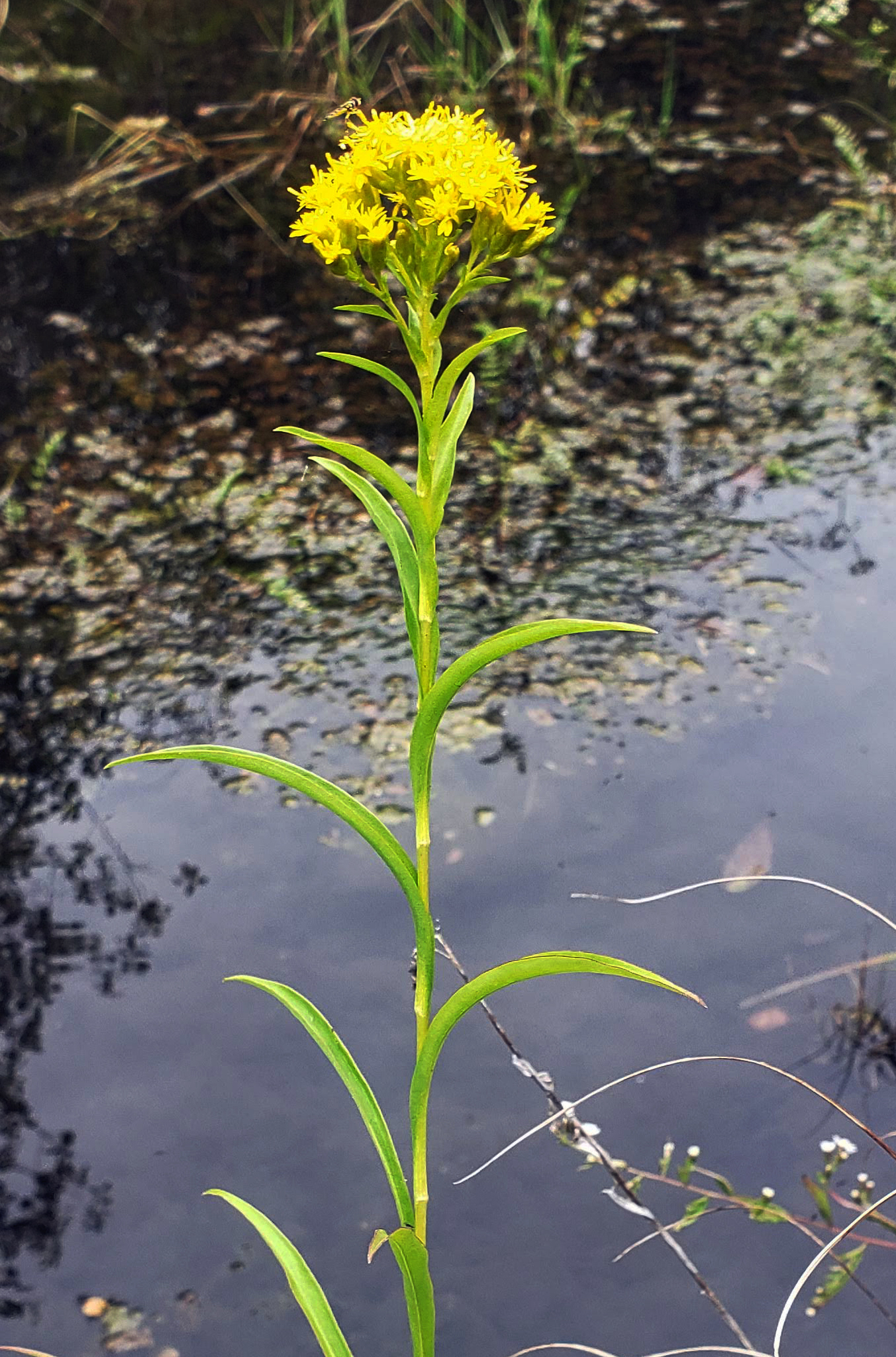

Scientific classification
- Kingdom: Plantae
- Clade: Tracheophytes
- Clade: Angiosperms
- Clade: Eudicots
- Clade: Asterids
- Order: Asterales
- Family: Asteraceae
- Genus: Solidago
- Section: S. sect. Ptarmicoidei
- Species: S. riddellii

Binomial name
- Solidago riddellii Frank

Synonyms
- Aster riddelii (Frank ex Frank) Kuntze; Oligoneuron riddellii Rydb.; Solidago amplexicaulis M.Martens

= Solidago riddellii =

Species of flowering plant

Solidago riddellii, known as Riddell's goldenrod, is a North American plant species in the genus Solidago of the family Asteraceae. It grows primarily in the Great Lakes and eastern Great Plains of Canada and the United States. It is sometimes considered part of the genus Oligoneuron, but as a Solidago, included in the section Solidago sect. Ptarmicoidei, the flat-topped goldenrods.

== Description ==
Solidago riddellii is a perennial herb up to 100 cm (40 inches) tall, with a branching underground caudex. One plant system can produce as many as ten stems. The leaves are long and narrow, up to 25 cm (10 inches) long, produced along the stems as well as at the base. One stem can sometimes produce as many as 450 small yellow flower heads, each with 7–9 ray florets surrounding 6–10 disc florets.

== Distribution and habitat ==
Riddell's goldenrod is known from Manitoba and Ontario, Canada. The core of its range in the United States is in prairie regions of Minnesota, Iowa, southern Wisconsin, northern Illinois and Indiana, southern Michigan, and Ohio. There are reports of isolated populations in Georgia, Arkansas, and southwestern South Dakota.

It grows in wet prairies and marshy areas.
