= Douglass Houghton =

American geologist (1809–1845)

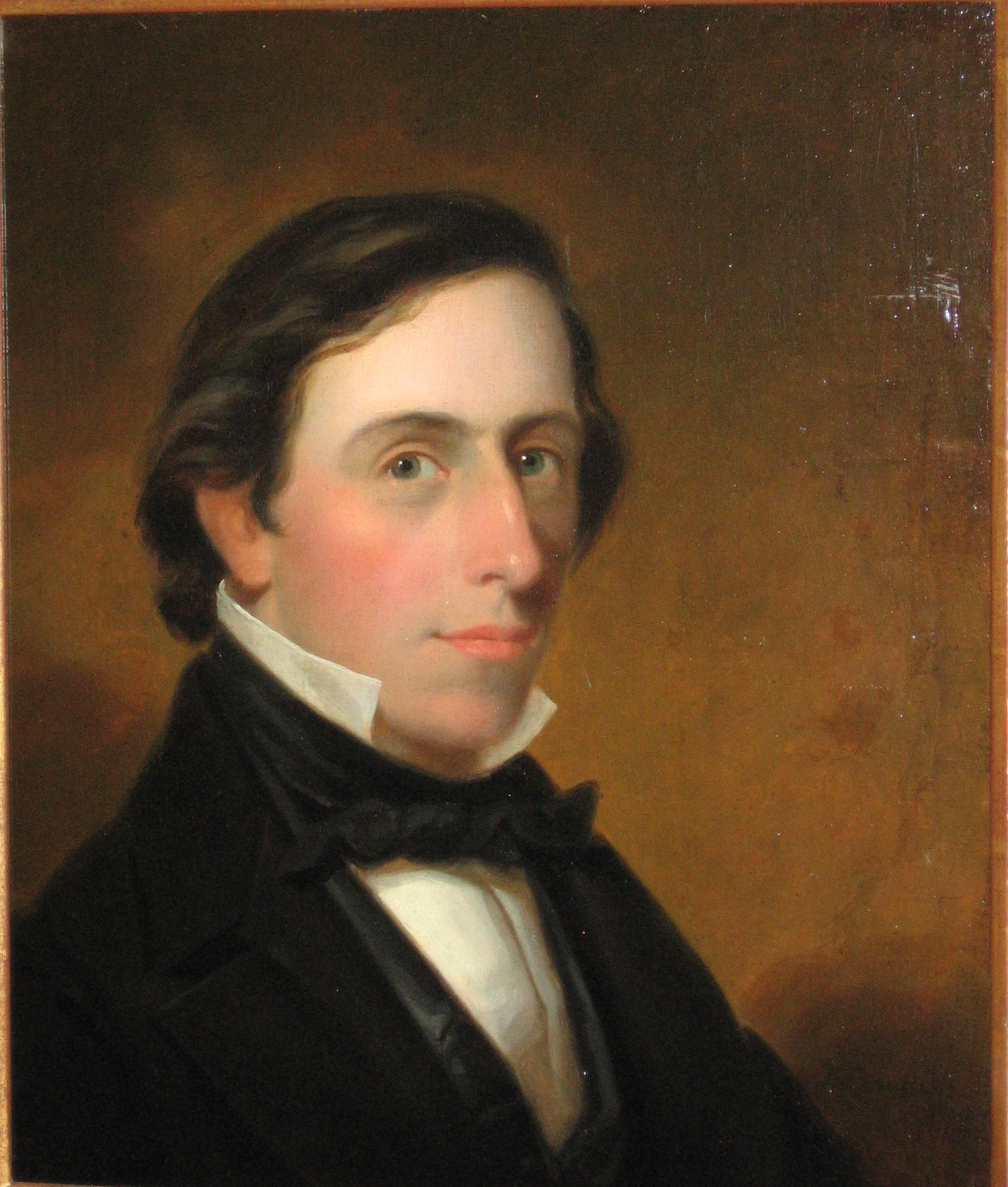
- Douglass Houghton; Oil on board by Alvah Bradish (1850)

1st State Geologist of Michigan
- In office 1839–1845
- Succeeded by: Alexander Winchell

17th Mayor of Detroit
- In office 1842–1842
- Preceded by: Zina Pitcher
- Succeeded by: Zina Pitcher

Personal details
- Born: September 21, 1809 Troy, New York
- Died: October 13, 1845 (aged 36) Lake Superior near Eagle River, Michigan
- Party: Democratic

Douglass Houghton (September 21, 1809 – October 13, 1845) was an American geologist and medical doctor, primarily known for his exploration of the Keweenaw Peninsula of Michigan. It was the site of a copper boom and extensive copper mining beginning in the 19th century. He was appointed in 1839 as the first state geologist of Michigan, after it was admitted to the Union, and served in that position for the rest of his life.

== Early life and education ==
Douglass Houghton was born in Troy, New York, the son of Jacob Houghton, a lawyer and later a county judge, and Mary Lydia (Douglass). Raised in a close-knit, cultured home in Fredonia, New York, Douglass was a small person with a nervous, active temperament inclined toward the practical and scientific. He exhibited early his lifelong interest in the natural world. In spite of a slight speech impediment and facial scarring from a youthful experiment with gunpowder, he was at ease with all levels of society.

In 1829 Houghton entered the Rensselaer School in Troy, where, under the direction of Amos Eaton, scientific training was emphasized, particularly in geology. That same year he received both the bachelor's degree and a teaching appointment in chemistry and natural history at the school. He also studied medicine with a doctor friend of his family, and in 1831 received a license to practice.

== Career ==
In 1830 the city fathers of Detroit consulted with Eaton about their search for a public lecturer on science; he strongly recommended the youthful Houghton. He was enthusiastically received in Detroit and rapidly became one of its best-known citizens, with the young men of his acquaintance soon styling themselves "the Houghton boys".

Houghton quickly was selected by Henry Rowe Schoolcraft, US Indian Agent and geologist, to act as physician-naturalist on expeditions through Lake Superior and the upper Mississippi valley in 1831 and 1832. On these trips Houghton did extensive botanical collecting, investigated the Lake Superior copper deposits of Michigan's Upper Peninsula, and provided medical care to the Indian tribes they encountered. Most of Houghton's botanical specimens from these expeditions are at the University of Michigan Herbarium (MICH). Houghton administered more than 2,000 smallpox vaccinations to Indians in the Chippewa region over the course of his two months exploring with Henry Schoolcraft in 1832, undoubtedly saving many lives. Houghton estimated that the disease had appeared among the Chippewa at least five times in the previous 60 years.

In 1833 Houghton married his childhood friend Harriet Stevens; they had two daughters together. He established a flourishing medical practice in Detroit and earned the affectionate description: "the little doctor, our Dr. Houghton". By 1836 he had largely set aside the medical profession to concentrate on real estate speculation. His scientific interests remained strong, however. As Michigan achieved statehood in 1837, Houghton returned to public life and his love of the natural world.

One of the first acts of the new Michigan state government was to organize a state geological survey, following a pattern already established in other states. Houghton's appointment as the first state geologist was unanimously hailed, and he occupied that position for the remainder of his life.

In 1839 he was also named the first professor of geology, mineralogy, and chemistry at the University of Michigan in Ann Arbor. He continued to reside in Detroit. He and his survey assistants spent many weeks in the field each season, mapping and evaluating Michigan's natural resources, and his personal influence with state legislators kept the project moving in the face of many financial difficulties. His fourth annual report, based on field work done in 1840, appeared February 1, 1841. It helped trigger the first great mining boom of American history, and earned him the title of "father of copper mining in the United States".

He was a founding member and treasurer of the Association of American Geologists and Naturalists (the predecessor of the American Association for the Advancement of Science) and served on several of its committees. A lifelong Episcopalian and staunch Democrat, he was elected to a term as Mayor of Detroit in 1842, apparently against his wishes. He administered competently, raising the possibility of higher political office, perhaps governor.

== Death ==
In 1845, with the state survey moribund because of the lack of funds, Houghton organized a combined linear and geological survey of the Lake Superior region that was funded by the federal government. While working on that survey, he and two companions drowned in Lake Superior near Eagle River, Michigan, when their small boat capsized in a storm. His demise sent waves of shock through Michigan and the entire country. His reluctance to yield to the expressed concerns of his voyageurs about the worsening weather conditions may have contributed to the disaster. His remains were discovered on the shoreline the next spring 1846 and returned to Detroit, where they were buried in Elmwood Cemetery. Neither of the surveys on which he was working at the time was ever completed.

== Legacy ==
Although Houghton resided in Detroit during his years in Michigan, he is strongly associated with the Keweenaw Peninsula. He explored the area in 1831 and 1832, and conducted a survey of the peninsula in 1840 as State Geologist of the newly formed state. Houghton's 1841 survey report was 88 pages in length; for more than 27 pages he discussed the copper and copper ore he had seen in his travels. He famously concluded, "the copper ores are not only of superior quality, but also that their associations are such as to render them easily reduced". He noted that samples of ore he had tested were richer than the copper ore then being mined in Cornwall. His warning against prospectors rushing to the area in hopes of striking it rich became famous during the copper boom: "look closely before the step is taken, which will most certainly end in disappointment and ruin". However, to his death Houghton never came to realize that in the Keweenaw ores like those in Cornwall were present in vanishingly small amounts, and all the copper mined turned out to be native, pure copper. Nevertheless, Houghton's report prompted a major rush of settlers to the peninsula.

Houghton's place in American history is somewhat problematic. Although he was the state geologist of Michigan for eight years, he never completed a comprehensive final report of his findings. One major reason may have been his early and unexpected death at the age of 36. He had multiple skills to apply, but he was not always successful in reconciling the conflicting demands of the various roles he filled. As a scientist his potential seems to have been considerable, but his death prevented that potential from being fully realized.

- The city of Houghton, Houghton County, Houghton Lake, the largest inland lake in the state, and Douglass Houghton Falls, southeast of Calumet, are among many Michigan features named in his honor.
- Douglass Houghton Hall, a residence hall at Michigan Technological University, was named for him.
- A plaque commemorating Houghton is at the entrance to the Department of Geological Sciences (now Earth and Environmental Sciences) at the University of Michigan.
- A plaque embedded into a stone monument was erected in the town of Eagle River, just a few miles from where his boat sank.
- He and three other professors are memorialized by a monument near the University of Michigan's Graduate Library, which features a broken pillar symbolizing lives cut short.
- In 2006 the University of Michigan created the Douglass Houghton Scholars Program, designed to encourage students interested in careers in science.
- Houghton's goldenrod (Solidago houghtonii) was named for him; he discovered this plant variety along the southern shore of the Upper Peninsula of Michigan, during his 1839 expedition.
- A portrait of Houghton hangs in the chamber of the Michigan House of Representatives.
- Douglass Houghton Elementary School in Waterford, Michigan, is named in his honor.
