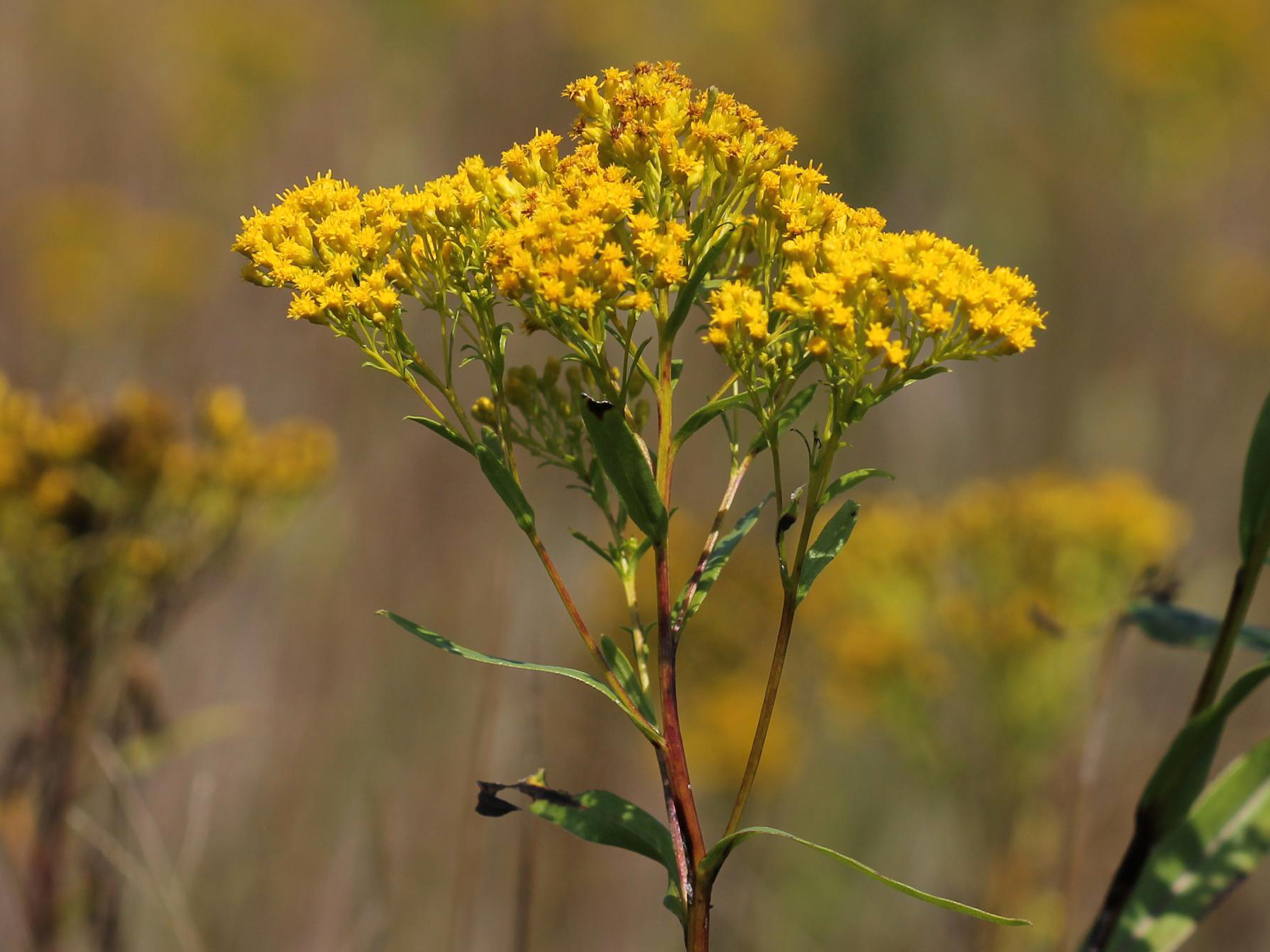
- Solidago ohioensis

Scientific classification
- Kingdom: Plantae
- Clade: Embryophytes
- Clade: Tracheophytes
- Clade: Angiosperms
- Clade: Eudicots
- Clade: Asterids
- Order: Asterales
- Family: Asteraceae
- Genus: Solidago
- Section: S. sect. Ptarmicoidei (House) Semple & Gandhi

Synonyms
- Aster sect. Ptarmicoidei House; Oligoneuron Small; Solidago ser. Corymbosae (Torrey & A. Gray) O. Hoffmann; Solidago subg. Oligoneuron (Small) House; Unamia Greene

= Solidago sect. Ptarmicoidei =

Section of flowering plants

Solidago sect. Ptarmicoidei is a section of flowering plants in the genus Solidago. They are sometimes considered a separate genus: Oligoneuron. Like related species they are known as goldenrods. This section contains seven species of perennial herbs, all native to North America. They are distinguished from other goldenrods by their corymbiform flowerheads, which are flat or rounded in profile and about as broad as tall or broader, for which they are sometimes called flat-topped goldenrods.

== Species ==
The following seven species are included in Solidago sect. Ptarmicoidei:

- Solidago houghtonii Torrey & A. Gray – Houghton's goldenrod
- Solidago nitida Torrey & A. Gray – shiny goldenrod
- Solidago ohioensis Riddell – Ohio goldenrod
- Solidago ptarmicoides (Torrey & A. Gray) B. Boivin – stiff aster
- Solidago riddellii Frank – Riddell's goldenrod
- Solidago rigida Linnaeus – stiff goldenrod
- Solidago vossii J.S.Pringle & Laureto – Voss's goldenrod
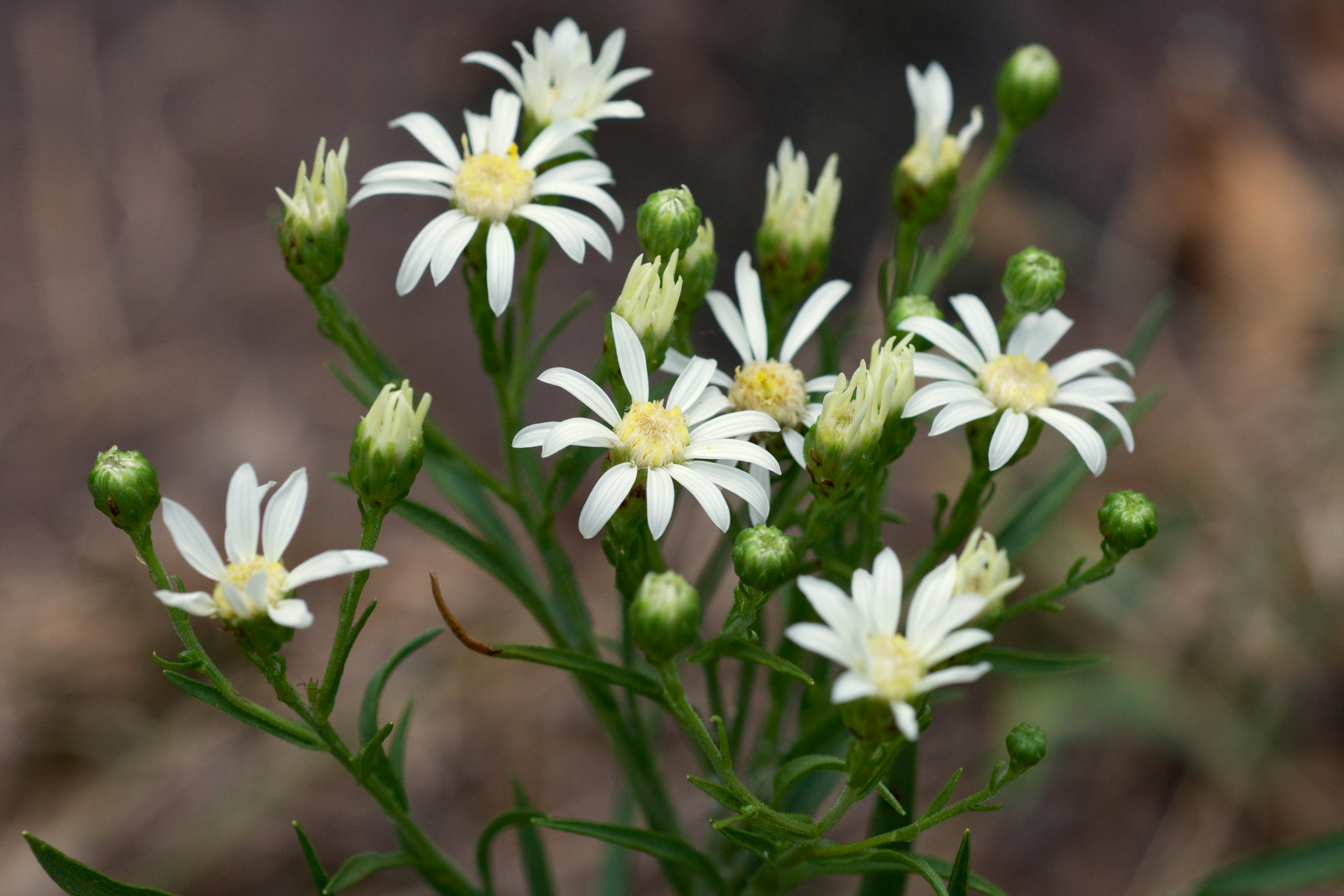
Solidago ptarmicoides

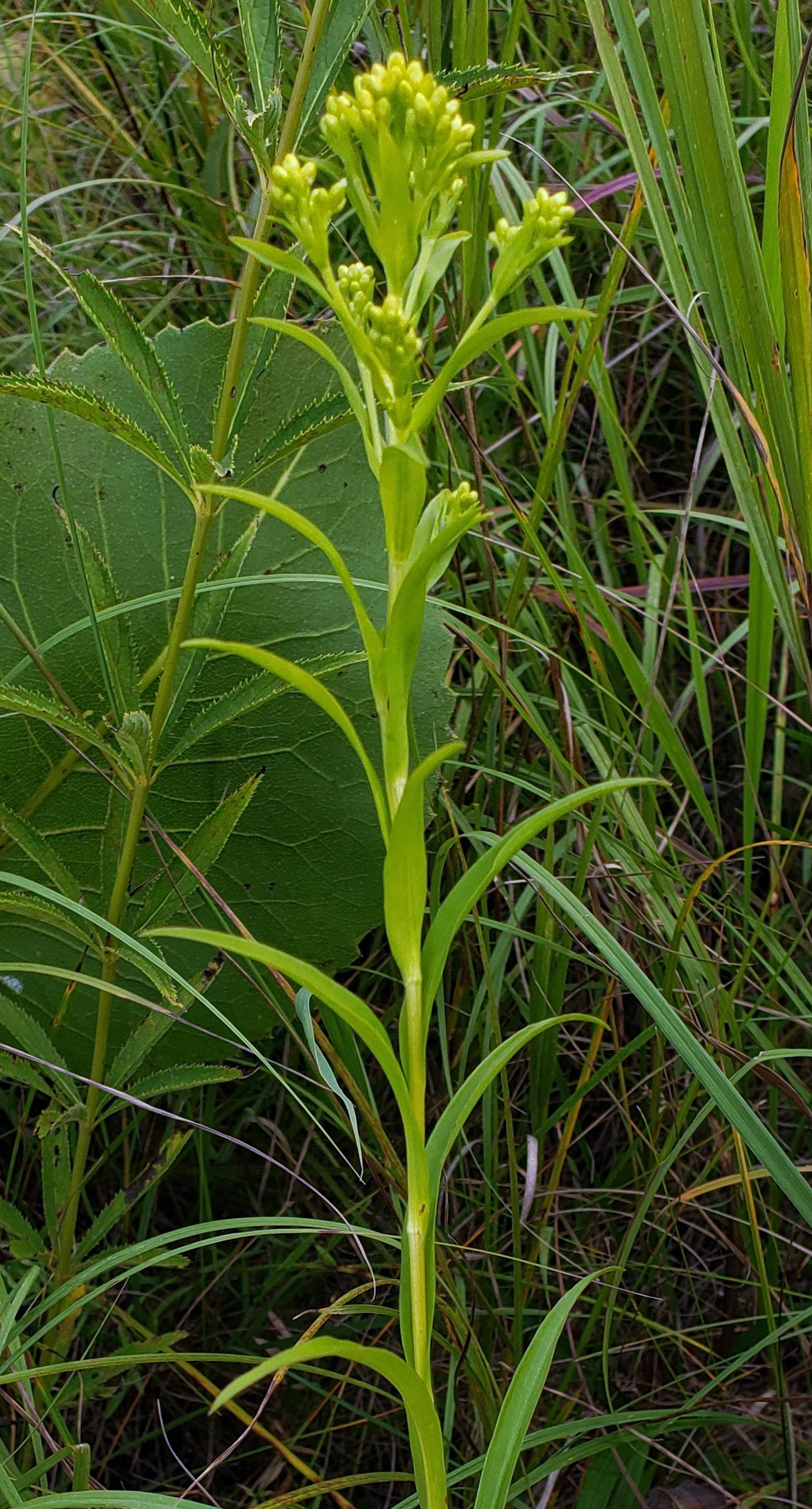
Solidago riddellii

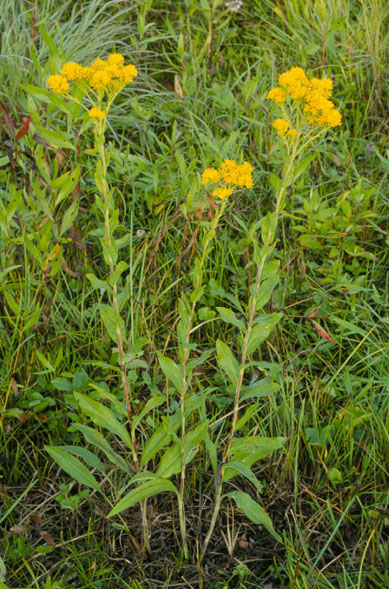
Solidago rigida

Named hybrids among members of the section include:

- Solidago × bernardii B.Boivin (S. ptarmicoides and S. riddellii) – creamy aster
- Solidago × maheuxii B.Boivin (S. riddellii and S. rigida var. humilis)
- Solidago × lutescens (Lindl. ex DC.) B.Boivin (S. ptarmicoides and S. rigida) – yellow upland goldenrod
- Solidago × krotkovii B.Boivin (S. ohioense and S. ptarmicoides) – Krotkov's goldenrod
