= Hungarian Falls =

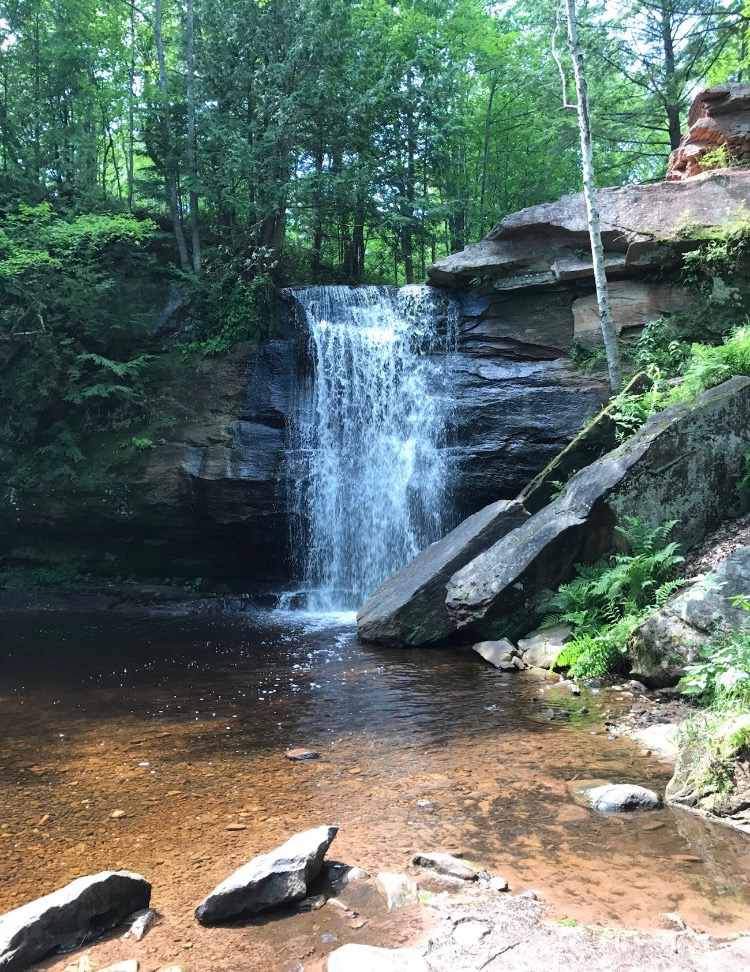
- The middle falls.
- Interactive map of Hungarian Falls
- Location: Hubbell, Houghton County, Michigan, United States
- Coordinates: 47.1700000°N 88.4416667°W
- Elevation: 696 ft (212 m)
- Total height: 90 ft (27 m)
- Number of drops: 3
- Longest drop: 50 ft (15 m)
- Average width: 5–10 ft (1.5–3.0 m)
- Watercourse: Dover Creek

Hungarian Falls is a series of waterfalls in the Dover Creek west of Hubbell, in Houghton County, Michigan. The site is near State Highway 26 in the Upper Peninsula of Michigan. There are three drops with the largest being 50 feet. The total height of the falls is 90 feet. The base of the waterfall is made up of Jacobsville Sandstone, a type of rock common in that area. Hungarian Falls is also near Michigan's tallest waterfall, Houghton Falls.

== Images ==
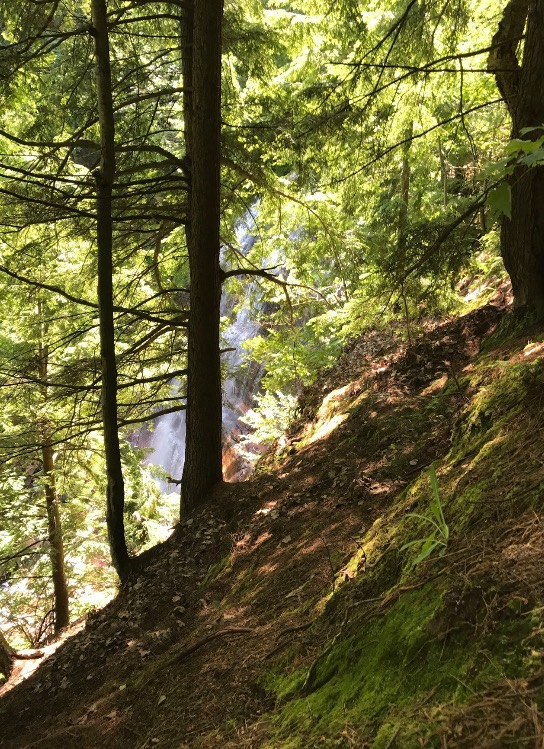
The lower falls.

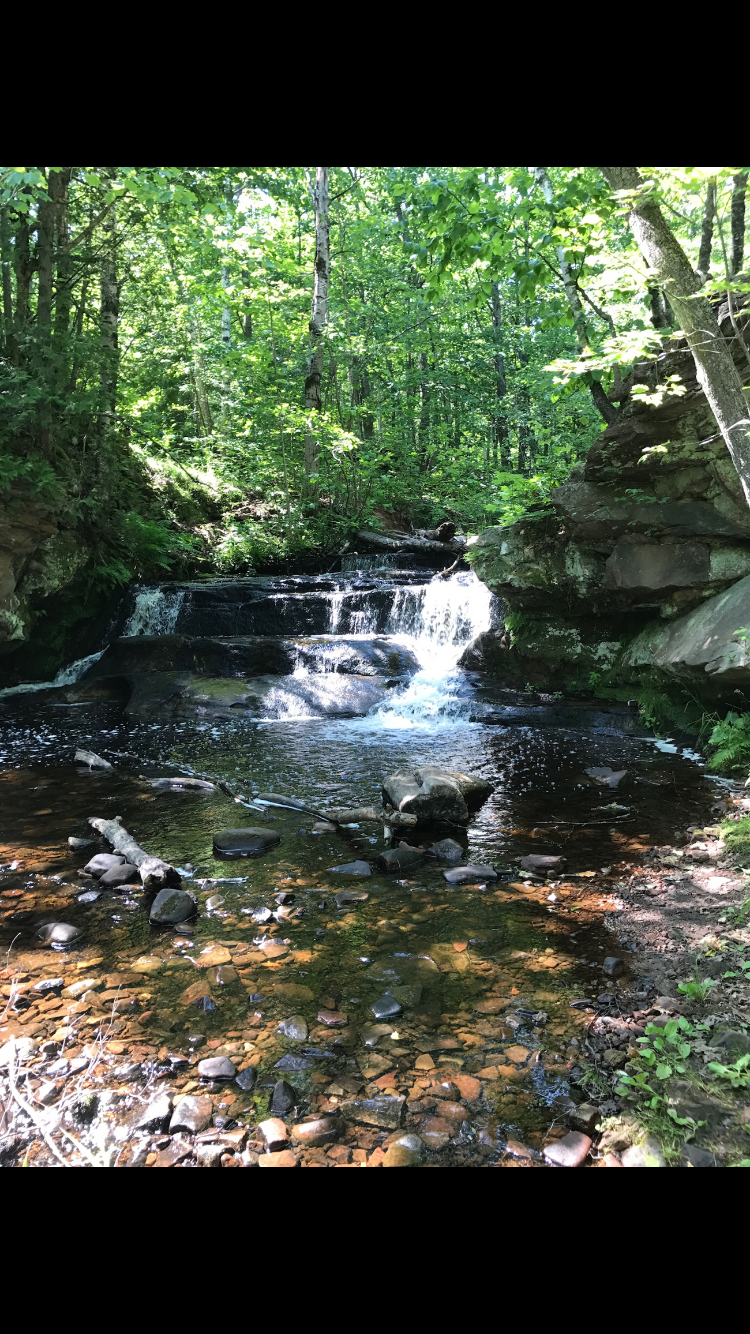
The upper falls.

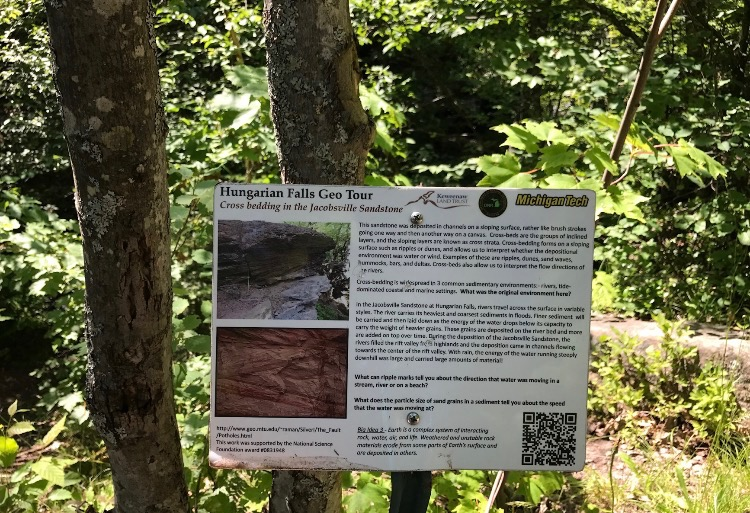
Sign Marker at Hungarian Falls describing the Jacobsville Sandstone in the area.

== See also ==
- List of waterfalls
