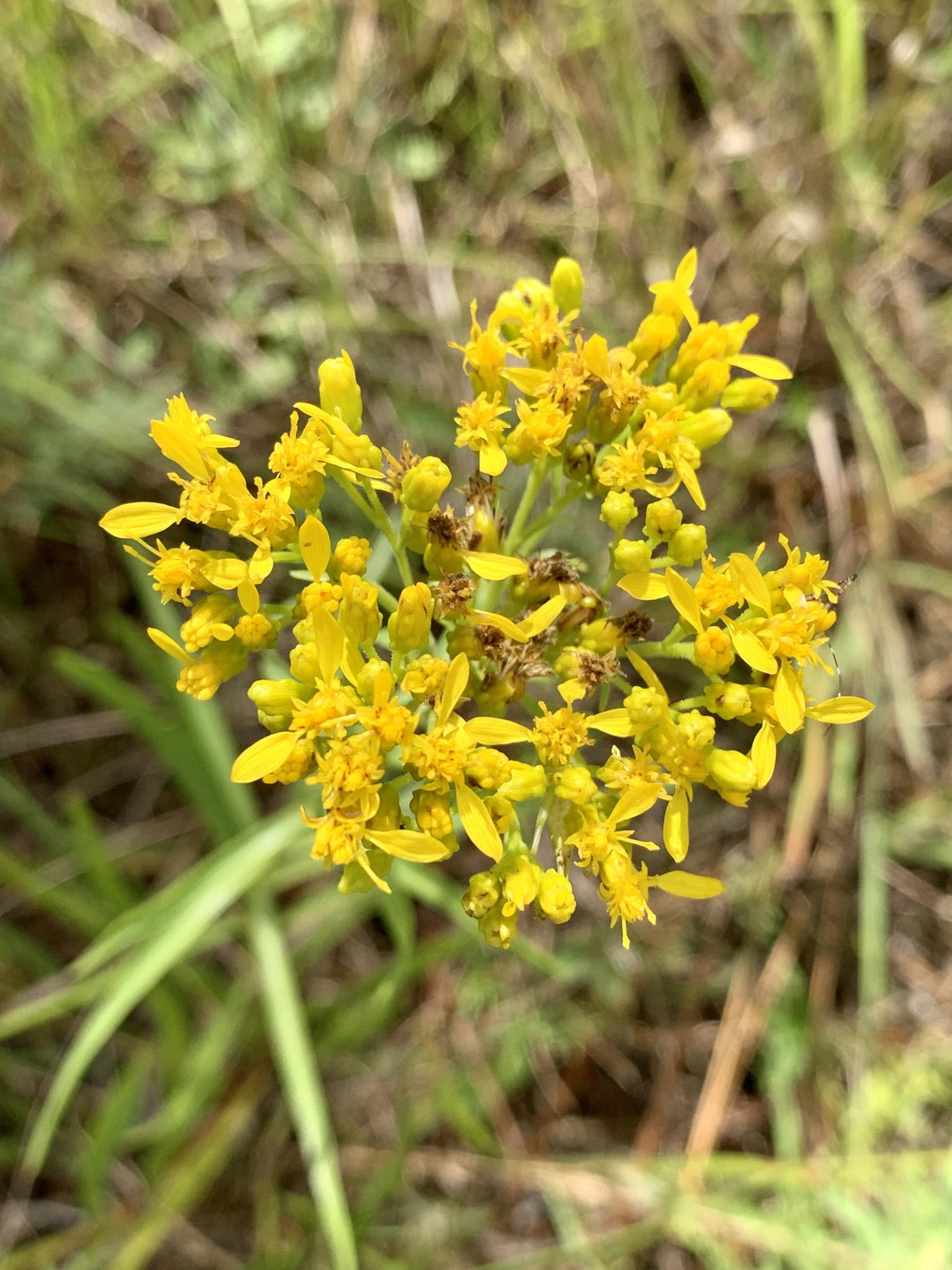

Scientific classification
- Kingdom: Plantae
- Clade: Tracheophytes
- Clade: Angiosperms
- Clade: Eudicots
- Clade: Asterids
- Order: Asterales
- Family: Asteraceae
- Genus: Solidago
- Section: S. sect. Ptarmicoidei
- Species: S. nitida

Binomial name
- Solidago nitida Torr. & A.Gray 1842

Synonyms
- Oligoneuron nitidum (Torr. & A.Gray) Small

= Solidago nitida =

Species of flowering plant

Solidago nitida is a North American plant species in the family Asteraceae, common name shiny goldenrod. The species is native to the south-central United States, in the southern Great Plains and Lower Mississippi Valley. It is found in the states of Oklahoma, Texas, Louisiana, Arkansas, and Mississippi.

Solidago nitida is a perennial herb up to 100 cm (40 inches) tall. Leaves are hairless and shiny, found both at the base of the plant and higher up on the stem. One plant can produce as many as 100 small yellow flower heads in a compact, flat-topped array.
