= Michigan Geological Survey =

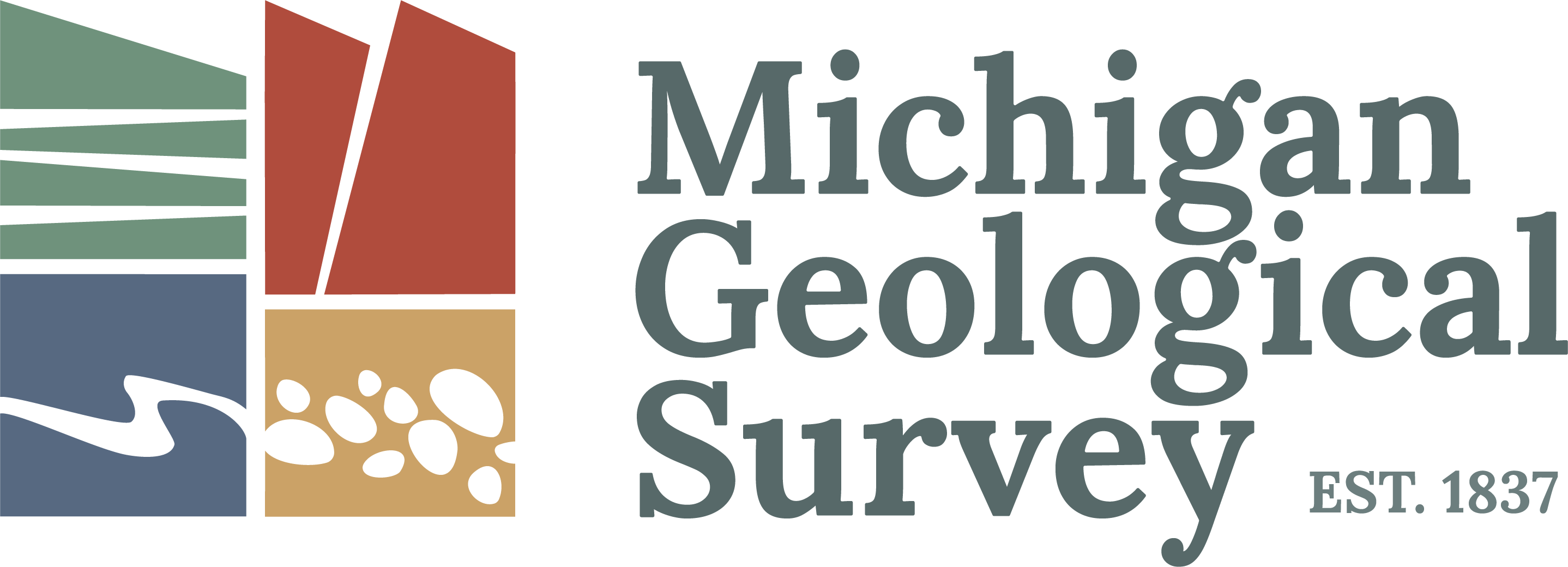
- Abbreviation: MGS
- Formation: 1837
- Region served: Michigan
- Website: mgs.wmich.edu

The Michigan Geological Survey is a scientific agency of the U.S. state of Michigan. The survey is headed by the State Geologist of Michigan.

The survey has been composed of three individual surveys: the first from 1837 through 1845, the second from 1859 through 1862, and the third from 1869 to present. During most of that time, the survey has been a department of the state government. Since 2011, however, the survey has been administered by the Department of Geosciences at Western Michigan University.

== History ==
=== First and second geological surveys ===
An act to provide for a geological survey of the state

SECTION 1. Be it enacted by the Senate and House of Representatives of the State of Michigan, That the governor is hereby authorized and directed to nominate, and by and with the advice and consent of the senate, to appoint a competent person, whose duty it shall be to make an accurate and complete geological survey of this State, which shall be accompanied with proper maps and diagrams, and furnish a full and scientific description of its rocks, soils, minerals, and of its botanical and geological productions, together with specimens of the same; which maps, diagrams, and specimens shall be deposited in the State library, and similar specimens shall be deposited in such literary and scientific institutions as the governor shall direct; and the governor is further authorized to appoint, from time to time, as the exigencies of the case may require, competent persons to act as assistants under the directions of the geologist.

SECTION 2. A sum not exceeding $3,000 for the year 1837, a sum not exceeding $6,000 for the year 1838, a sum not exceeding $8,000 for the year 1839, and a sum not exceeding $12,000 for the year 1840, is hereby appropriated to defray the expenses that may be incurred under this act, which sums shall be paid out of the treasury from any money not otherwise appropriated, at such times and in such sums as the governor may direct; and an account of all the expenditures of each year shall be annually reported to the legislature.

SECTION 3. The geologist appointed under the provisions of this act shall make a report annually to the legislature, on the first Monday of January, in each year, setting forth generally the progress made in the survey hereby authorized.

Approved February 23, 1837.

On January 26, 1837, Michigan was admitted as a state. On that same day, a bill was introduced and approved in the state legislature to conduct a geological survey of Michigan. Dr. Douglass Houghton, who created and planned the survey, convinced legislators to approve its creation and funding. The bill, titled "An act to provide for a geological survey of the state", was signed into law by Governor Stevens T. Mason on February 23, commencing the state's first geological survey. Owing to his effort in creating the survey, Houghton was named the first State Geologist. Abram Sager was appointed as Houghton's assistant for the zoological and botanical aspects of the survey. The survey was appropriated $3000 for its first year. The motivational factor for establishing a geological survey was primarily to secure supplies of salt. Lesser reasons were to help dispel negative beliefs about the state and to investigate copper resources in the Upper Peninsula. As established, the survey was expected to be completed in four years; however, it was soon realized that a proper survey of the entire state would take much longer.

In March 1838, the survey was divided into four departments: geological and mineralogical, zoological, botanical, and topographical. Each department was headed by a specialist under the direction of the State Geologist. In 1840, the botanical and zoological aspects of the survey were abolished by the legislature. They were perceived as offering the state little benefit, overriding Houghton's protests that they remain. In 1845, Houghton was out sailing on Lake Superior when a storm overturned his boat and he drowned. After this incident the survey was suspended, although Houghton's assistant and another surveyor continued to map the mineralogical deposits on the south shore of Lake Superior.

In the late 1850s, the Michigan Legislature received petitions from various interests to further investigate the state's salt resources, leading to the establishment of a second geological survey on February 15, 1859. Dr. Alexander Winchell of the University of Michigan was named State Geologist on March 9. Winchell spent much of his time from 1859 through 1862 conducting field work that culminated in a single comprehensive report. His report included a general description of the state's geology and more detailed descriptions of some of its mineral resources of economic interest, including coal, gypsum, and salt in the Lower Peninsula, and iron in the Upper Peninsula. In 1863 the legislature did not approve further funding for the survey, as the state treasury was dedicated to funding the American Civil War. Official termination of the survey occurred on March 7, 1863, by a joint resolution of the state legislature.

=== Third geological survey ===
==== 1869 to 1920 ====
By 1869 there was widespread public support for resuming the geological survey, and legislation was passed in March. The survey was officially known as the Michigan Geological and Biological Survey. An ex officio Board of Geological Survey was created to oversee the department, consisting of the Governor, Superintendent of Public Instruction, and President of the State Board of Education. Unlike the previous two surveys, botanical and zoological investigations were not included. On April 24, Winchell was reappointed as State Geologist. This time Winchell's ideas for the direction of the survey were in conflict with those of the board. Winchell wanted to concentrate on a scholarly investigation of the Lower Peninsula, but the Board wanted the survey to focus on copper and iron resources in the Upper Peninsula. In response, the Board contracted independent surveys of the Marquette Iron Range and the Copper Country. As a result of frequent debates and political infighting, Winchell resigned in April 1871.

Dr. Carl Rominger was named as Winchell's replacement. Rominger worked "practically alone" from 1872 through 1876, focusing primarily on investigating fossil corals and elucidating the geologic structure of the Michigan Basin in the Lower Peninsula. He also supported the independent contractors who were investigating economic resources in the Upper Peninsula. In May 1885, Charles E. Wright, who had previously been the state's Commissioner of Mineral Statistics, succeeded Rominger. He primarily engaged in the drawing of topographical maps and sketches of the geologic phenomena of the Upper Peninsula. After Wright's death in March 1888, Marshman Edward Wadsworth was appointed as State Geologist. Under Wadsworth, the survey obtained its own offices at the Michigan Mining School, having previously relied on private offices or the homes of the various geologists. In order that the Michigan Geological Survey could concentrate on economic geology, Wadsworth arranged for the United States Geological Survey to assume responsibility for studies of paleontology and other non-economic scientific topics.

The Board of 1891 to 1892 recommended to the legislature a number of changes. These included incorporating the office of Mineral Statistics with the survey, appropriating offices in Lansing, and hiring geologists who were independent of state universities and who could dedicate the whole of their time to the survey. In 1893, Wadsworth became aware of these intentions, and offered to resign from the Michigan Mining School if he were given a raise to $4,000 per year. His offer was rejected and Wadsworth resigned.

Dr. Lucius Lee Hubbard was appointed State Geologist on July 1, 1893, with Dr. Alfred Church Lane as Assistant State Geologist. The research results published by these two men, documenting the copper deposits in the Upper Peninsula, salt and gypsum deposits, and petroleum resources in the Upper Peninsula, became noted reference tools for future geologists. During Hubbard's tenure the survey terminated its remaining connections with the Michigan Mining School and the University of Michigan, as the relationship was considered "beneficial to [the universities], but detrimental to the survey". Hubbard resigned in 1899, and Lane became State Geologist in April. Lane moved the survey's headquarters from Houghton to Lansing. During his tenure, the legislature reinstated funding for zoological and biological studies, and the first topographical survey was commenced. In 1909, Lane resigned to accept a professorship at Tufts College, and was succeeded by Roland C. Allen in September.

Around the time that Allen became State Geologist, the survey took over the responsibilities of the Commissioner of Mineral Statistics, including preparing reports on the state's metallic and non-metallic minerals and conducting annual assessments of iron mines. The survey significantly reduced its activities during World War I due to a lack of funding and workers, but continued its topographical research, resulting in the relocation and marking of the Ohio-Michigan border. In 1919, Allen resigned and his assistant, Richard A. Smith, became State Geologist. In 1920, responsibility for the survey was transferred to the newly created Michigan Department of Conservation. However, the topographical elements of the survey were transferred to other state departments.

==== 1920 to present ====
In 1946 Smith retired, after 26 years as the longest-serving State Geologist to date. Dr. Gerald E. Eddy succeeded Smith, and remained until 1951. He was followed by Franklin G. Pardee from 1951 through 1952. William L. Daoust succeeded him as Acting State Geologist through 1954 and as State Geologist through 1964. After twelve years as the Department of Conservation's Director, Eddy was reappointed State Geologist in 1964. In 1968, the Michigan Department of Natural Resources was created, to which the survey was transferred, retaining its name as the Geological Survey Division.

Eddy was succeeded by Arthur E. Slaughter in 1971. R. Thomas Segall followed in 1981, serving until 1996. In 1995, the Michigan Department of Environmental Quality was created, taking over the survey. In 1996, Harold R. Fitch became State Geologist. In 2002 and 2004, the survey was respectively renamed the Geological and Land Management Division and the Office of Geological Survey.

In 2010, Fitch began discussions with Western Michigan University (WMU) to assume the non-regulatory functions of the survey. Funding cuts were restricting the survey's ability to perform any non-regulatory duties, so a transfer to a different institution would permit their accomplishment. In October 2011, the survey was transferred to Western Michigan University's Department of Geosciences. WMU professor Alan E. Kehew was then appointed director of the survey. In 2013, John A. Yellich was appointed director of the survey. In 2024, Sara Pearson was appointed director of the survey.

== List of State Geologists ==
Portrait	Name	Post	Took office	Left office	Division	Ref(s)
	Douglass Houghton	State Geologist	1837	1845 (death)	First Geological Survey	
Office suspended (1845–1859)
	Alexander Winchell	State Geologist	March 9, 1859	1862	Second Geological Survey	
Office suspended (1862–1869)
	Alexander Winchell	State Geologist	April 24, 1869	April 17, 1871	Third Geological Survey; Michigan Geological and Biological Survey	
	Carl Rominger	State Geologist	1871	1885	Third Geological Survey; Michigan Geological and Biological Survey	
	Charles E. Wright	State Geologist	1885	1888 (death)	Third Geological Survey; Michigan Geological and Biological Survey	
	Marshman E. Wadsworth	State Geologist	1888	1893	Third Geological Survey; Michigan Geological and Biological Survey	
	Lucius L. Hubbard	State Geologist	July 3, 1893	1899	Third Geological Survey; Michigan Geological and Biological Survey	
	Alfred Church Lane	State Geologist	1899	1909	Third Geological Survey; Michigan Geological and Biological Survey	
	Roland C. Allen	State Geologist	1909	1919	Third Geological Survey; Michigan Geological and Biological Survey	
	Richard A. Smith	State Geologist	1919	1920	Third Geological Survey; Michigan Geological and Biological Survey	
	Richard A. Smith	Division Chief and State Geologist	1920	1946	Third Geological Survey; Geological Survey Division, Department of Conservation	
	Gerald E. Eddy	Division Chief and State Geologist	1946	1951	Third Geological Survey; Geological Survey Division, Department of Conservation	
	Franklin G. Pardee	Division Chief and State Geologist	1951	1952	Third Geological Survey; Geological Survey Division, Department of Conservation	
	William L. Daoust	Acting State Geologist	1952	1954	Third Geological Survey; Geological Survey Division, Department of Conservation	
	William L. Daoust	Division Chief and State Geologist	1954	1964	Third Geological Survey; Geological Survey Division, Department of Conservation	
	Gerald E. Eddy	State Geologist	1964	1971	Third Geological Survey; Geological Survey Division, Department of Natural Resources	
	Arthur E. Slaughter	State Geologist	1971	1976	Third Geological Survey; Geological Survey Division, Department of Natural Resources	
	Arthur E. Slaughter	State Geologist	1976	1977	Third Geological Survey; Division of Geology, Department of Natural Resources	
	Arthur E. Slaughter	State Geologist	1977	1981	Third Geological Survey; Geological Survey Division, Department of Natural Resources	
	R. Thomas Segall	State Geologist	1981	1996	Third Geological Survey; Geological Survey Division, Department of Natural Resources	
	Harold R. Fitch	State Geologist	1996	2002	Third Geological Survey; Geological Survey Division, Department of Environmental Quality	
	Harold R. Fitch	State Geologist	2002	2004	Third Geological Survey; Geological and Land Management Division, Department of Environmental Quality	
	Harold R. Fitch	State Geologist	2004	2011	Third Geological Survey; Office of Geological Survey, Department of Environmental Quality	
	Alan E. Kehew	Director	2011	2013	Third Geological Survey; WMU Department of Geosciences	
	John A. Yellich	Director	2013	2024	Third Geological Survey; WMU Department of Geosciences	
	Sara Pearson	Director	2024	—	Third Geological Survey; WMU Department of Geosciences	
