= Marshman Edward Wadsworth =

Marshman E. Wadsworth
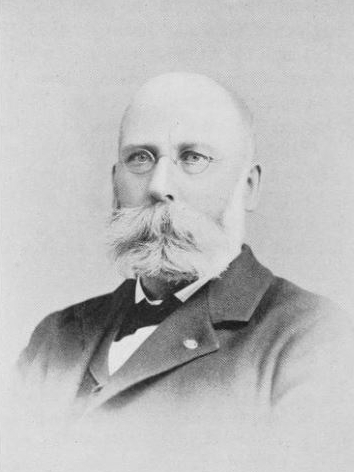
- M. E. Wadsworth
- Born: May 6, 1847; East Livermore, Maine
- Died: April 21, 1921 (aged 73); Pittsburgh

Marshman Edward Wadsworth (May 6, 1847 – April 21, 1921) was an American geologist and educator. He served as the first president of Michigan Technological University and was State Geologist of Michigan from 1888 through 1893.

== Biography ==
Wadsworth was born on May 6, 1847, in East Livermore, Maine, and spent on his childhood on the family farm. He enrolled at Bowdoin College in 1865 and graduated in 1869, after which he taught for four years in Minnesota and Wisconsin. In 1872, he received his Master of Arts from Bowdoin. In 1873, he was elected Professor of Chemistry at Boston Dental College and he enrolled at Harvard University for graduate studies. He resigned from Boston Dental College in 1874 and became an instructor of mathematics and mineralogy at Harvard. Wadsworth received a Master of Arts in 1874 from Harvard, and over the summer of 1874, he worked on a geological survey of New Hampshire. Wadsworth resigned from his instructorship in 1877 and earned his Ph.D. in 1879 from Harvard.

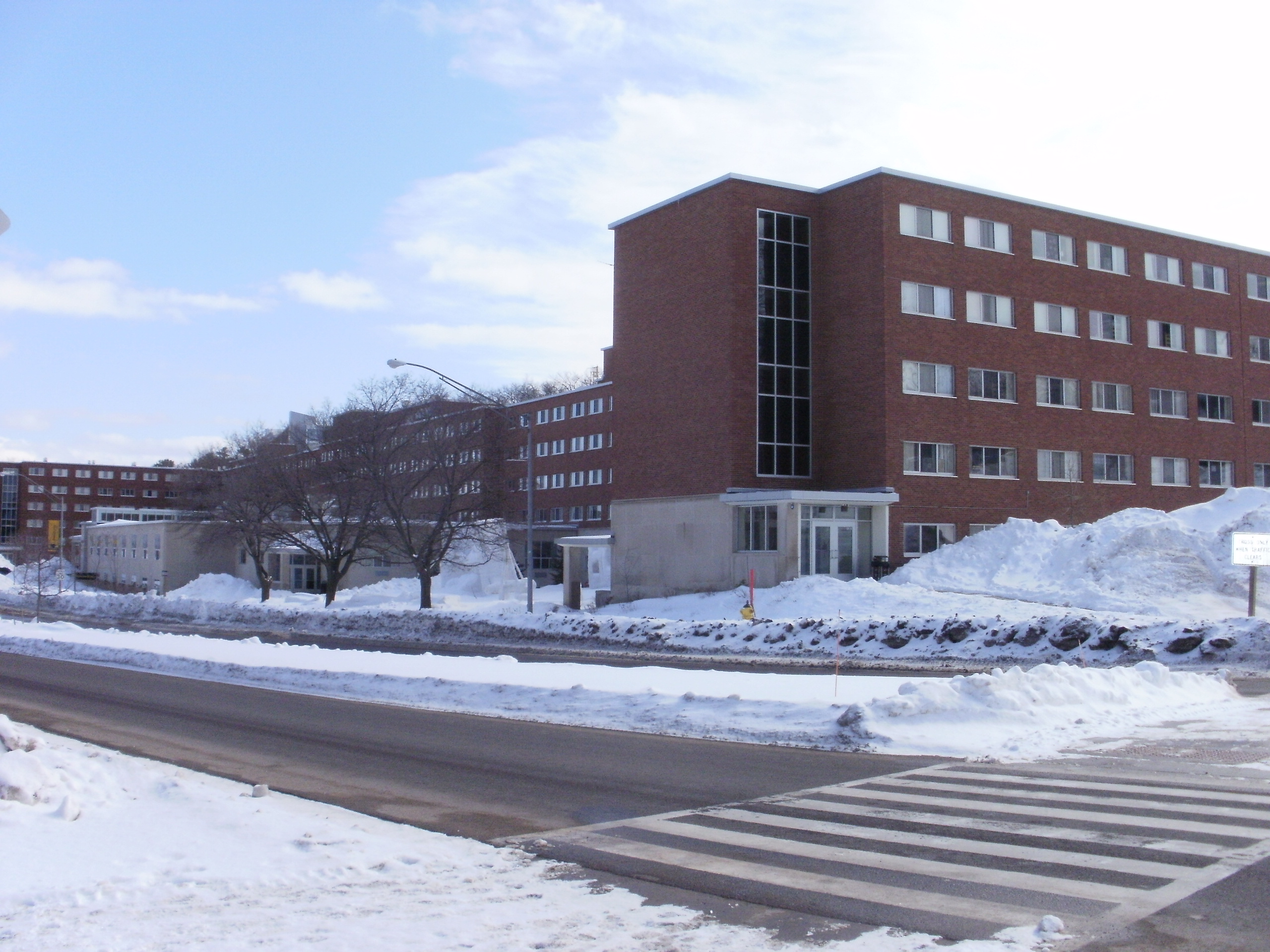
Wadsworth Hall in 2012

In 1885, Wadsworth was elected Professor of Mineralogy and Geology at Colby University which he held for two years. From 1886 to 1887, he worked as assistant geologist for the Minnesota Geological Survey. Wadsworth served as the first president of Michigan Technological University (then the Michigan Mining School) from 1887 through 1898. (Note: Contemporary sources refer to him as the school's director) Wadsworth Hall, one of the residence halls on Michigan Tech's campus, was named in his honor.

Wadsworth was appointed State Geologist of Michigan in May 1888 following the death of State Geologist Charles E. Wright in March. Arrangements were made so that Wadsworth could continue as president while serving as State Geologist. During his tenure, Wadsworth worked to better organize the Michigan Geological Survey. He secured official offices for the survey, as previously the only offices were private or in the homes of geologists. The supervisory Board of Geological Survey of 1891 to 1892 recommended changes to the survey, including hiring geologists who were independent of state universities and who could dedicate the whole of their time to the survey. In 1893, Wadsworth became aware of these intentions, and offered to resign from the Michigan Mining School if he were given a raise to $4000 per year. His offer was rejected and Wadsworth resigned.

In 1895, Wadsworth devised and instituted an extensive system of elective courses for the Michigan Mining School, a first for an engineering school in the United States. According to Wadsworth, despite the popularity and effectiveness of an elective system in other fields of study, a fixed system was very common for engineering and technical education.

Wadsworth was a Fellow of the Geological Society of London and a member of the Geological Society of America, American Society of Naturalists, American Institute of Mining Engineers, and the Boston Society of Natural History.

He died on April 21, 1921, at his home in Pittsburgh.

== Publications ==
- Wadsworth, M. E. (October 1884). "Lithological studies: a description and classification of the rocks of the Cordilleras". Memoirs of the Museum of Comparative Zoology. 11.
- Wadsworth, M. E. (1896). "The elective system in technological schools". Proceedings of the Society for the Promotion of Engineering Education.
- Wadsworth, M. E. (July 1897). "The origin and mode of occurrence of the Lake Superior copper-deposits". Transactions of the American Institute of Mining Engineers.
- Wadsworth, M. E. (1909). Crystallography: an elementary manual for the laboratory. John Joseph McVey.

== Footnotes ==
=== References ===
- Allen, R. C.; Martin, Helen M. (1922). "A brief history of the Geological and Biological Survey of Michigan; 1837 to 1872, by R. C. Allen; 1872 to 1920, by Helen M. Martin" (PDF). Michigan History Magazine. 6 (44). Michigan Historical Commission. Archived (PDF) from the original on November 30, 2012.
- Pattengill, Henry R. (1895). Fifty-Ninth Annual Report of the Superintendent of Public Instruction of the State of Michigan (Report). pp. 104–105.
- Segall, R. Thomas (1980s). "A Brief History of the Michigan Geological Survey" (PDF). Michigan Geological Survey, Department of Natural Resources.

Academic offices
Preceded by —	President of Michigan Technological University; 1887 – 1898	Succeeded by Fred W. McNair
