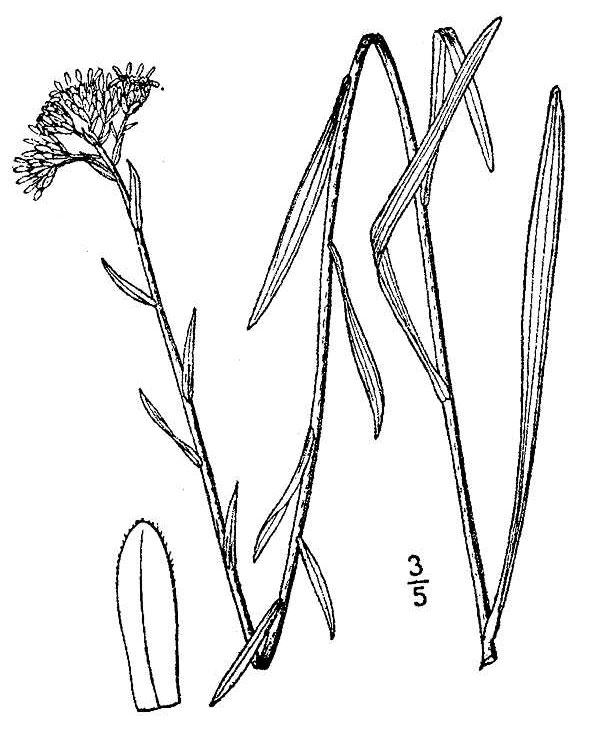
- 1913 illustration

Conservation status
- Vulnerable (NatureServe)

Scientific classification
- Kingdom: Plantae
- Clade: Tracheophytes
- Clade: Angiosperms
- Clade: Eudicots
- Clade: Asterids
- Order: Asterales
- Family: Asteraceae
- Genus: Solidago
- Section: S. sect. Ptarmicoidei
- Species: S. houghtonii

Binomial name
- Solidago houghtonii Torr. & A.Gray ex A.Gray

Synonyms
- Aster houghtonii (Torr. & A.Gray) Kuntze; Oligoneuron houghtonii (Torr. & A.Gray) G.L.Nesom

= Solidago houghtonii =

Species of flowering plant

Solidago houghtonii is a rare North American species of flowering plant in the family Asteraceae known as Houghton's goldenrod. It is native to southern Ontario, Canada and the northern United States (Michigan and New York). It is threatened by the loss and degradation of its habitat. It is a federally listed threatened species of the United States and it is designated a species of special concern by Canada's Committee on the Status of Endangered Wildlife in Canada.

== Description ==
Solidago houghtonii is a perennial herb producing one or more erect stems up to 60 centimeters (2 feet) tall or more from a branching caudex covered with the remains of previous seasons' leaves. The leaves near the base of the plant are oval in shape and those higher on the stem are linear or lance-shaped and up to 17 or 18 centimeters (6.8-7.2 inches) in length. The inflorescence is an array of many flower heads each up to a centimeter long. The head contains 6 to 12 yellow ray florets surrounding several disc florets. The fruit is about half a centimeter (0.2 inches) long including the pappus of bristles at the tip. Blooming occurs in August.

== Taxonomy ==
Houghton's goldenrod was originally described by John Torrey and Asa Gray in 1848 as Solidago houghtonii. In 1993, Guy Nesom transferred it to the genus of flat-topped goldenrods, Oligoneuron. This goldenrod is now treated by some sources as Oligoneuron houghtonii and by others as Solidago houghtonii, within the section Solidago sect. Ptarmicoidei.

The name honors Douglass Houghton (1809–1845), a doctor, botanist, geologist, and civic leader who discovered this species in 1839 in Mackinac County, Michigan, on the shores of Lake Michigan.

== Distribution and habitat ==
Solidago houghtonii grows on the shores of the Great Lakes, mainly Lake Huron and Lake Michigan, near the Michigan-Ontario border at Sault Ste. Marie. It grows in sandy lakeshore habitat types as well as moist limestone alvars. The habitat is sometimes submerged but the plants return when water levels drop. It also occurs in bog habitat.

== Conservation ==
Houghton's goldenrod is threatened by the loss, degradation, and fragmentation of its habitat during development and construction. Any disturbance of the dunes among which the plant grows can be harmful. The use of off-road vehicles in the habitat is detrimental, and the installation of walls, roads, and other structures affects the dunes. Maintenance activities such as herbicide application, mowing, and road salting are threats, as is beach recreation. Since 1975 about 20% of the populations of this plant have been eliminated.
