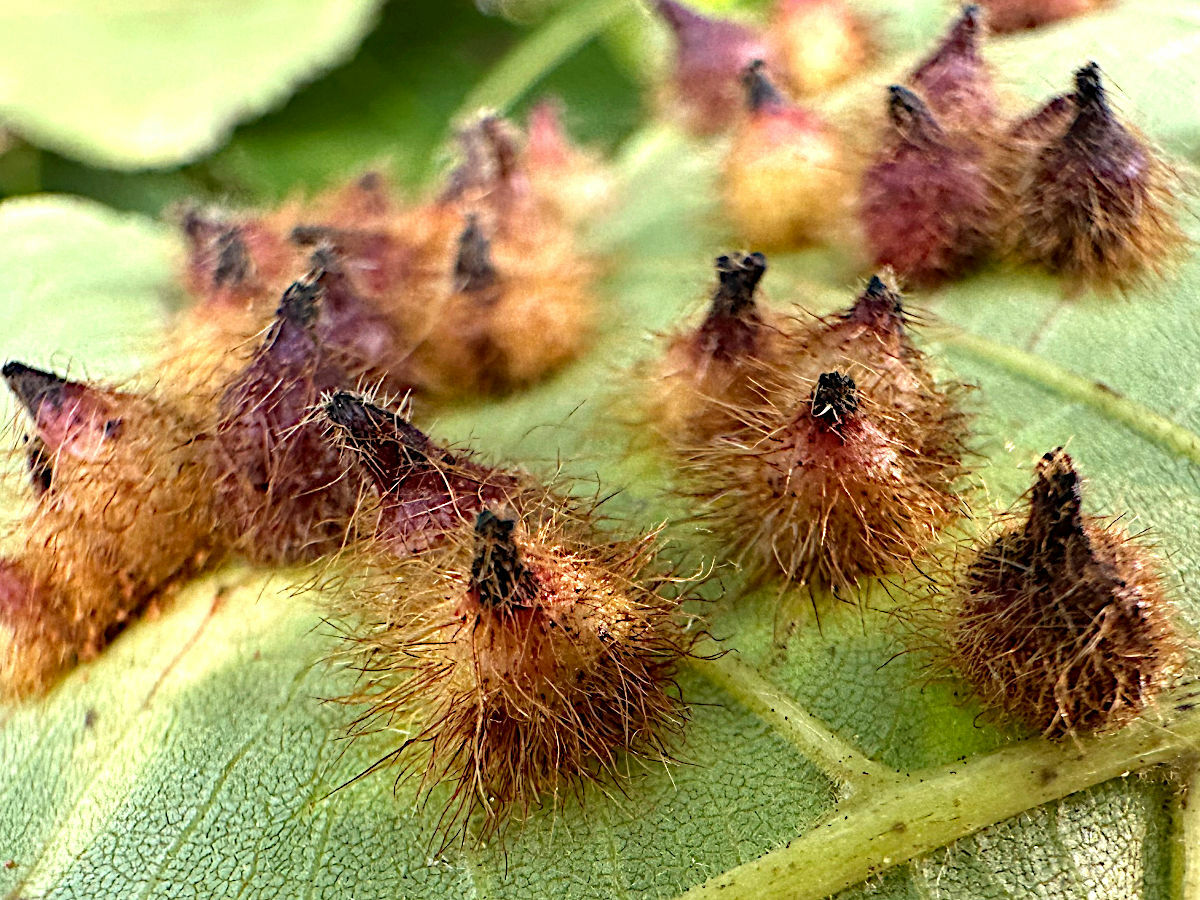
- Leaf galls, underside
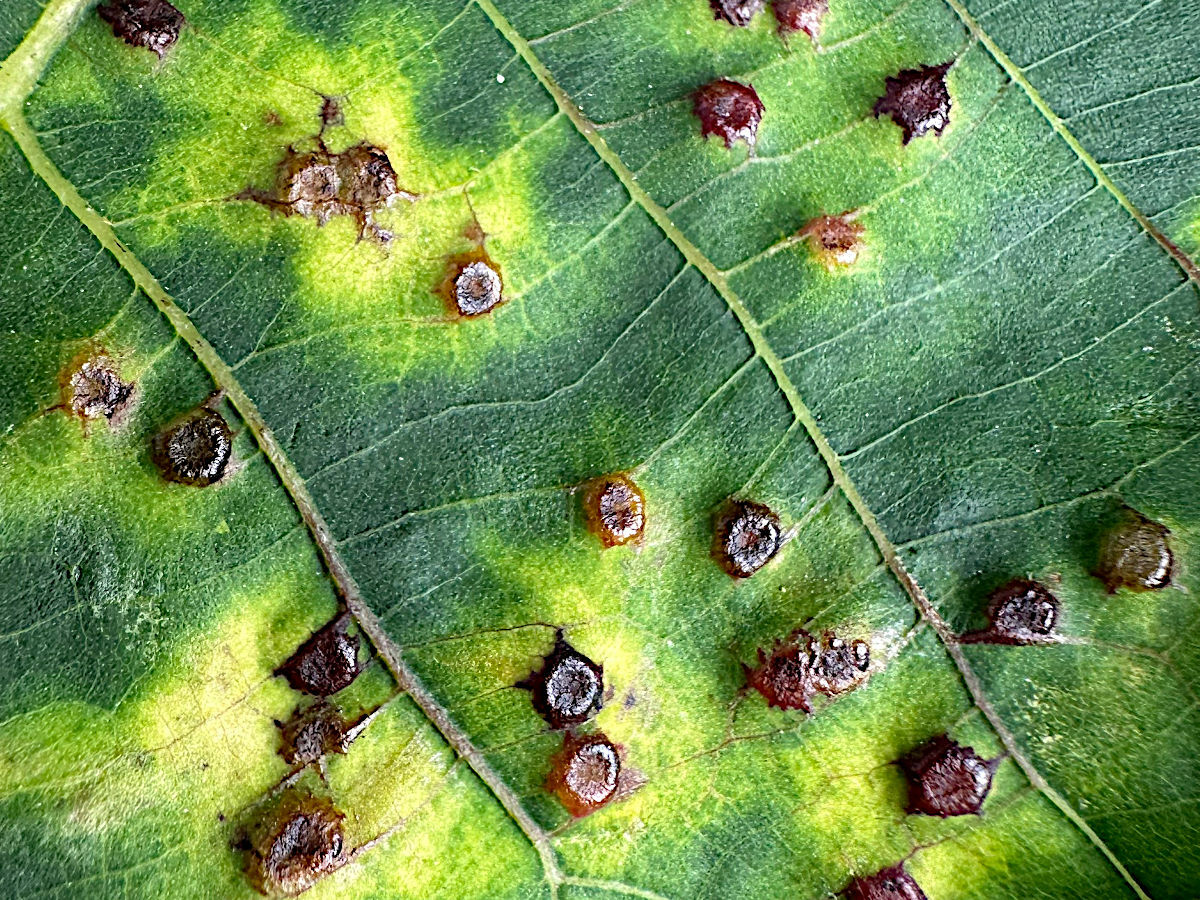
- Leaf galls, upperside

Scientific classification
- Domain: Eukaryota
- Kingdom: Animalia
- Phylum: Arthropoda
- Class: Insecta
- Order: Diptera
- Family: Cecidomyiidae
- Genus: Caryomyia
- Species: C. echinata

Binomial name
- Caryomyia echinata Gagne, 2008

= Caryomyia echinata =

Species of fly

Caryomyia echinata, the hickory spiny gall midge, is a species of gall midge in the family Cecidomyiidae, occurring in Eastern North America.

== Etymology ==
"The name echinata is a Latin adjective meaning spiny, with reference to the long, stiff hairs covering the gall."

== Ecology ==
Larvae induce galls on the leaves of hickory trees, including Carya laciniosa, Carya ovata, Carya pallida, Carya texana, and Carya tomentosa. Pupae emerge in late summer through the side of the gall near the base.

"This gall is the only woody Caryomyia gall that is covered with very long, stiff hairs and occurs between instead of on veins."
