= Trama =

Trama may refer to:

- Trama (aphid), a genus of aphids
- Trama, a genus of moths, synonym of Lesmone
- Trama (mycology), a mushroom's "flesh"
