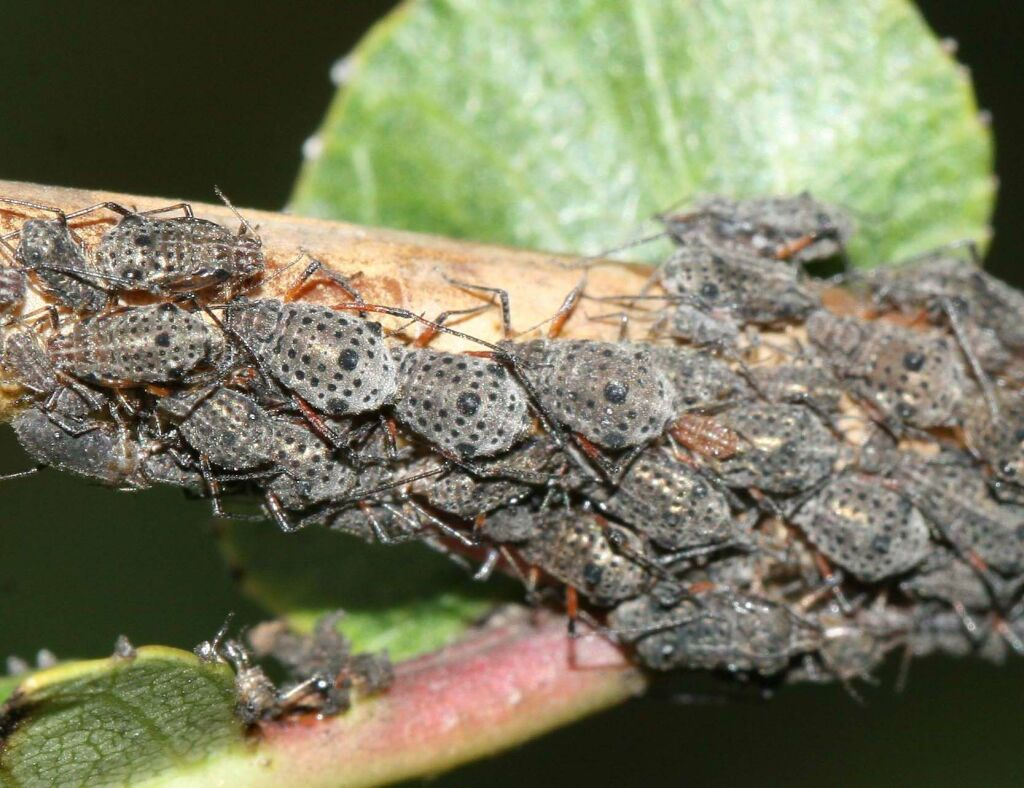
- Cinara sp.

Scientific classification
- Kingdom: Animalia
- Phylum: Arthropoda
- Clade: Pancrustacea
- Class: Insecta
- Order: Hemiptera
- Suborder: Sternorrhyncha
- Family: Aphididae
- Subfamily: Lachninae; Herrich-Schaeffer, 1854

= Lachninae =

Subfamily of insects

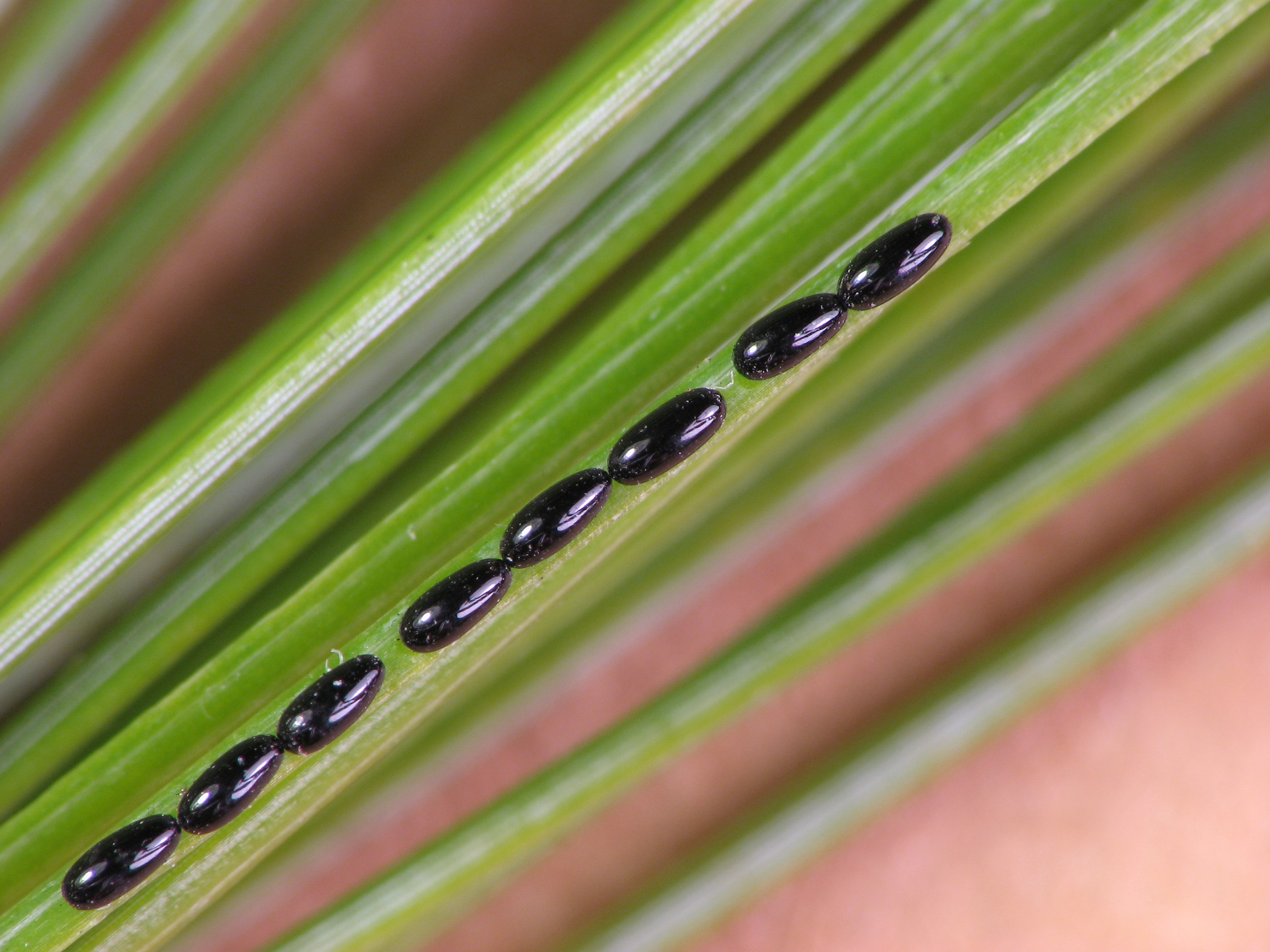
Eggs of Cinara strobi on pine needles

Lachninae is a subfamily of the family Aphididae, containing some of the largest aphids, and they are sometimes referred to as "giant aphids". Members of this subfamily typically have greatly reduced cornicles compared to other aphids, and the group has sometimes been classified as a separate family.

== Genera ==
- Cinara Curtis, 1835
- Essigella Del Guercio, 1909
- Eulachnus Del Guercio, 1909
- Pseudessigella Hille Ris Lambers, 1966
- Schizolachnus Mordvilko, 1909
- Lachnus Burmeister, 1835
- Longistigma Wilson, 1909
- Maculolachnus
- Neonippolachnus
- Nippolachnus Matsumura, 1917
- Pterochloroides Mordvilko, 1914
- Pyrolachnus Basu & Hille Ris Lambers, 1968
- Sinolachnus Hille Ris Lambers, 1956
- Stomaphis Walker, 1870
- Tuberolachnus Mordvilko, 1909
- Eotrama Hille Ris Lambers, 1969
- Protrama Baker, 1920
- Trama von Heyden, 1837
