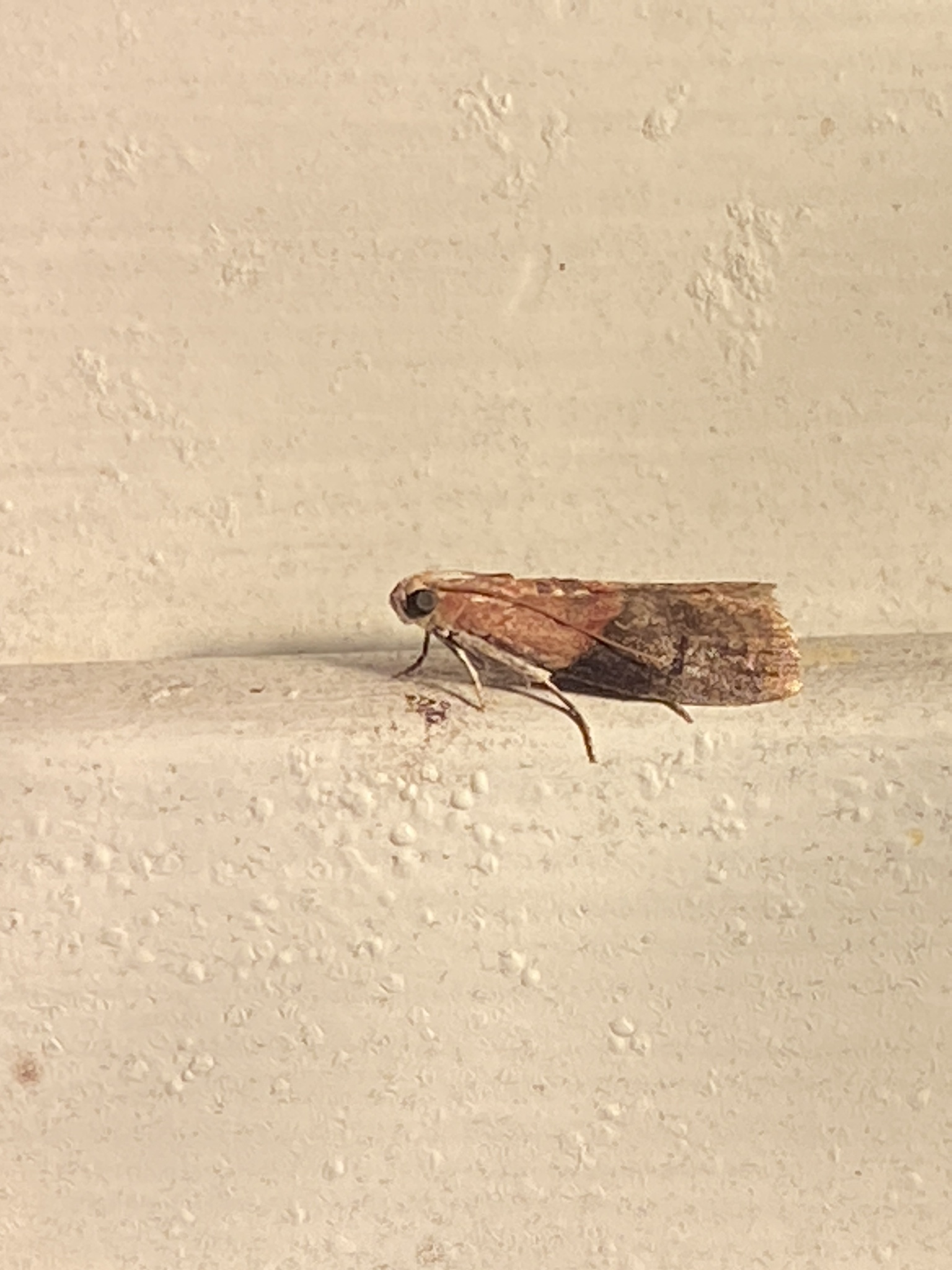

Scientific classification
- Kingdom: Animalia
- Phylum: Arthropoda
- Clade: Pancrustacea
- Class: Insecta
- Order: Lepidoptera
- Family: Pyralidae
- Genus: Acrobasis
- Species: A. caryalbella

Binomial name
- Acrobasis caryalbella Ely, 1913

= Acrobasis caryalbella =

Species of moth

Acrobasis caryalbella is a species of snout moth in the genus Acrobasis. It was described by Charles Russell Ely in 1913 and is known from the eastern United States.

There is one generation per year.

The larvae feed on Carya species, including Carya ovata, Carya tomentosa and Carya glabra. The species probably overwinters in the larval stage.
