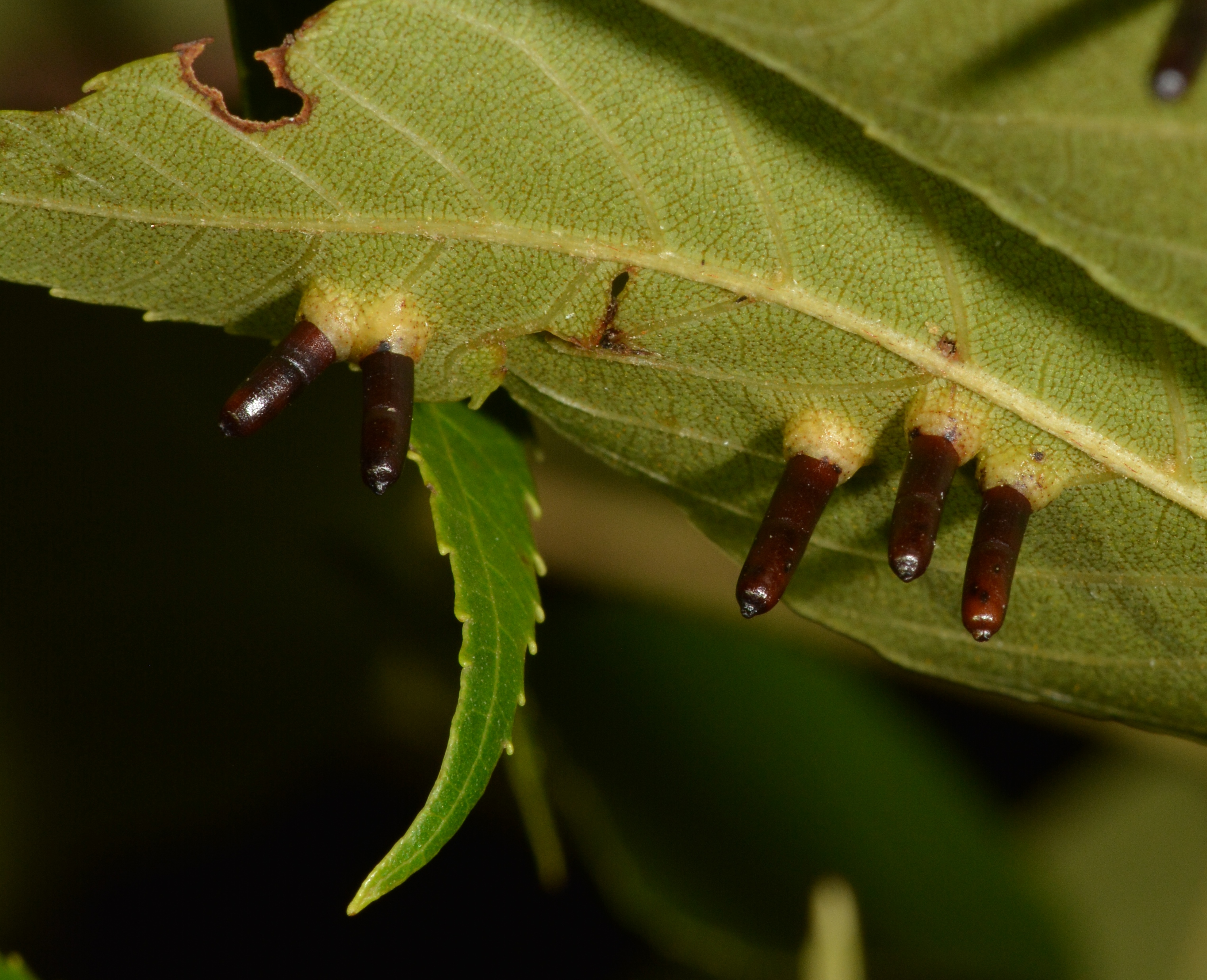
- Leaf galls caused by C. tubicola

Scientific classification
- Domain: Eukaryota
- Kingdom: Animalia
- Phylum: Arthropoda
- Class: Insecta
- Order: Diptera
- Family: Cecidomyiidae
- Supertribe: Cecidomyiidi
- Tribe: Cecidomyiini
- Genus: Caryomyia
- Species: C. tubicola

Binomial name
- Caryomyia tubicola (Osten Sacken, 1862)

Synonyms
- Cecidomyia tubicola Osten Sacken, 1862

= Caryomyia tubicola =

Species of fly

Caryomyia tubicola, the hickory bullet gall midge, is a species of gall midge in the family Cecidomyiidae.
