= Scobicia lesnei =

Scientific classification
- Domain: Eukaryota
- Kingdom: Animalia
- Phylum: Arthropoda
- Class: Insecta
- Order: Coleoptera
- Suborder: Polyphaga
- Family: Bostrichidae
- Tribe: Xyloperthini
- Genus: Scobicia
- Species: S. lesnei

Binomial name
- Scobicia lesnei Fisher, 1950

Species of beetle

Scobicia lesnei is a species of horned powder-post beetle in the family Bostrichidae. It is found in North America.
