= Caryomyia persicoides =

Scientific classification
- Domain: Eukaryota
- Kingdom: Animalia
- Phylum: Arthropoda
- Class: Insecta
- Order: Diptera
- Family: Cecidomyiidae
- Genus: Caryomyia
- Species: C. persicoides

Binomial name
- Caryomyia persicoides (Osten Sacken, 1862)

Synonyms
- Cecidomyia persicoides Osten Sacken, 1862

Species of fly

Caryomyia persicoides, the hickory peach-haired gall midge, is a species of gall midges in the family Cecidomyiidae.
