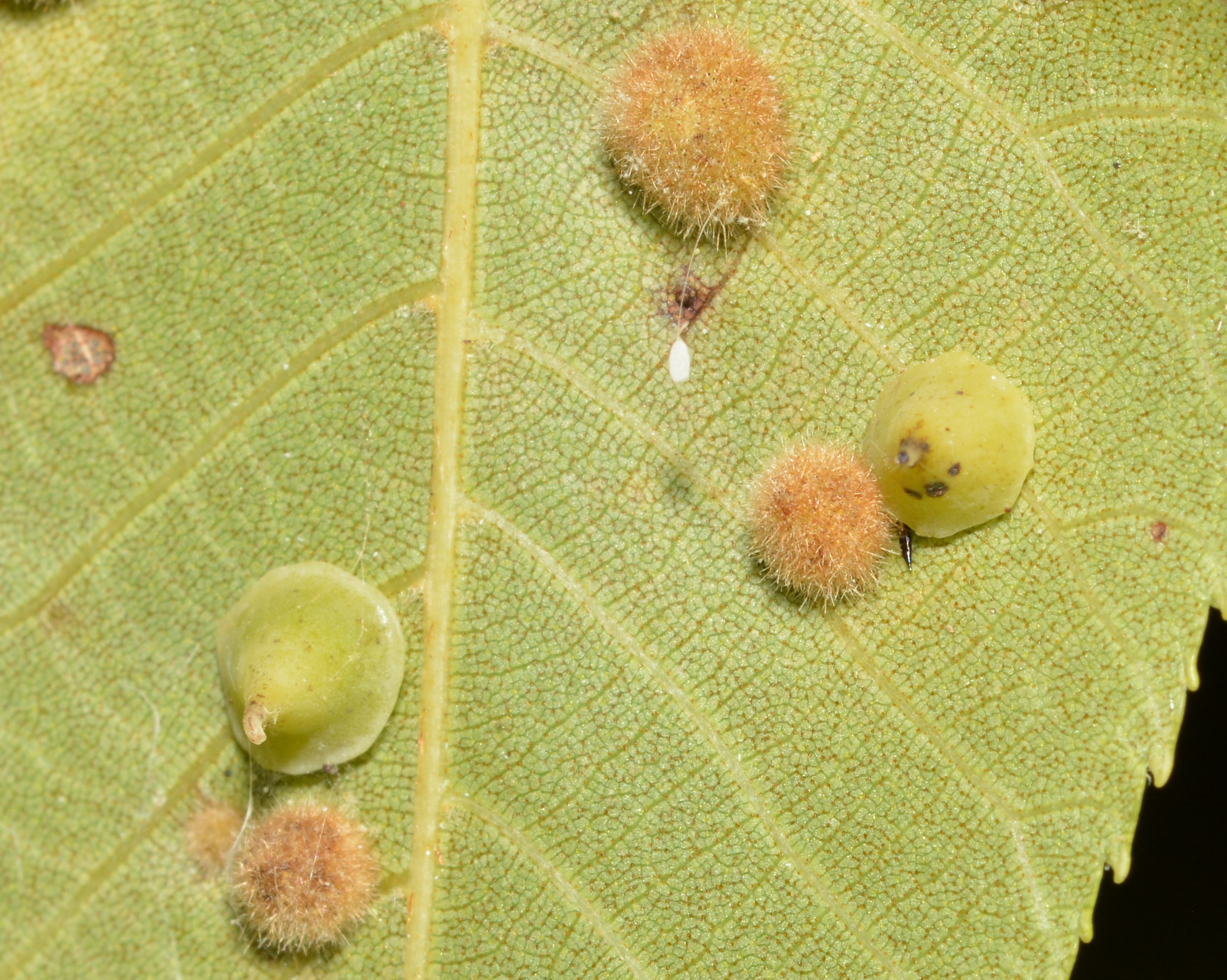
- Caryomyia sanguinolenta

Scientific classification
- Domain: Eukaryota
- Kingdom: Animalia
- Phylum: Arthropoda
- Class: Insecta
- Order: Diptera
- Family: Cecidomyiidae
- Genus: Caryomyia
- Species: C. sanguinolenta

Binomial name
- Caryomyia sanguinolenta (Osten Sacken, 1862)

Synonyms
- Cecidomyia sanguinolenta Osten Sacken, 1862

= Caryomyia sanguinolenta =

Species of fly

Caryomyia sanguinolenta, also known as hickory smooth gumdrop gall midge, is a species of gall midge in the family Cecidomyiidae.
