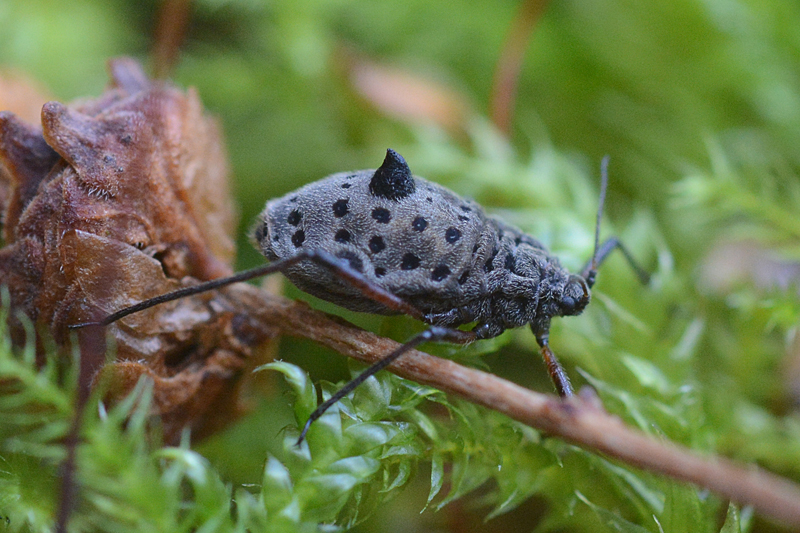
- Tuberolachnus salignus, showing dorsal tubercle

Scientific classification
- Domain: Eukaryota
- Kingdom: Animalia
- Phylum: Arthropoda
- Class: Insecta
- Order: Hemiptera
- Suborder: Sternorrhyncha
- Family: Aphididae
- Subfamily: Lachninae
- Tribe: Tuberolachnini
- Genus: Tuberolachnus; Mordvilko, 1909

= Tuberolachnus =

Genus of insects

Tuberolachnus is a genus of aphids.

Species:

- Tuberolachnus macrotuberculatus Yang, Qiao & Zhang, 2005
- Tuberolachnus salignus (Gmelin, 1790)
- Tuberolachnus scleratus Hille Ris Lambers & Basu, 1966
