= Caryomyia thompsoni =

Scientific classification
- Domain: Eukaryota
- Kingdom: Animalia
- Phylum: Arthropoda
- Class: Insecta
- Order: Diptera
- Family: Cecidomyiidae
- Genus: Caryomyia
- Species: C. thompsoni

Binomial name
- Caryomyia thompsoni (Felt, 1908)

Synonyms
- Hormomyia thompsoni Felt, 1908

Species of fly

Caryomyia thompsoni, the hickory placenta gall midge, is a species of gall midge in the family Cecidomyiidae.
