= Caryomyia caryae =

Scientific classification
- Domain: Eukaryota
- Kingdom: Animalia
- Phylum: Arthropoda
- Class: Insecta
- Order: Diptera
- Family: Cecidomyiidae
- Genus: Caryomyia
- Species: C. caryae

Binomial name
- Caryomyia caryae (Osten Sacken, 1862)

Synonyms
- Diplosis caryae Osten Sacken, 1862; Dirhiza caryae Felt, 1907

Species of fly

Caryomyia caryae, (the hickory sticky globe gall midge), is a species of gall midge in the family Cecidomyiidae. It forms a small, globular gall with a pointed tip on the undersides of Hickory leaves.
