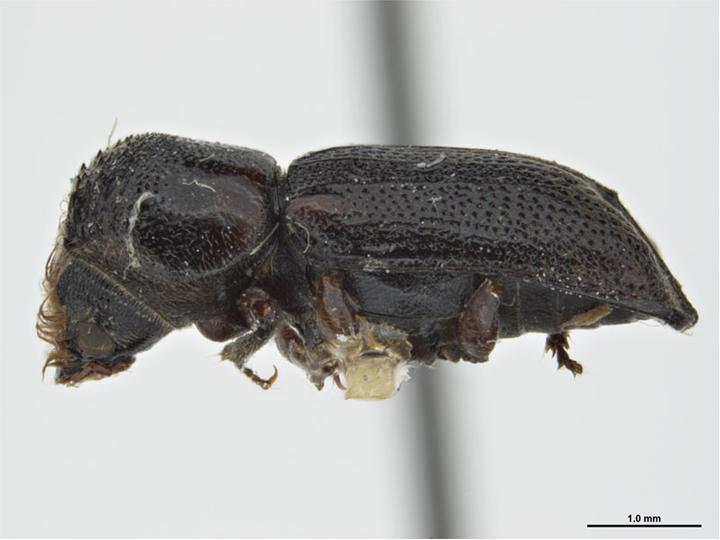

Scientific classification
- Domain: Eukaryota
- Kingdom: Animalia
- Phylum: Arthropoda
- Class: Insecta
- Order: Coleoptera
- Suborder: Polyphaga
- Family: Bostrichidae
- Genus: Scobicia
- Species: S. declivis

Binomial name
- Scobicia declivis (LeConte, 1860)

= Scobicia declivis =

Species of beetle

Scobicia declivis, known generally as the lead cable borer or short-circuit beetle, is a species of horned powder-post beetle in the family Bostrichidae. It is found in North America and Oceania.
