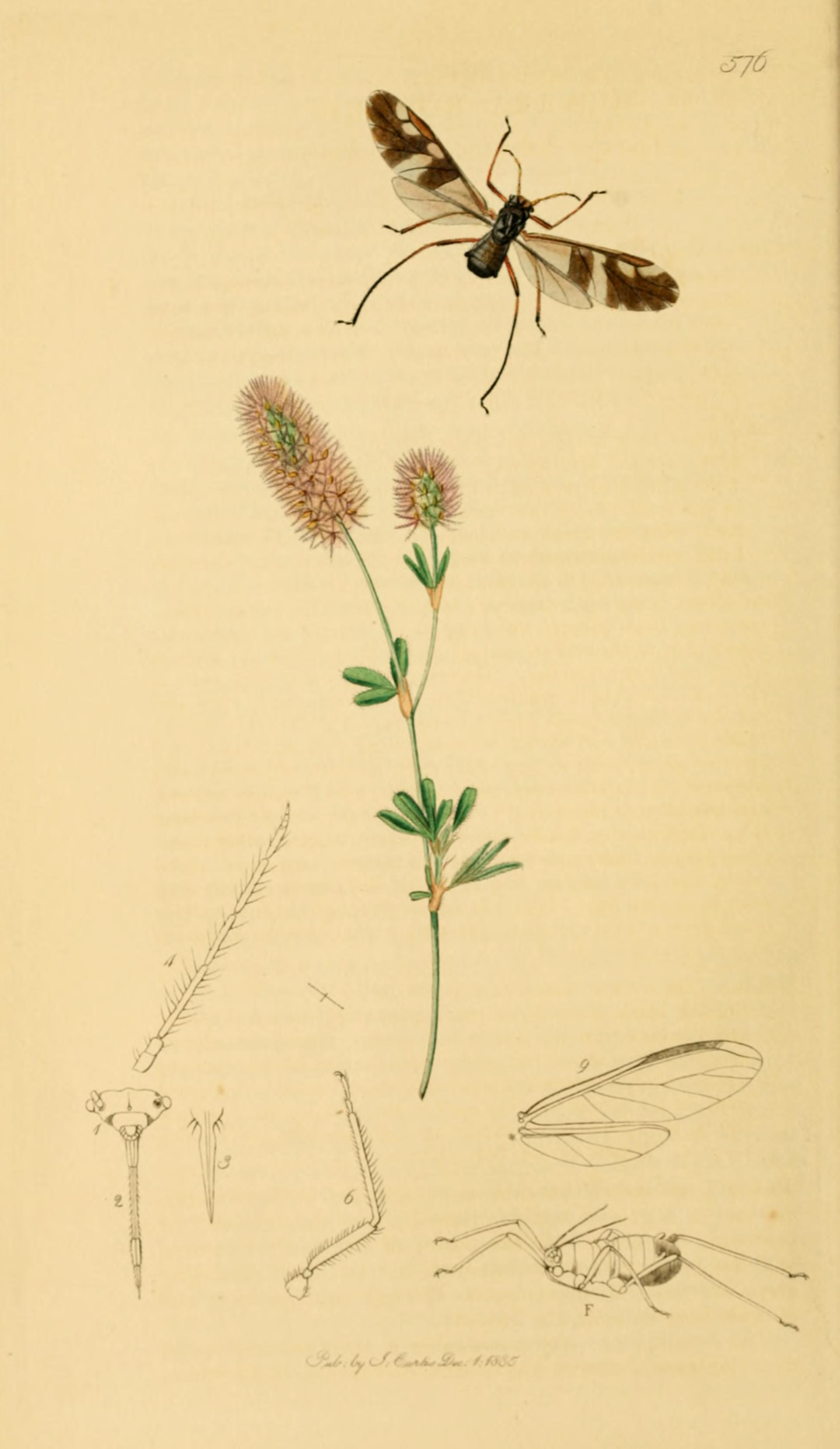
- L. roboris (Linnaeus, 1758) with Trifolium arvense, illustrated by John Curtis in British Entomology: (1) face; (2) labium; (3) labrum; (4) antennae; (6) foreleg; (9) wing; (F) female
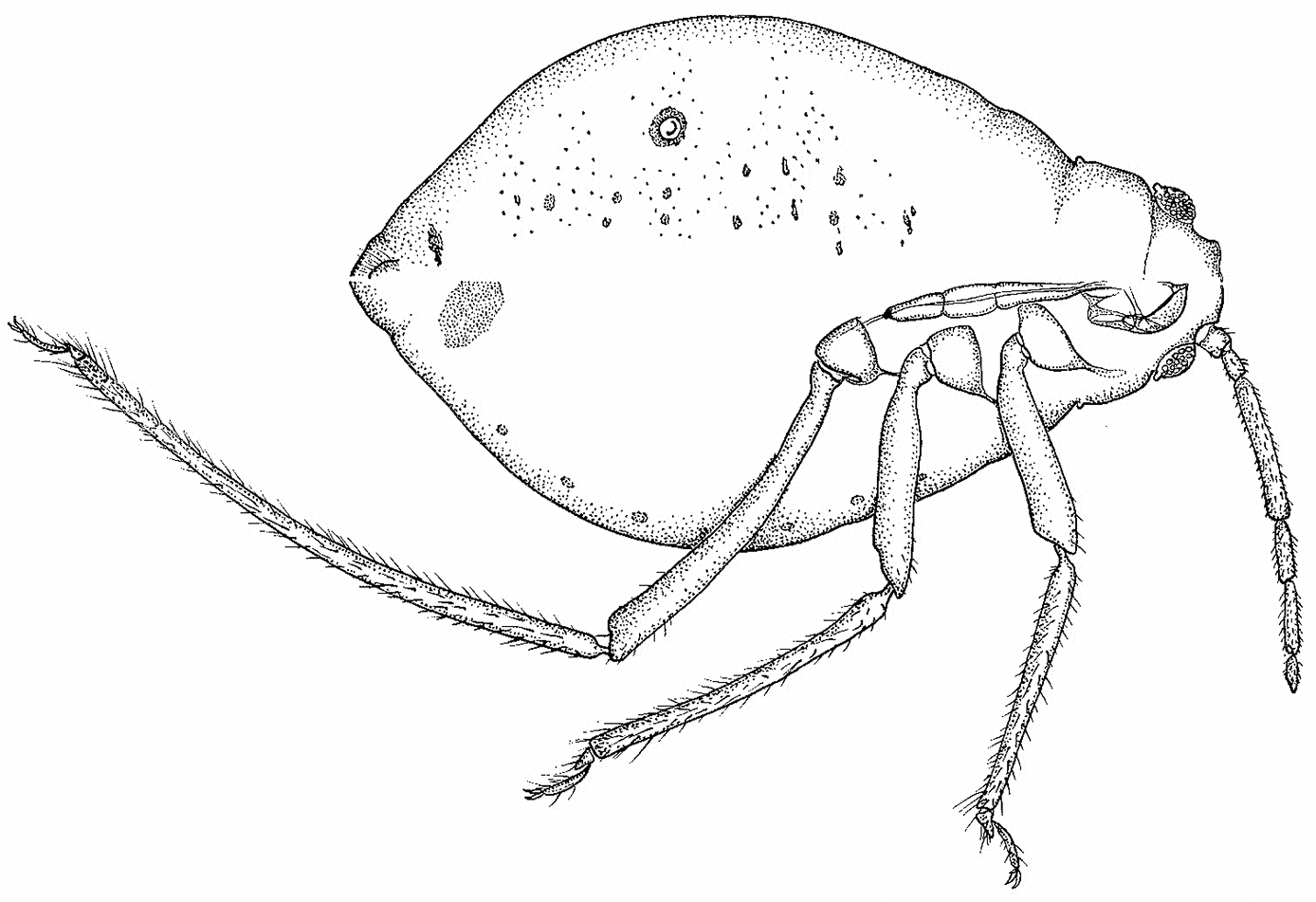
- L. pseudonudus ♀ Kanturski & Wieczorek, 2014

Scientific classification
- Kingdom: Animalia
- Phylum: Arthropoda
- Class: Insecta
- Order: Hemiptera
- Suborder: Sternorrhyncha
- Family: Aphididae
- Subfamily: Lachninae
- Genus: Lachnus; Burmeister, 1835

Type species
- Aphis roboris Linnaeus, 1758

Diversity
- About 20 species.

Synonyms
- Dryaphis Amyot, 1847; Dryobius Koch, 1855; Pterochlorus Passerini, 1860; Schizodryobius van der Goot, 1913; Sublachnobius Heinze, 1962; Taeniolachnus Amyot, 1847

= Lachnus =

Genus of true bugs

Lachnus is a genus of aphids and the name-bearing type genus of the subfamily Lachninae. It consists of about 20 species.
