= Stomaphis =

Scientific classification
- Kingdom: Animalia
- Phylum: Arthropoda
- Class: Insecta
- Order: Hemiptera
- Suborder: Sternorrhyncha
- Family: Aphididae
- Subfamily: Lachninae
- Genus: Stomaphis; Walker, 1870

Genus of true bugs

Stomaphis is a genus of true bugs belonging to the family Aphididae.

The species of this genus are found in Europe.

Species:

- Stomaphis abieticola Sorin, 2012
- Stomaphis aceris Takahashi, 1960
