= Eulachnus agilis =

Scientific classification
- Kingdom: Animalia
- Phylum: Arthropoda
- Clade: Pancrustacea
- Class: Insecta
- Order: Hemiptera
- Suborder: Sternorrhyncha
- Family: Aphididae
- Genus: Eulachnus
- Species: E. agilis

Binomial name
- Eulachnus agilis Kaltenbach, 1843

Species of insect

Eulachnus agilis is a species of aphid, known also as the two-spotted pine aphid. It is found very commonly in Europe and has also been reported in China, Korea, Turkey, the United States, and Tunisia.

== Description ==
Like other members of the Eulachnus genus, E. agilis possesses six-segmented antennae, with long hair, stout spines, and simple claws. Its body is pale green and sometimes yellowish.

== Ecology ==
They are regularly found feeding on Pinus sylvestris, as well as a number of other pine species, including Pinus halepensis and Pinus pinaster.
