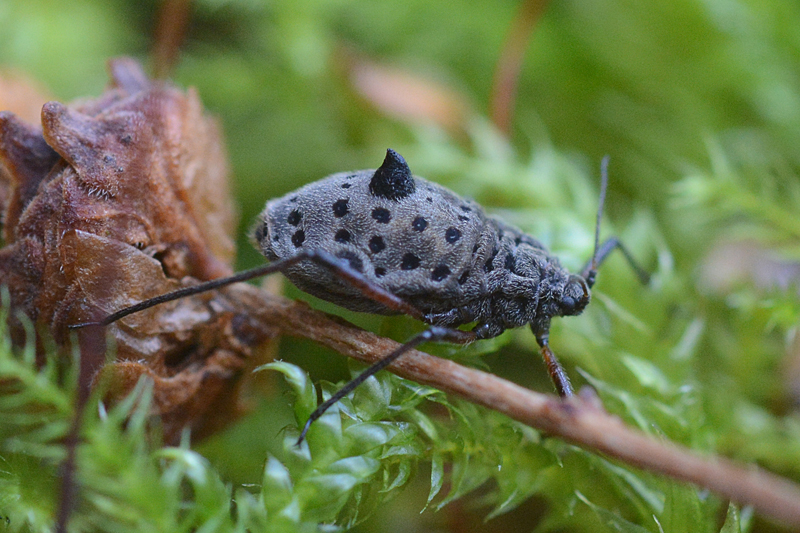
- Tuberolachnus salignus, showing dorsal tubercle

Scientific classification
- Kingdom: Animalia
- Phylum: Arthropoda
- Clade: Pancrustacea
- Class: Insecta
- Order: Hemiptera
- Suborder: Sternorrhyncha
- Family: Aphididae
- Genus: Tuberolachnus
- Species: T. salignus

Binomial name
- Tuberolachnus salignus Gmelin, 1790

= Tuberolachnus salignus =

Species of true bug

Tuberolachnus salignus, the giant willow aphid, is a species of aphid, in the genus Tuberolachnus. They are reputed to be the largest aphids, with a body length of up to 5.8mm. First described by Johann Friedrich Gmelin in 1790, it feeds on many species of willow (Salix species), and has one known host-specific parasite, Pauesia salignae.

Tuberolachnus salignus does not require a male for reproduction. Only females have ever been recorded, which suggests that reproduction is parthenogenetic and all offspring produced are genetically identical clones.

== Description ==
Adults exhibit a pear-shaped body with dark brown/grayish coloration. This aphid species has distinct black dots that form rows along its body. Along the dorsal side of their abdomen, about 2/3 of the way down, T. salignus displays a defining single large conical tubercle or bump that resembles a thorn which can grow to 0.2-0.3 mm. Closer to the posterior and along the sides of the body are two smaller black cone structures (siphunculi).

Tuberolachnus salignus reproduces solely through parthenogenesis so all aphid adults are female. Adults can be either winged or wingless. The two pairs of wings are clear with a dark brown edge along the forewing. When looking at T. salignus under a microscope the presence of numerous tiny hairs is apparent. This gives the abdomen a grayish-gold hue. Adult T. salignus has three pairs of legs that are primarily a dark brownish color, but smaller, red/orange sections are also present. They also have a pair of antennae that are less than half of the aphid's body length.

== Range ==
=== Natural global range ===
Tuberolachnus salignus is a cosmopolitan species. They exist anywhere that willow species grow naturally or are cultivated. The giant willow aphid originated in parts of Asia but has now spread to all parts of the globe (except Antarctica). There is no known exact place of origin for this aphid species, but it is believed to be somewhere within Japan and Korea. The only known parasitoid of this species is endemic to Japan, leading to the belief that this may be the place of their origin.

Tuberolachnus salignus is now found in all parts of New Zealand where willow species are present. It only recently made it to New Zealand, with the first confirmed sighting in December 2013 in Auckland.

== Habitat ==
This species is almost entirely dependent on willow trees. They live on the bark of these trees and feed on their sap. These giant aphids survive year-round with the most activity being in late summer and early fall. Their population numbers are known to be largely weather and temperature related. Following instances of large amounts of rain, T. salignus populations have been known to increase rapidly.

== Ecology ==
=== Life cycle/phenology ===
Tuberolachnus salignus has a generation period of 2–3 weeks, which is largely dependent on temperature. Once hatched, the aphid larvae go through four stages of development until they reach their adult forms. Ideal temperatures for T. salignus generation range from 17.5 to 22.5 degrees Celsius. It takes two weeks for nymphs to become adults, with adults living an additional five weeks after that. Mature aphids can produce anywhere from 35 to 71 offspring. Generally, T. salignus is most active in the warmer months, with populations peaking in late summer and early autumn. In colder months, the overall fecundity decreases but colonies are still active. In the spring, colonies are usually not visible. During this time, it is thought T. salignus retreats behind the willow tree bark or into the ground to escape the harsh climate.

Tuberolachnus salignus reproduces via parthenogenesis. Resulting in a population consisting of all females. All offspring are identical genetic clones of their mothers. In turn, there are no mating behaviors that occupy these aphids as they do not participate in sexual reproduction.

=== Diet and foraging ===
Tuberolachnus salignus is known to feed primarily on willow and Salix tree species such as the white willow (Salix alba), the common sallow (Salix cinerea') and the Indian willow (Salix tetrasperma). It has also been recorded on Quince (Cydonia oblonga), Apple (Malus spp.) and Poplar (Populus spp.)

Like many herbivorous Hemiptera, T. salignus uses modified mouthparts to pierce the phloem of plants and feed on its sap. As the name suggests, giant willow aphids prefer willows of the Salix species but have been known to feed on poplar, apple, and pear species in New Zealand. They prefer to feed during the day and during the warmer hours. When feeding, the aphid will climb to the tip of the willow where the shoot begins. The flesh of the plant is softer here, allowing the aphid to inject its stylets into the plant's phloem.

Tuberolachnus salignus uses two stylets to extract the sap flowing within the phloem. One is used to inject saliva into the phloem, while the other is used to ingest the sap and saliva mixture. Willow sap is an extremely nutritious food source, as it provides critical sugars and water to various parts of the willow tree. As the aphid feeds, it is ingesting an incredible amount of these sugars and water, so much so that it needs to excrete them to avoid overfeeding. These are excreted as a sugary liquid known as honeydew, which attracts various other insect species such as honeybees, wasps, and ants. These other species will feed on the honeydew that is excreted from T. salignus.

=== Predators, prey, and parasites ===
Due to the almost exclusive feeding of willow sap by T. salignus, the honeydew that is produced as a result attracts numerous types of insects. Wasps, bees, ants, flies and coccinellids have all been observed to feed on honeydew of this species. These insects feed only on the honeydew, not the actual aphid. In New Zealand, Pauesia nigrovaria was introduced as a biocontrol parasitoid of T. salignus in 2020. Elsewhere, like North America and parts of Europe, parasitic wasps, lady beetles, hover fly maggots, lace wings are frequent predators.

== Interactions with humans ==
Tuberolachnus salignus has only recently come into the limelight in New Zealand. Upon arriving there in 2013, cause for alarm was immediately raised. As previously noted, these giant aphids feed almost exclusively on willow species. As T. salignus populations begin to rapidly grow on the willow tree, many negative impacts start to become apparent.

Willow trees are an important group of plants in New Zealand. While they are not native, they are used in many facets of society in order to increase land stabilization and reduce soil erosion. Historically, willows have been planted along riverbanks and on particularly sloping land to help keep the soil beneath from eroding away. Furthermore, willows play an important role in honey production throughout New Zealand. The flowers of willows are rich with pollen and nectar and attract honeybees. In other parts of the world, such as the U.K., large amounts of willows are cultivated for biomass production. With the presence of large T. salignus colonies on willow trees, many of the contributions listed above are severely hindered. Additionally, honeybees that forage on T. salignus honeydew have poorer health and produce a lower quantity and quality of honey.
