= Maculolachnus =

Scientific classification
- Kingdom: Animalia
- Phylum: Arthropoda
- Class: Insecta
- Order: Hemiptera
- Suborder: Sternorrhyncha
- Family: Aphididae
- Subfamily: Lachninae
- Genus: Maculolachnus; Gaumont, 1920

Genus of true bugs

Maculolachnus is a genus of true bugs belonging to the family Aphididae.

The species of this genus are found in Europe and Northern America.

Species:

- Maculolachnus rubi Ghosh & Raychaudhuri, 1972
- Maculolachnus sijpkensi Hille Ris Lambers, 1962
