= Eulachnus =

Scientific classification
- Kingdom: Animalia
- Phylum: Arthropoda
- Class: Insecta
- Order: Hemiptera
- Suborder: Sternorrhyncha
- Family: Aphididae
- Subfamily: Lachninae
- Genus: Eulachnus; Guercio, 1909

Genus of true bugs

Eulachnus is a genus of true bugs belonging to the family Aphididae.

The species of this genus are found in Eurasia and America.

Species:

- Eulachnus agilis (Kaltenbach, 1843)
- Eulachnus alticola Börner, 1940
- Eulachnus americanus Takahashi, 1932
- Eulachnus blackmani Kanturski, Qiao & Favret, 2022
- Eulachnus brevipilosus Börner, 1940
- Eulachnus cembrae Börner, 1950
- Eulachnus drakontos Zhang & Qiao, 1999
- Eulachnus garganicus Binazzi, 1983
- Eulachnus ibericus Binazzi & Mier Durante, 1997
- Eulachnus intermedius Binazzi, 1989
- Eulachnus isensis Sorin, 2012
- Eulachnus mediterraneus Binazzi, 1983
- Eulachnus mingazzinii Del Guercio, 1909
- Eulachnus nigricola Pašek, 1953
- Eulachnus nigrofasciatus Del Guercio, 1909
- Eulachnus piniarmandifoliae Zhang, 1992
- Eulachnus pinisuctus Zhang, Chen, Zhong & Li, 1999
- Eulachnus pinitabulaeformis Zhang, 1992
- Eulachnus pumilae Inouye, 1939
- Eulachnus rileyi Williams, 1911
- Eulachnus similialticola Zhang, 2002
- Eulachnus stekolshchikovi Kanturski, 2017
- Eulachnus thunbergii Wilson, 1919
- Eulachnus tuberculostemmatus Theobald, 1915
