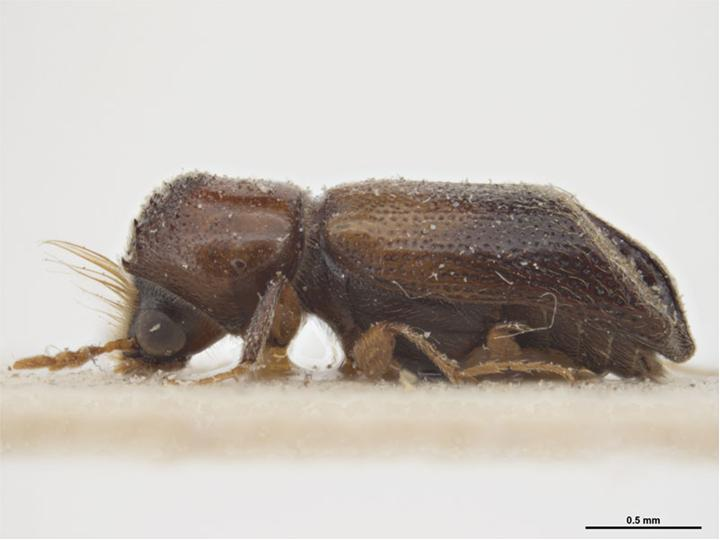

Scientific classification
- Domain: Eukaryota
- Kingdom: Animalia
- Phylum: Arthropoda
- Class: Insecta
- Order: Coleoptera
- Suborder: Polyphaga
- Family: Bostrichidae
- Tribe: Xyloperthini
- Genus: Scobicia
- Species: S. chevrieri

Binomial name
- Scobicia chevrieri (Villa & Villa, 1835)

= Scobicia chevrieri =

Species of beetle

Scobicia chevrieri is a species of horned powder-post beetle in the family Bostrichidae. It is found in Africa, Europe and Northern Asia (excluding China), and North America.
