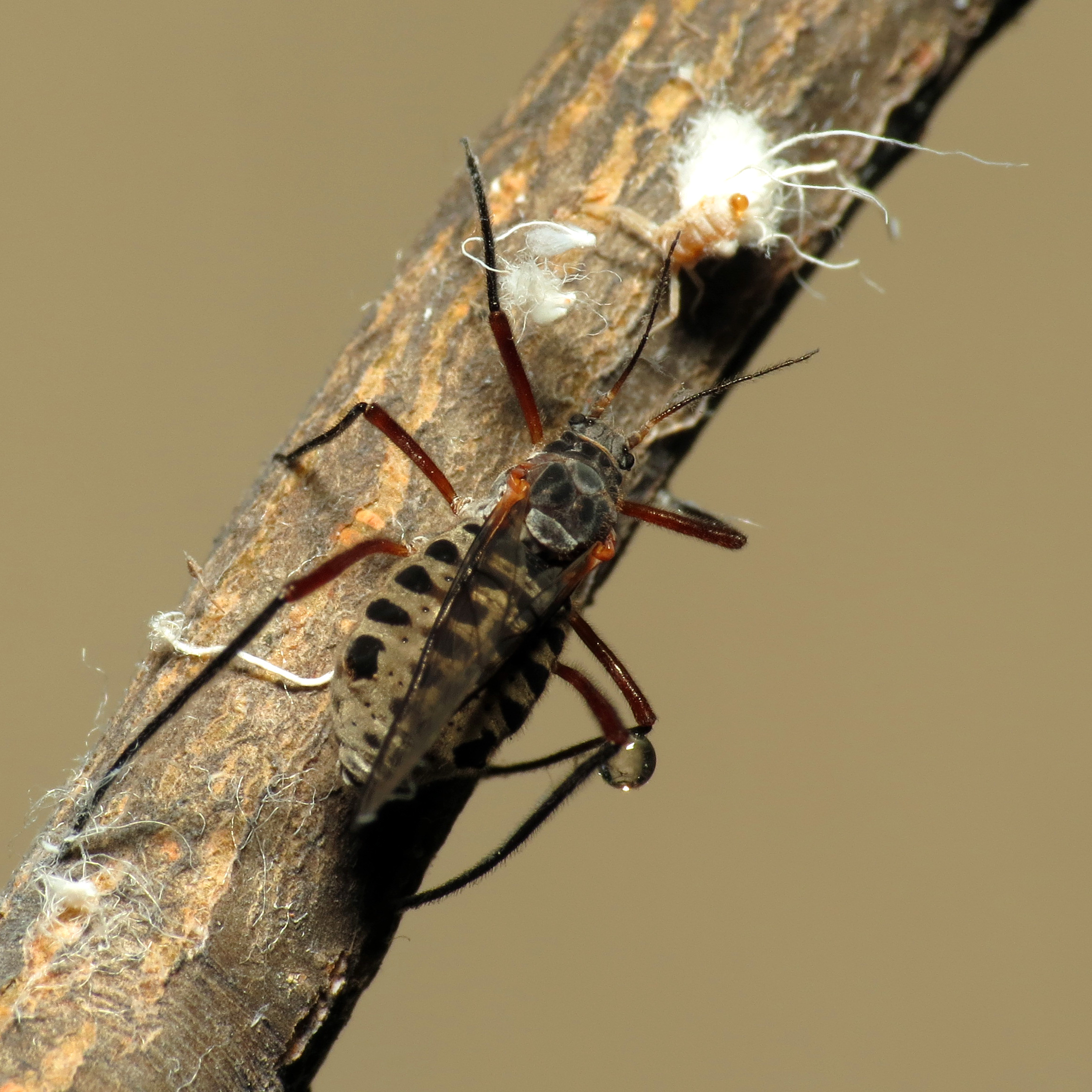
- Longistigma caryae

Scientific classification
- Domain: Eukaryota
- Kingdom: Animalia
- Phylum: Arthropoda
- Class: Insecta
- Order: Hemiptera
- Suborder: Sternorrhyncha
- Family: Aphididae
- Subfamily: Lachninae
- Genus: Longistigma; Wilson, 1909

= Longistigma =

Genus of true bugs

Longistigma is a genus of giant aphids in the family Aphididae. There are at least three described species in Longistigma.

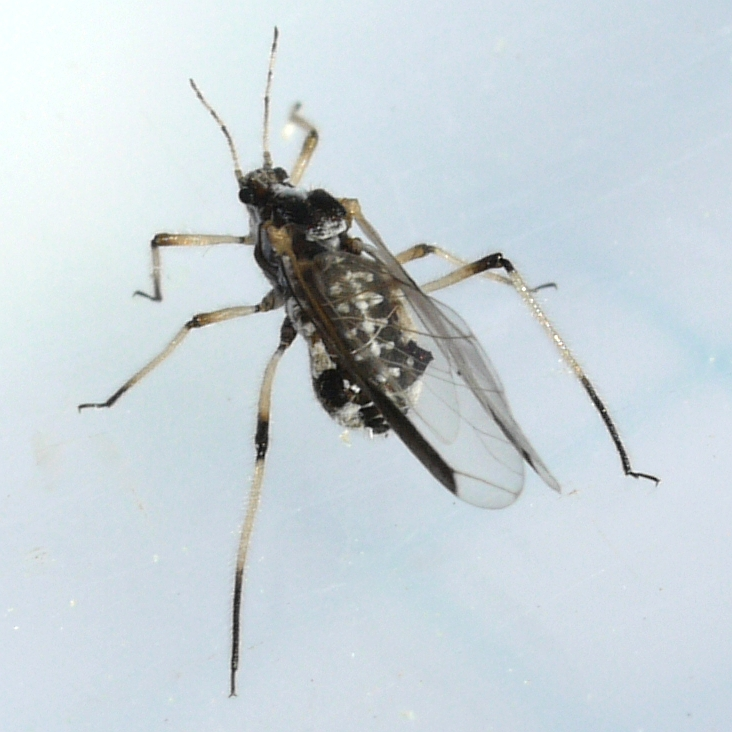
Longistigma caryae

== Species ==
These three species belong to the genus Longistigma:

- Longistigma caryae (Harris, T.W., 1841)^{c g b} (giant bark aphid)
- Longistigma liquidambarus (Takahashi, R., 1925)^{c g}
- Longistigma xizangensis Zhang, Guangxue, 1981^{c g}

Data sources: i = ITIS, c = Catalogue of Life, g = GBIF, b = Bugguide.net
