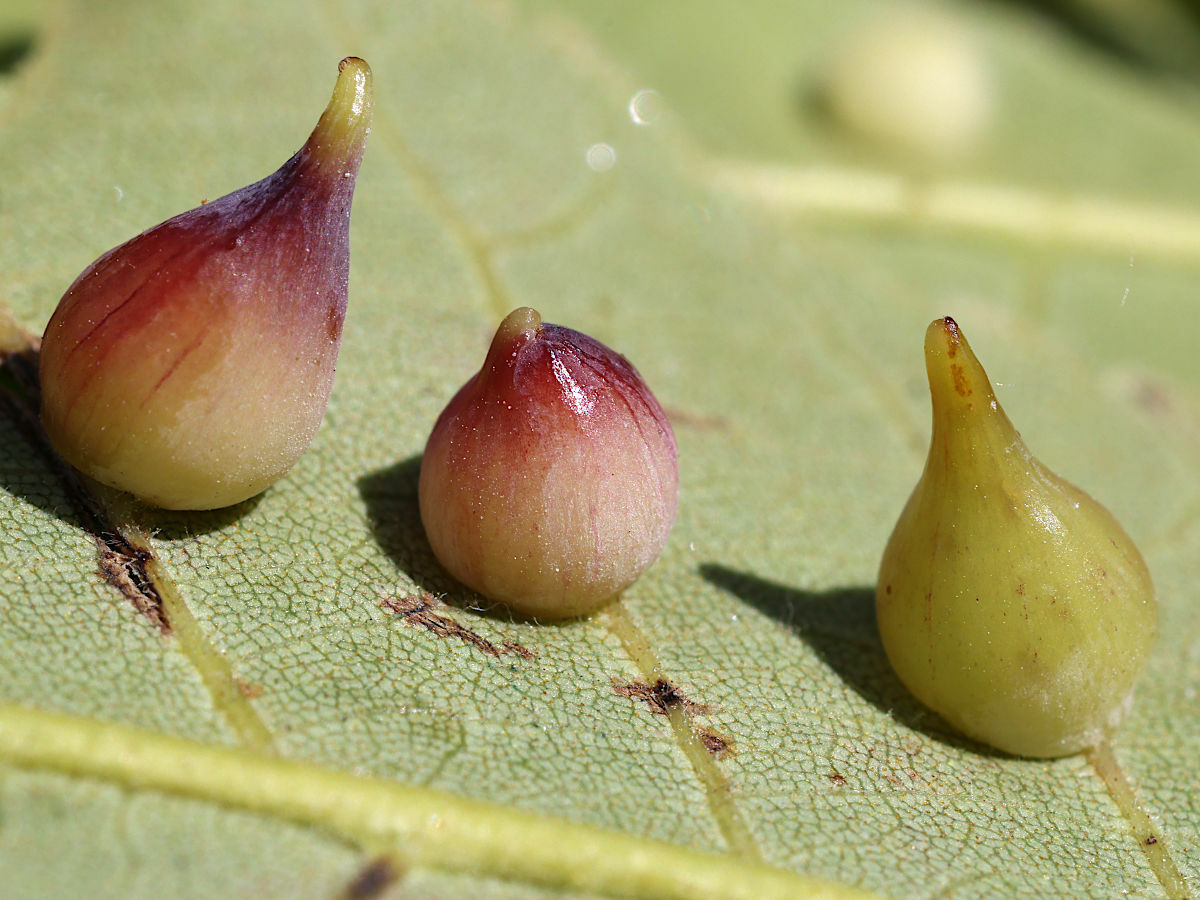
- galls on hickory leaf

Scientific classification
- Domain: Eukaryota
- Kingdom: Animalia
- Phylum: Arthropoda
- Class: Insecta
- Order: Diptera
- Family: Cecidomyiidae
- Genus: Caryomyia
- Species: C. caryaecola

Binomial name
- Caryomyia caryaecola (Osten Sacken, 1862)

Synonyms
- Cecidomyia caryaecola Osten Sacken, 1862

= Caryomyia caryaecola =

Species of fly

Caryomyia caryaecola, the hickory onion gall midge, is a species of gall midges in the family Cecidomyiidae.
