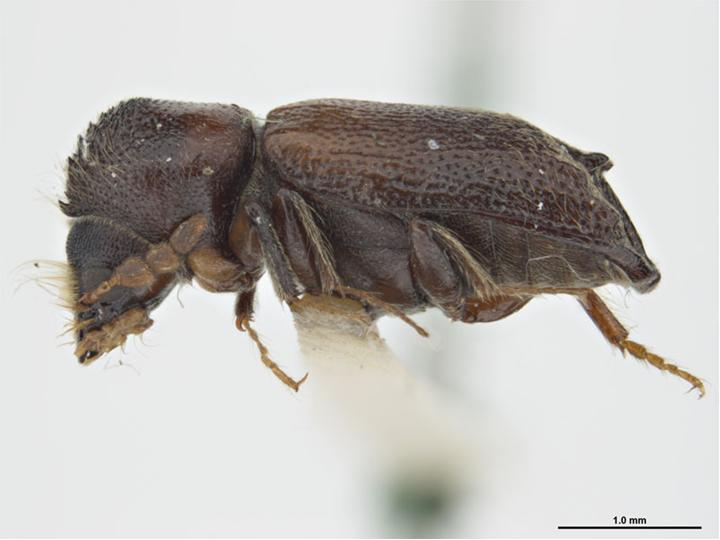
- Scobicia bidentata

Scientific classification
- Kingdom: Animalia
- Phylum: Arthropoda
- Class: Insecta
- Order: Coleoptera
- Suborder: Polyphaga
- Family: Bostrichidae
- Subfamily: Bostrichinae
- Tribe: Xyloperthini
- Genus: Scobicia; Lesne, 1901

= Scobicia =

Genus of beetles

Scobicia is a genus of horned powder-post beetles in the family Bostrichidae. There are about 11 described species in Scobicia.

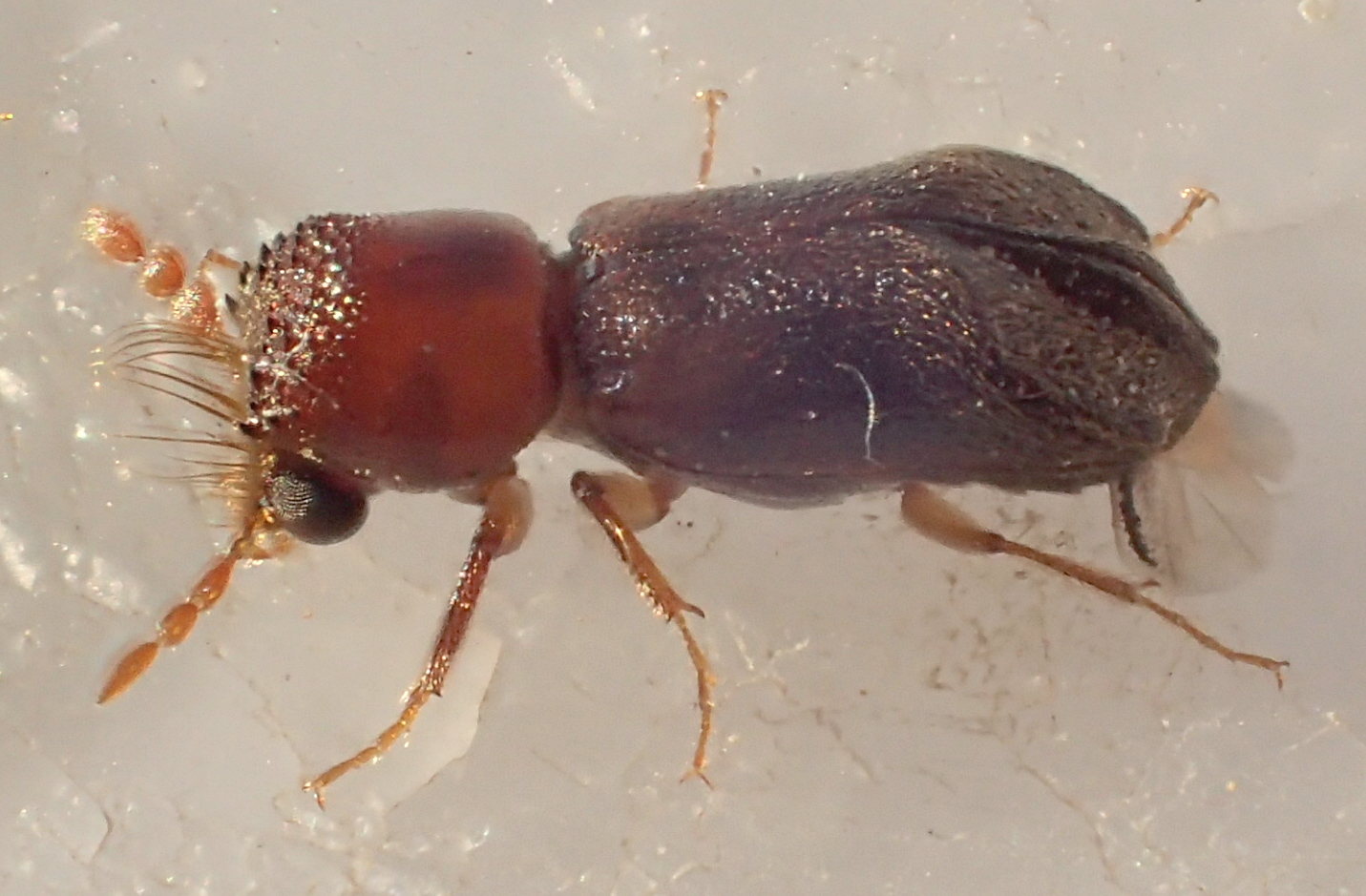
Scobicia pustulata

== Species ==
These 11 species belong to the genus Scobicia:

- Scobicia arizonica Lesne, 1907
- Scobicia barbata (Wollaston, 1860)
- Scobicia barbifrons (Wollaston, 1864)
- Scobicia bidentata (Horn, 1878)
- Scobicia chevrieri (Villa & Villa, 1835)
- Scobicia declivis (LeConte, 1860) (lead cable borer)
- Scobicia ficicola (Wollaston, 1865)
- Scobicia lesnei Fisher, 1950
- Scobicia monticola Fisher, 1950
- Scobicia pustulata (Fabricius, 1801)
- Scobicia suturalis (Horn, 1878)
