= Schizolachnus =

Scientific classification
- Kingdom: Animalia
- Phylum: Arthropoda
- Clade: Pancrustacea
- Class: Insecta
- Order: Hemiptera
- Suborder: Sternorrhyncha
- Family: Aphididae
- Genus: Schizolachnus; Mordvilko, 1908

Genus of true bugs

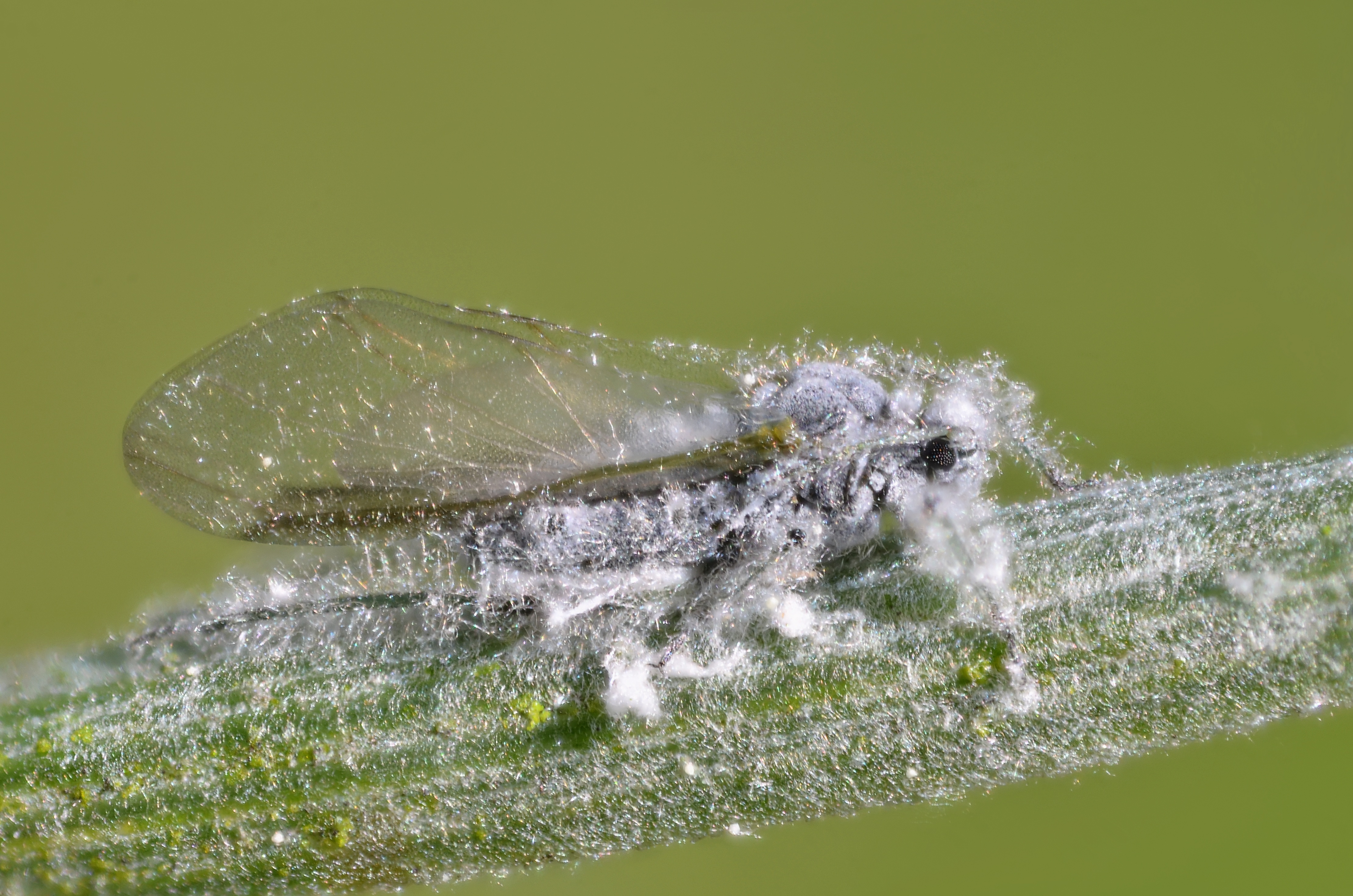
Schizolachnus obscura

Schizolachnus is a genus of true bugs belonging to the family Aphididae.

The species of this genus are found in Europe and Northern America.

Species:

- Schizolachnus curvispinosus
- Schizolachnus flocculosus
