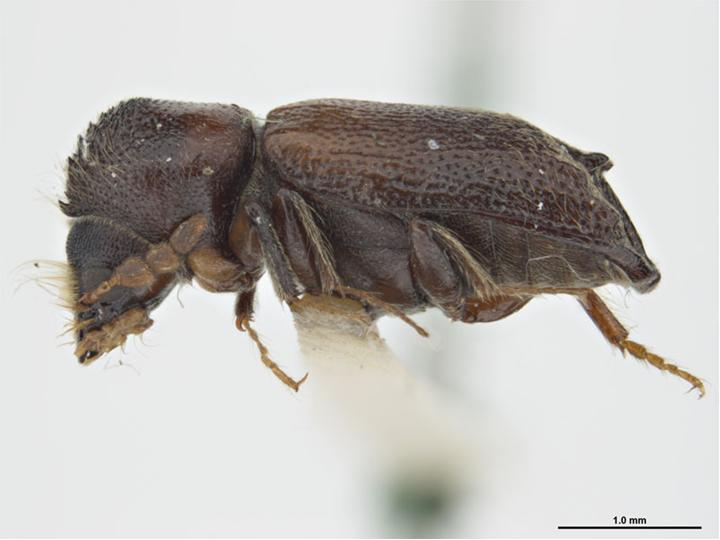

Scientific classification
- Domain: Eukaryota
- Kingdom: Animalia
- Phylum: Arthropoda
- Class: Insecta
- Order: Coleoptera
- Suborder: Polyphaga
- Family: Bostrichidae
- Tribe: Xyloperthini
- Genus: Scobicia
- Species: S. bidentata

Binomial name
- Scobicia bidentata (Horn, 1878)

= Scobicia bidentata =

Species of beetle

Scobicia bidentata is a species of horned powder-post beetle in the family Bostrichidae. It is found in North America.
