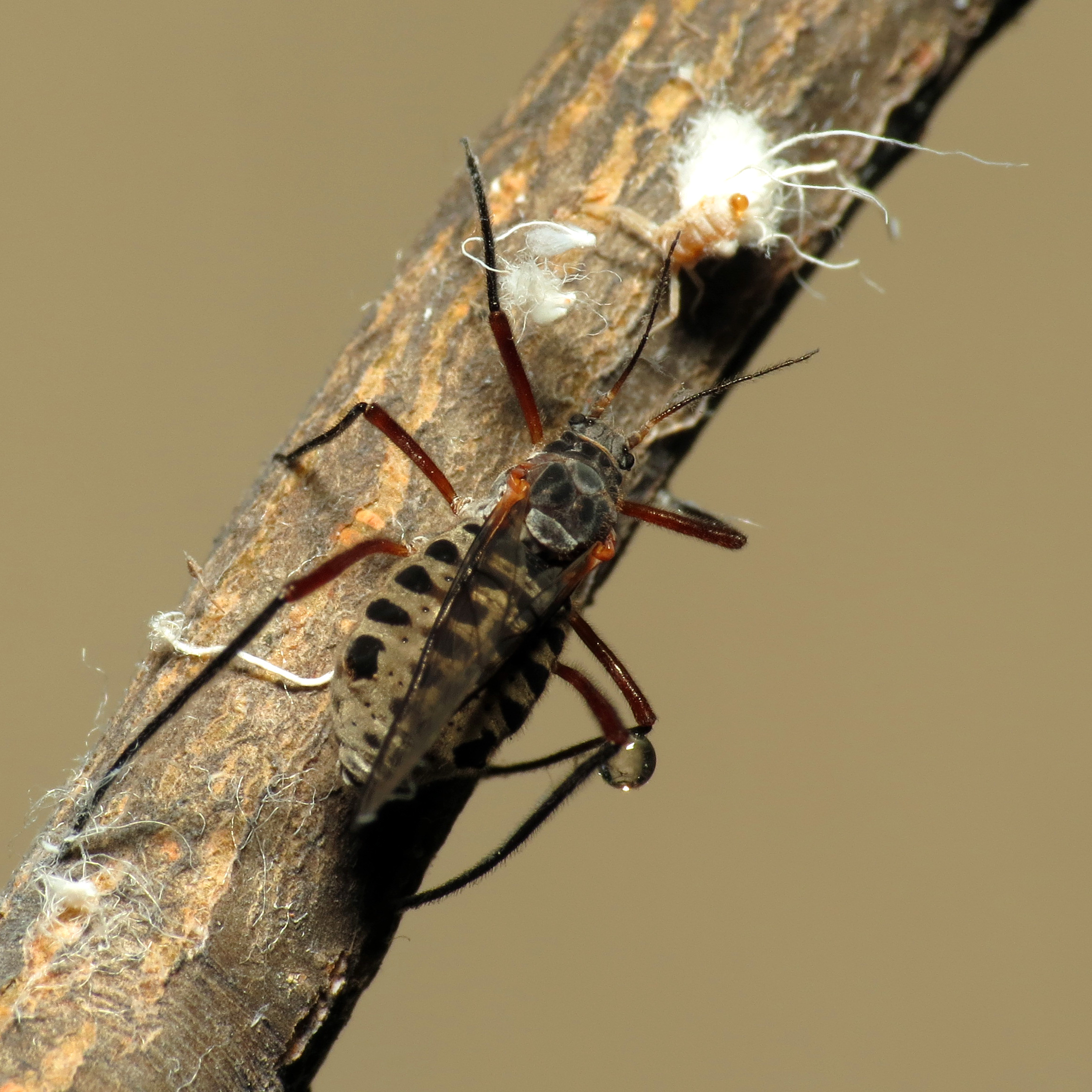

Scientific classification
- Domain: Eukaryota
- Kingdom: Animalia
- Phylum: Arthropoda
- Class: Insecta
- Order: Hemiptera
- Suborder: Sternorrhyncha
- Family: Aphididae
- Genus: Longistigma
- Species: L. caryae

Binomial name
- Longistigma caryae (Harris, T.W., 1841)

= Longistigma caryae =

Species of true bug

Longistigma caryae, the giant bark aphid, is a species of giant aphid in the family Aphididae.

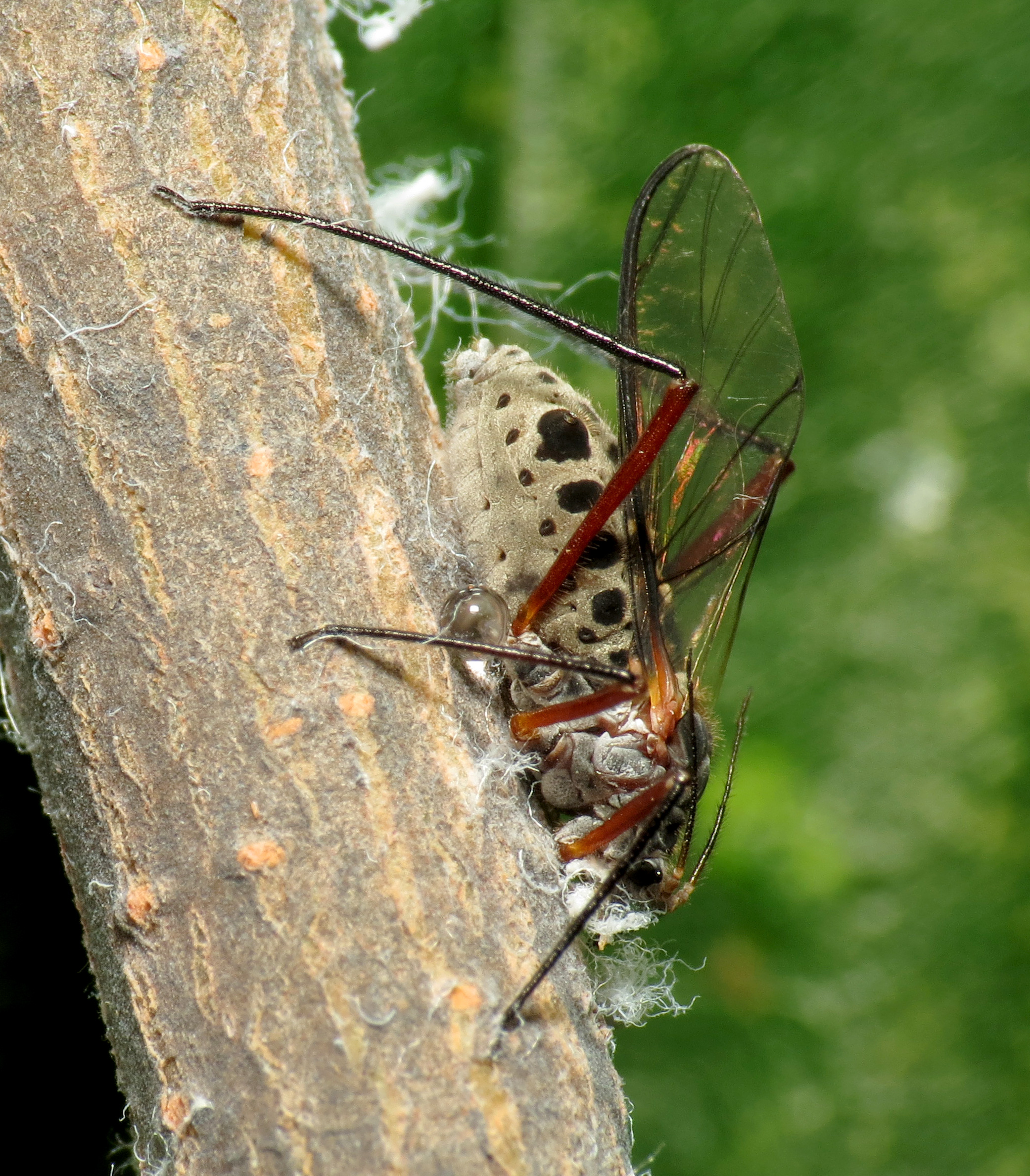
Giant bark aphid, Longistigma caryae

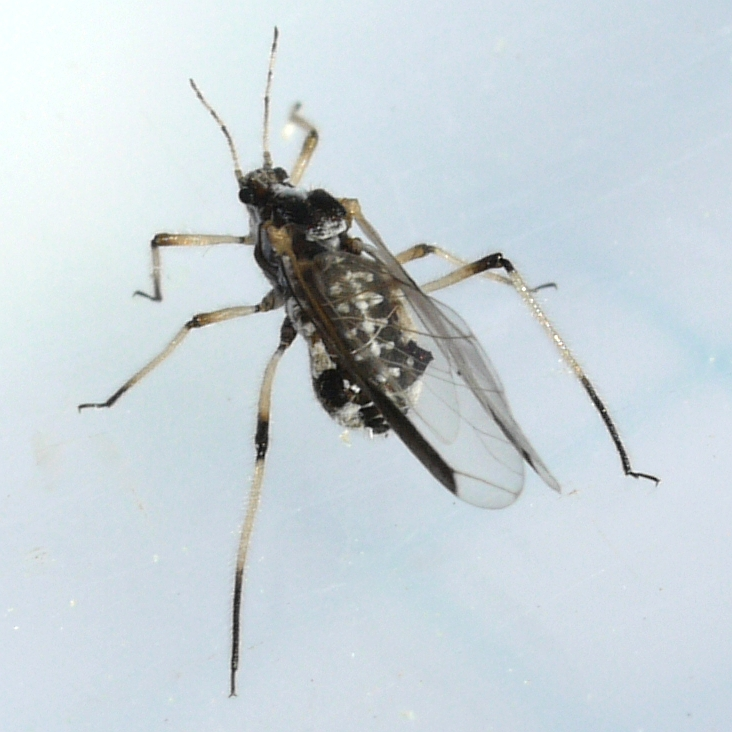
Giant bark aphid, Longistigma caryae
