= Trama (aphid) =

Scientific classification
- Domain: Eukaryota
- Kingdom: Animalia
- Phylum: Arthropoda
- Class: Insecta
- Order: Hemiptera
- Suborder: Sternorrhyncha
- Family: Aphididae
- Subfamily: Lachninae
- Genus: Trama; Heyden, 1837

Species
- See text

Genus of true bugs

Trama is a genus of aphids, in the order Hemiptera. They are noted for their lack of sexual reproduction.

== Species ==
- Trama afghanica Narzikulov, 1973
- Trama antennata Mordvilko, 1935
- Trama baronii Hille Ris Lambers, 1969
- Trama bazarovi Narzikulov, 1966
- Trama caudata Del Guercio, 1909
- Trama centaureae Börner, 1940
- Trama eastopi Heinze, 1962
- Trama euphorbiae Juchnevitch & Kan, 1971
- Trama formicella Theobald, 1929
- Trama helianthemi Westwood 1843, originally Rhizobius helianthemi
- Trama kulinitschae Narzikulov, 1969
- Trama maritima Eastop, 1953
- Trama mordwilkoi or Trama mordvilkoi Börner, 1940
- Trama muchinae Kan & Folk, 1986
- Trama narzykulovi or Trama narzikulovi Kan, 1962 reclassified as Protrama narzykulovi
- Trama nigrarta Zhang, Chen, Zhong & Li, 1999)
- Trama pamirica Narzikulov, 1963 reclassified as Protrama pamirica
- Trama penecaeca Stroyan, 1964 reclassified as Protrama penecaeca
- Trama rara Mordvilko, 1908
- Trama taraxaci Shinji, 1930
- Trama troglodytes von Heyden, 1837
