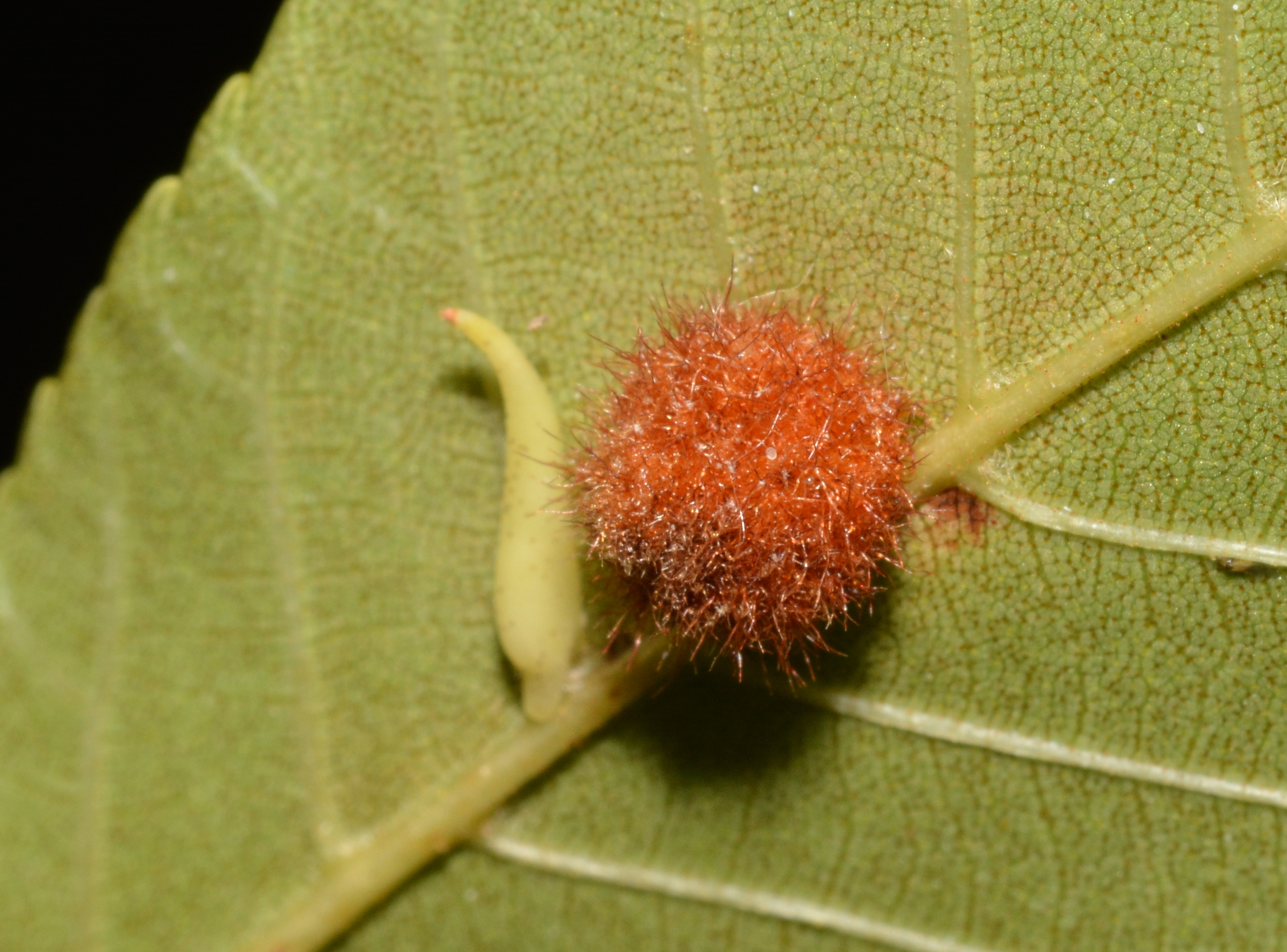
- Galls caused by Caryomyia spp.

Scientific classification
- Domain: Eukaryota
- Kingdom: Animalia
- Phylum: Arthropoda
- Class: Insecta
- Order: Diptera
- Family: Cecidomyiidae
- Tribe: Cecidomyiini
- Genus: Caryomyia

= Caryomyia =

Genus of flies

Caryomyia is a genus of hickory gall midges in the family Cecidomyiidae. They are often known as the hickory gall midges since most species feed on various species of hickory. There are at least 30 described species in Caryomyia.

== Species ==
- Caryomyia aggregata Gagné, 2008 (hickory aggregate gall midge)
- Caryomyia albipilosa Gagné, 2008 (hickory white-haired gall midge)
- Caryomyia ansericollum Gagné, 2008
- Caryomyia antennata Felt, 1909
- Caryomyia arcuata Gagné, 2008 (hickory sombrero gall midge)
- Caryomyia asteris Gagné, 2008 (hickory starburst gall midge)
- Caryomyia biretta Gagné, 2008
- Caryomyia caminata Gagné, 2008
- Caryomyia caryae (Osten Sacken, 1862) (hickory sticky globe gall midge)
- Caryomyia caryaecola (Osten Sacken, 1862) (hickory onion gall midge)
- Caryomyia cilidolium Gagné, 2008 (hickory fuzzy ginger jar gall midge)
- Caryomyia conoidea Gagné, 2008
- Caryomyia consobrina Felt, 1909
- Caryomyia cucurbitata Gagné, 2008 (hickory pumpkin gall midge)
- Caryomyia cynipsea (Osten Sacken, 1862)
- Caryomyia deflexipili Gagné, 2008
- Caryomyia echinata Gagné, 2008 (hickory spiny gall midge)
- Caryomyia eumaris Gagné, 2008
- Caryomyia flaticrustum Gagné, 2008 (hickory puff tart gall midge)
- Caryomyia glauciglobus Gagné, 2008 (hickory blue-powder gall midge)
- Caryomyia glebosa Gagné, 2008
- Caryomyia guttata Gagné, 2008
- Caryomyia hirtidolium Gagné, 2008
- Caryomyia hirtiglobus Gagné, 2008 (hickory woody globe gall midge)
- Caryomyia holotricha (Osten Sacken, 1862)
- Caryomyia inanis Felt, 1909
- Caryomyia inclinata Gagné, 2008
- Caryomyia inflata Gagné, 2008
- Caryomyia lenta Gagné, 2008 (hickory popover gall midge)
- Caryomyia levicrustum Gagné, 2008
- Caryomyia leviglobus Gagné, 2008
- Caryomyia marginata Gagné, 2008
- Caryomyia melicrustum Gagné, 2008
- Caryomyia ovalis Gagné, 2008
- Caryomyia persicoides (Osten Sacken, 1862) (hickory peach-haired gall midge)
- Caryomyia procumbens Gagné, 2008
- Caryomyia purpurea Gagné, 2008 (hickory purple gumdrop gall midge)
- Caryomyia recurvata Gagné, 2008
- Caryomyia sanguinolenta (Osten Sacken, 1862) (hickory smooth gumdrop gall midge)
- Caryomyia shmoo Gagné, 2008
- Caryomyia similis Felt, 1909
- Caryomyia spherica Gagné, 2008
- Caryomyia spiniglobus Gagné, 2008 (hickory spiny ball gall midge)
- Caryomyia spinulosa Gagné, 2008
- Caryomyia stellata Gagné, 2008 (hickory starry-base gall midge)
- Caryomyia striolacrustum Gagné, 2008
- Caryomyia striolata Gagné, 2008
- Caryomyia subpina Gagné, 2008
- Caryomyia subulata Gagné, 2008 (hickory awl-shaped gall midge)
- Caryomyia thompsoni (Felt, 1908) (hickory placenta gall midge)
- Caryomyia tuberculata Gagné, 2008 (hickory bumpy woody gall midge)
- Caryomyia tuberidolium Gagné, 2008
- Caryomyia tubicola (Osten Sacken, 1862) (hickory bullet gall midge)
- Caryomyia turbanella Gagné, 2008
- Caryomyia turbinata Gagné, 2008
- Caryomyia urnula Gagné, 2008 (hickory urn gall midge)
- Caryomyia viscidolium Gagné, 2008 (hickory sticky ginger jar gall midge)
