= Xenothictis gnetivora =

Scientific classification
- Domain: Eukaryota
- Kingdom: Animalia
- Phylum: Arthropoda
- Class: Insecta
- Order: Lepidoptera
- Family: Tortricidae
- Genus: Xenothictis
- Species: X. gnetivora

Binomial name
- Xenothictis gnetivora Brown, Miller & Horak, 2003

Species of moth

Xenothictis gnetivora is a species of moth of the family Tortricidae. It is found in Papua New Guinea.

The length of the forewings is 6.5–8.1 mm for males and 7.9–9.6 mm for females.

The larvae feed on Gnetum gnemon, Sterculia schumanniana, Celtis philippensis, Ficus nodosa, Ficus variegata, Artocarpus communis, Psychotria micralabastra and Leucosyke capitellata.

== Etymology ==
The species name is derived from Gnetum, the genus of the most common larval host, and Latin vorare (meaning to eat).
