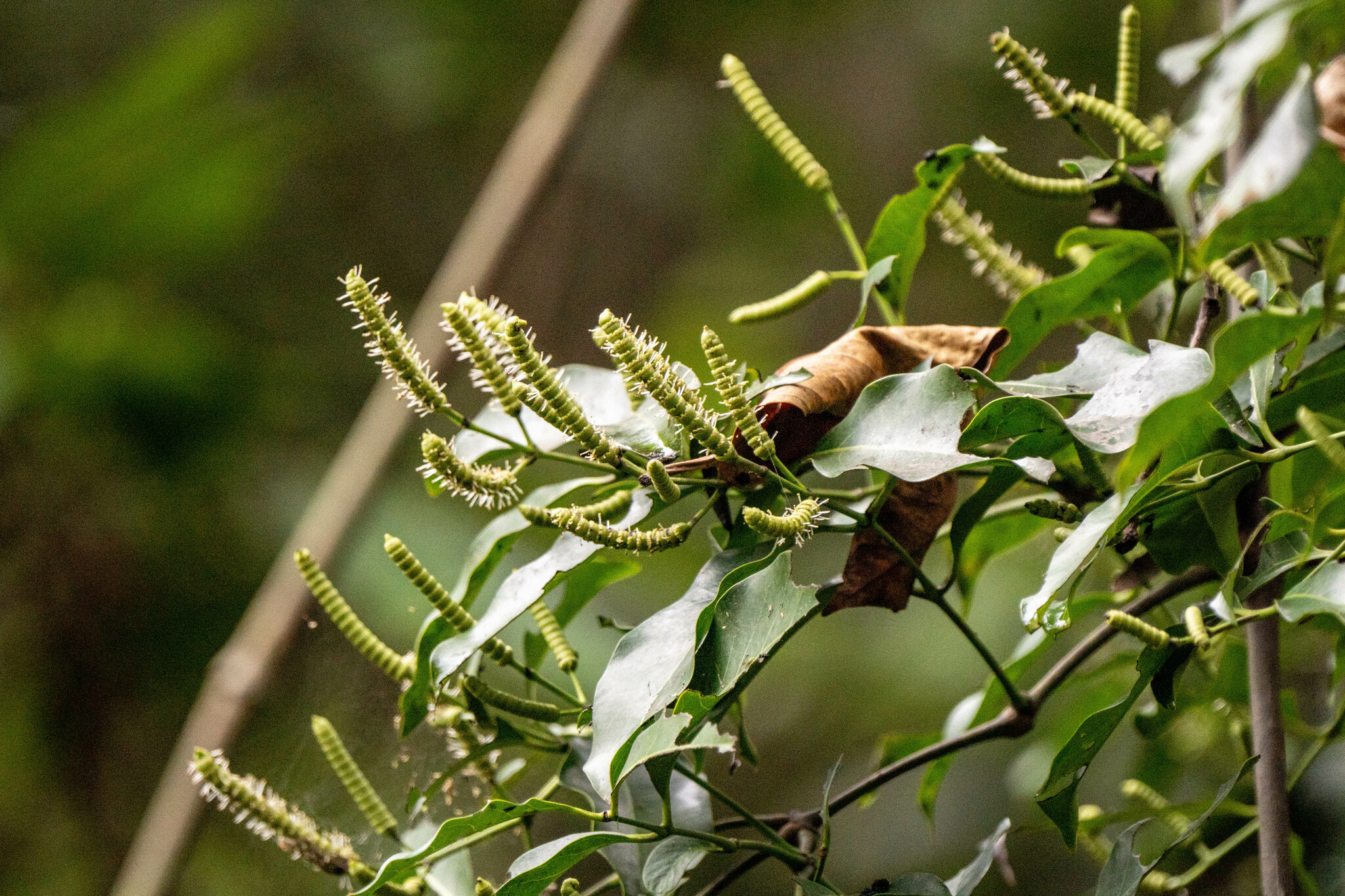

Conservation status
- Near Threatened (IUCN 3.1)

Scientific classification
- Kingdom: Plantae
- Clade: Tracheophytes
- Clade: Gymnospermae
- Division: Gnetophyta
- Order: Gnetales
- Family: Gnetaceae
- Genus: Gnetum
- Species: G. luofuense

Binomial name
- Gnetum luofuense C.Y.Chang

= Gnetum luofuense =

Species of seed-bearing plant

Gnetum luofuense, also known as luo fu mai ma teng (Chinese: 罗浮买麻藤), is a species of gymnosperm in the family Gnetaceae. It is native to southeastern China and is considered a near threatened species.

== Distribution and habitat ==
Gnetum luofuense is native to southeastern China and can be found in Fujian, Guangdong, southern Jiangxi, and Hong Kong, with the type locality being Luófú Shān in Guangdong province. It grows in dense, moist forests at elevations of 20 m (66 ft) to 1,000 m (3,300 ft).

== Description ==
Gnetum luofuense is a dioecious vine with purplish-brown bark. The oblong or oblong-ovate leaves may be papery or leathery in texture and measure 10–18 cm (3.9–7.1 in) by 5–8 cm (2.0–3.1 in).

== Ecology ==
Pollination occurs from May to July, with seeds reaching maturity from August to October. Nocturnal moths appear to be the predominant pollinator of this species, but other insects often visit the strobili without pollinating. Asian honey bees (Apis cerana) have been found to steal pollen from male strobili.

== Conservation status ==
Gnetum luofuense is listed as near threatened on the International Union for Conservation of Nature Red List. It is threatened by habitat loss due to deforestation, with much of its native forest habitat having been cleared for agricultural use.
