= Urens =

Urens may refer to these species:

- Sterculia urens, a species of tree native to India.
- Urtica urens, a species of flowering plant native to Eurasia.
- Caryota urens, a species of flowering plant in the palm family.
- Gnetum urens, a species of vine native to northern South America.
