= Xenothictis coena =

Scientific classification
- Kingdom: Animalia
- Phylum: Arthropoda
- Clade: Pancrustacea
- Class: Insecta
- Order: Lepidoptera
- Family: Tortricidae
- Genus: Xenothictis
- Species: X. coena

Binomial name
- Xenothictis coena (Diakonoff, 1961)

Synonyms
- Xeneda coena Diakonoff, 1961

Species of moth

Xenothictis coena is a species of moth of the family Tortricidae. It is found in New Caledonia.
