= Xenothictis paragona =

Scientific classification
- Domain: Eukaryota
- Kingdom: Animalia
- Phylum: Arthropoda
- Class: Insecta
- Order: Lepidoptera
- Family: Tortricidae
- Genus: Xenothictis
- Species: X. paragona

Binomial name
- Xenothictis paragona Meyrick, 1910

Species of moth

Xenothictis paragona is a species of moth of the family Tortricidae. It is found on the Loyalty Islands in the south-west Pacific.
