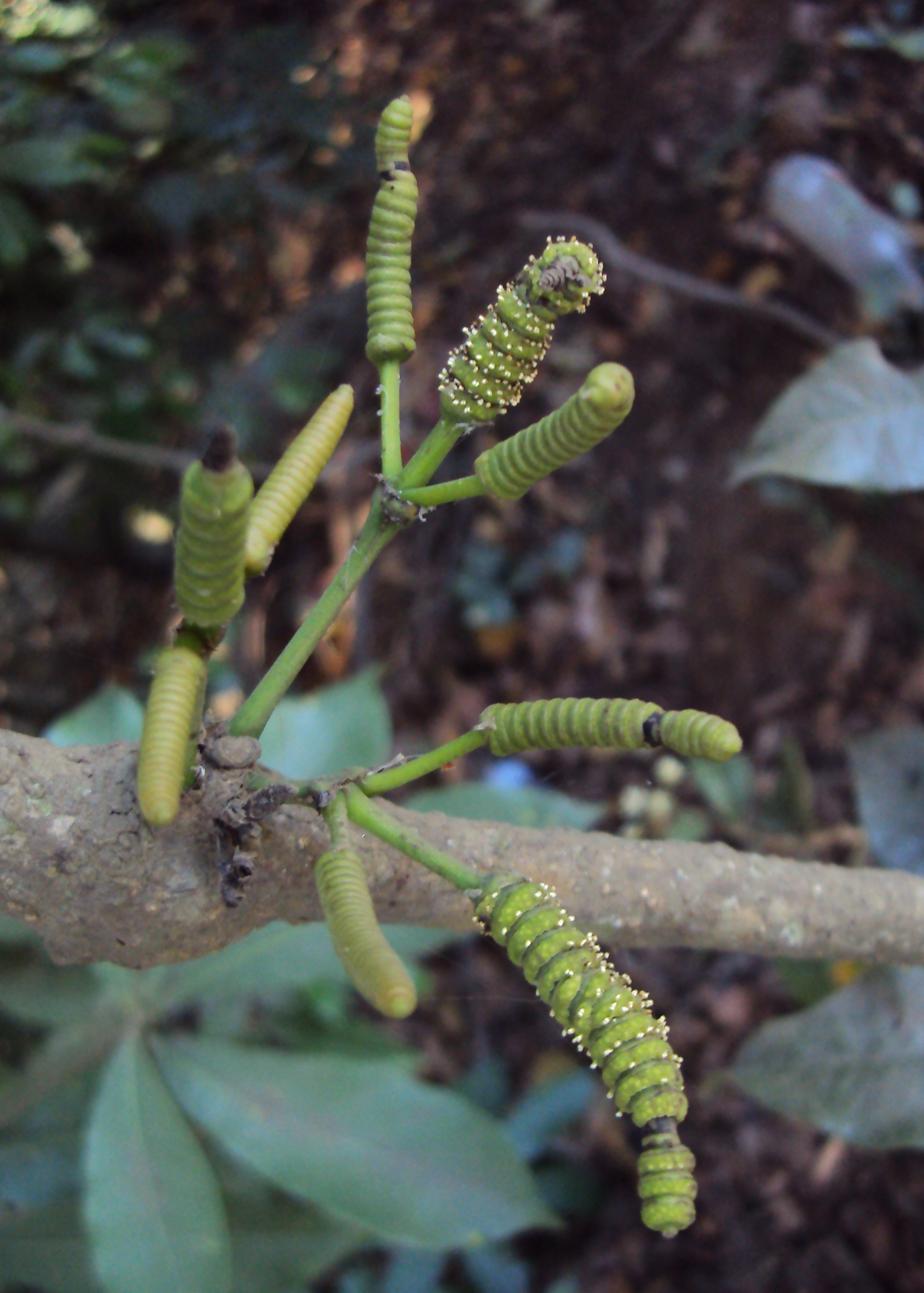

Conservation status
- Least Concern (IUCN 3.1)

Scientific classification
- Kingdom: Plantae
- Clade: Tracheophytes
- Clade: Gymnospermae
- Division: Gnetophyta
- Order: Gnetales
- Family: Gnetaceae
- Genus: Gnetum
- Species: G. latifolium

Binomial name
- Gnetum latifolium Blume

Synonyms
- Gnemon latifolia (Blume) Kuntze

= Gnetum latifolium =

Species of seed-bearing plant

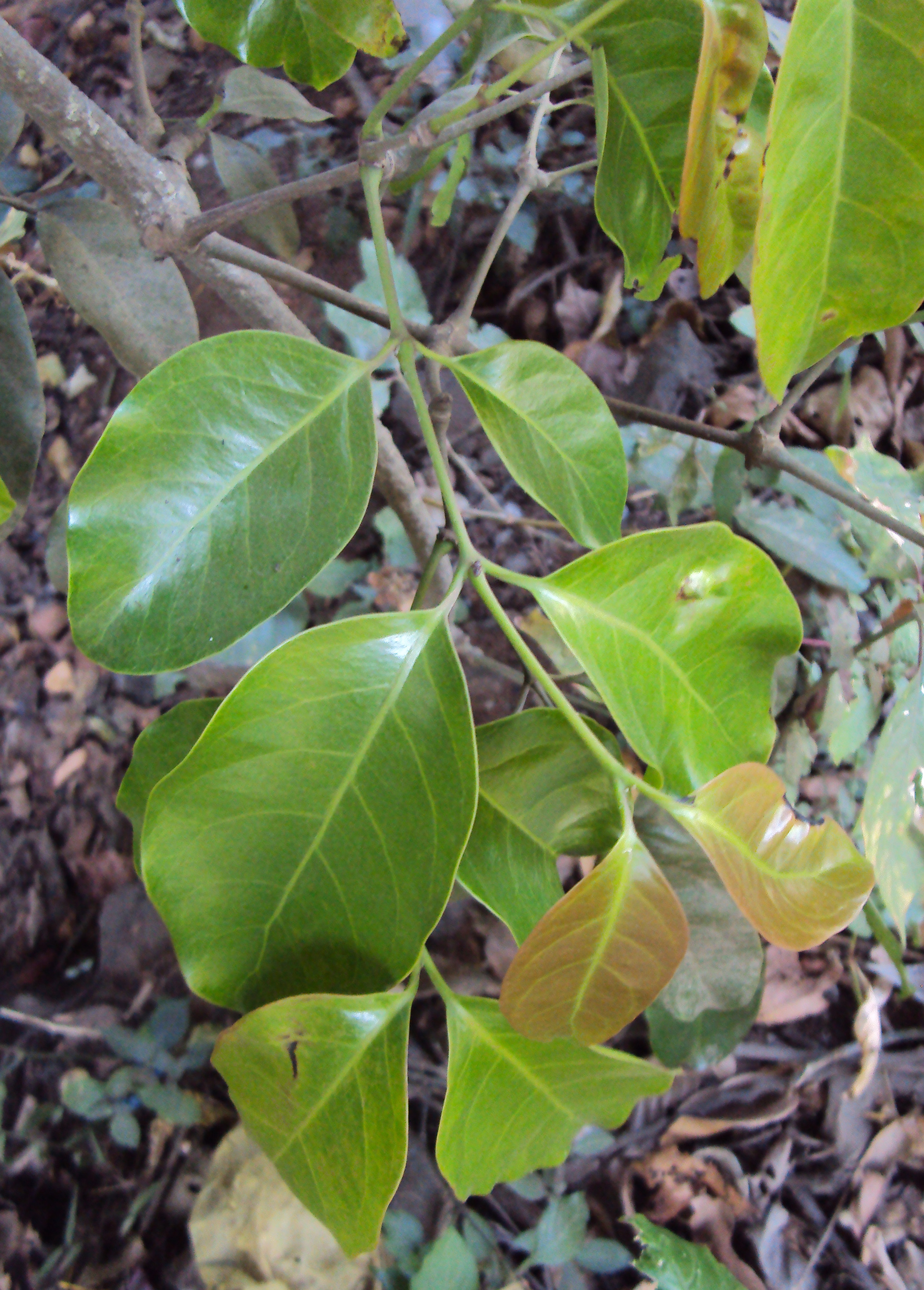
Gnetum latifolium leaves

Gnetum latifolium is an evergreen plant in the family Gnetaceae with a broad distribution across South East Asia. Although some of its habitat is threatened by logging and forest conversion to crops, its broad distribution afforded it an assessment of "least concern" according to The IUCN Red List of Threatened Species.

Several varieties are accepted:

- Gnetum latifolium var. latifolium
- Gnetum latifolium var. funiculare Markgr.
- Gnetum latifolium var. laxifrutescens (Elmer) Markgr.
- Gnetum latifolium var. longipes (Markgr.) T.H.Nguyên
- Gnetum latifolium var. macropodum (Kurz) Markgr.
- Gnetum latifolium var. minus (Foxw.) Markgr.
