= Xenothictis oncodes =

Scientific classification
- Kingdom: Animalia
- Phylum: Arthropoda
- Class: Insecta
- Order: Lepidoptera
- Family: Tortricidae
- Genus: Xenothictis
- Species: X. oncodes

Binomial name
- Xenothictis oncodes Razowski, 2013

Species of moth

Xenothictis oncodes is a species of moth of the family Tortricidae. It is found in New Caledonia in the southwest Pacific Ocean. The habitat consists of rainforests.

The wingspan is 24–37 mm.
