= Xenothictis noctiflua =

Scientific classification
- Domain: Eukaryota
- Kingdom: Animalia
- Phylum: Arthropoda
- Class: Insecta
- Order: Lepidoptera
- Family: Tortricidae
- Genus: Xenothictis
- Species: X. noctiflua

Binomial name
- Xenothictis noctiflua Diakonoff, 1961

Species of moth

Xenothictis noctiflua is a species of moth of the family Tortricidae. It is found on Vanuatu in the South Pacific Ocean.
