= Xenothictis =

Scientific classification
- Domain: Eukaryota
- Kingdom: Animalia
- Phylum: Arthropoda
- Class: Insecta
- Order: Lepidoptera
- Family: Tortricidae
- Tribe: Archipini
- Genus: Xenothictis; Meyrick, 1910

Synonyms
- Xeneda Diakonoff, 1961; Barnardiella Turner, 1925

Genus of tortrix moths

Xenothictis is a genus of moths belonging to the subfamily Tortricinae of the family Tortricidae.

== Species ==
- Xenothictis atriflora Meyrick, 1930
- Xenothictis coena (Diakonoff, 1961)
- Xenothictis dagnyana Razowski, 2013
- Xenothictis gnetivora Brown, Miller & Horak, 2003
- Xenothictis noctiflua Diakonoff, 1961
- Xenothictis oncodes Razowski, 2013
- Xenothictis paragona Meyrick, 1910
- Xenothictis sciaphila (Turner, 1925)
- Xenothictis semiota Meyrick, 1910
- Xenothictis sympaestra Razowski, 2013

== See also ==
- List of Tortricidae genera
