= Gnetum oblongum =

Conservation status
- Near Threatened (IUCN 3.1)

Scientific classification
- Kingdom: Plantae
- Clade: Embryophytes
- Clade: Tracheophytes
- Clade: Gymnosperms
- Division: Pinophyta
- Class: Pinopsida
- Subclass: Gnetidae
- Order: Gnetales
- Family: Gnetaceae
- Genus: Gnetum
- Species: G. oblongum

Binomial name
- Gnetum oblongum Markgr.

Species of plant

Gnetum oblongum is a species of gymnosperm in the family Gnetaceae. It is an evergreen climbing plant with woody, twining stems. It was first described by Friedrich Markgraf in 1930. They are native to the wet tropical lowlands of Bangladesh and Myanmar. The species is classified as Near Threatened in the IUCN Red List.
