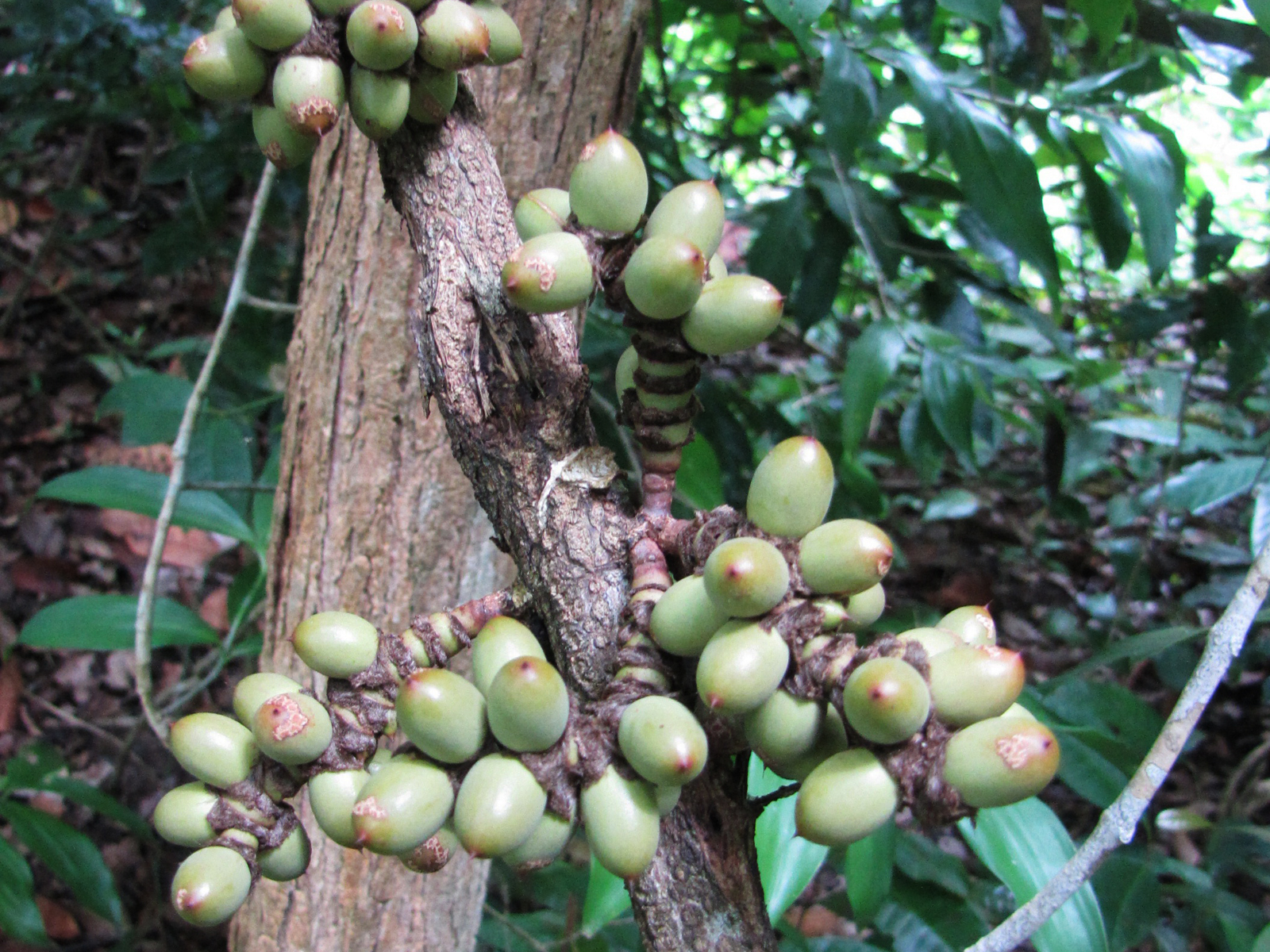

Conservation status
- Least Concern (IUCN 3.1)

Scientific classification
- Kingdom: Plantae
- Clade: Embryophytes
- Clade: Tracheophytes
- Clade: Spermatophytes
- Clade: Gymnosperms
- Division: Pinophyta
- Class: Pinopsida
- Subclass: Gnetidae
- Order: Gnetales
- Family: Gnetaceae
- Genus: Gnetum
- Species: G. macrostachyum

Binomial name
- Gnetum macrostachyum Hook.f.

= Gnetum macrostachyum =

Species of seed-bearing vine

Gnetum macrostachyum is a species of vine gymnosperm, native to tropical Asia. They are often harvested as a source of fiber.

== Description ==
The Gnetum species is from the vine gymnosperm. Species number about 40 within this family. They feature decussate leaves, vessels in stems similar to angiosperms. They are overall dioecious pollen spreaders. G. macrostachyum is an evergreen climbing plant that has twining stems.

It is harvested for use as food and a source of fibre.

This plant is widely distributed, and is protected in various countries and islands. It is mainly located in East Asia in places such as Thailand, Cambodia, Indonesia and even New Guinea.

It usually grows in environments such as humid tropical rainforests, preferably by rivers on red or black soil, and usually at low elevations.

== Uses ==
They produce red fruits, with seeds edible after roasting. The bark fibers are known for making ropes. G. macrostachyum is usually only harvested when it is abundant, only because this plant poses no direct threat to any species.

Related species G. gnemon can be used for most/all of the same purposes as G. macrostachyum.

== Threats ==
This species is threatened due to habitat loss. Montane forests tend to be more intact as a habitat, but in the lower parts of Sumatra and Java the species is endangered. To prevent extermination, many G. macrostachyum specimens have been planted in protected areas of parks.
