= Xenothictis sciaphila =

Scientific classification
- Domain: Eukaryota
- Kingdom: Animalia
- Phylum: Arthropoda
- Class: Insecta
- Order: Lepidoptera
- Family: Tortricidae
- Genus: Xenothictis
- Species: X. sciaphila

Binomial name
- Xenothictis sciaphila (Turner, 1925)

Synonyms
- Barnardiella sciaphila Turner, 1925

Species of moth

Xenothictis sciaphila is a species of moth of the family Tortricidae. It is found in Australia, where it has been recorded from Queensland and New South Wales.

The wingspan is about 25 mm for males and 31.5 mm for females.
