= Xenothictis dagnyana =

Scientific classification
- Kingdom: Animalia
- Phylum: Arthropoda
- Class: Insecta
- Order: Lepidoptera
- Family: Tortricidae
- Genus: Xenothictis
- Species: X. dagnyana

Binomial name
- Xenothictis dagnyana Razowski, 2013

Species of moth

Xenothictis dagnyana is a species of moth of the family Tortricidae. It is found in New Caledonia.

The wingspan is about 29 mm.
