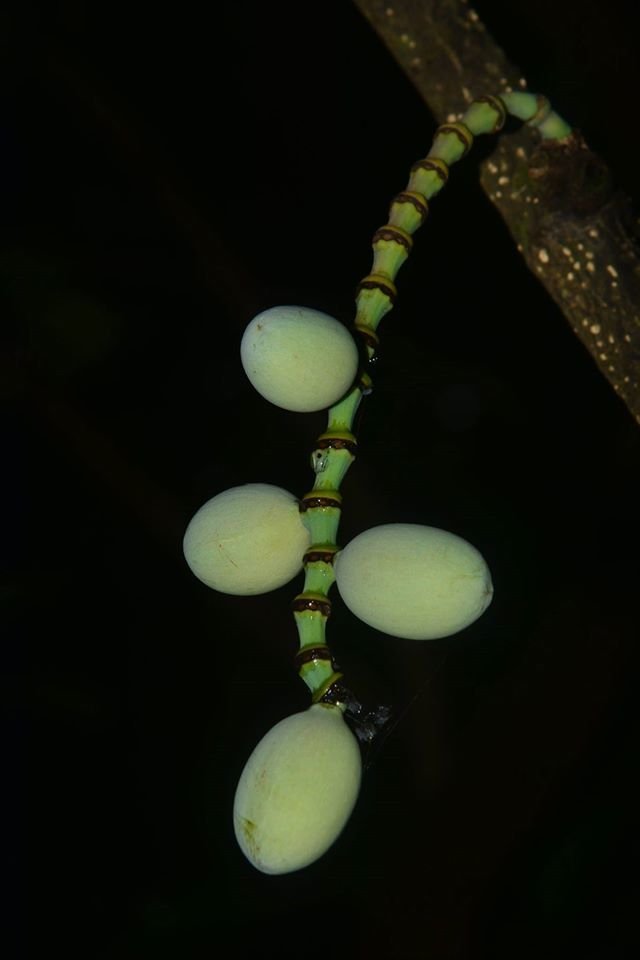

Conservation status
- Least Concern (IUCN 3.1)

Scientific classification
- Kingdom: Plantae
- Clade: Tracheophytes
- Clade: Gymnosperms
- Division: Pinophyta
- Class: Pinopsida
- Subclass: Gnetidae
- Order: Gnetales
- Family: Gnetaceae
- Genus: Gnetum
- Species: G. edule

Binomial name
- Gnetum edule (Willd.) Blume

Synonyms
- Homotypic: ≡Gnetum edulis (Willd.) Kuntze; ≡Gnetum scandens Roxb.; ≡Gnetum ula Brongn.; ≡Thoa edulis Willd.; ≡Gnetum funiculare Buch.-Ham. ex Sm.; ≡Thoa scandens (Roxb.) Doweld; Heterotypic: =Gnetum funiculare Blume; =Gnetum pyrifolium Miq. ex Parl.

= Gnetum edule =

Species of plant

Gnetum edule is an evergreen, woody, dioecious, climbing vine that is primarily native to the tropical forests of Southern India between 100 and 1,500 meters of elevation. The seeds are locally used as food and in medicine.

== Description ==
An evergreen woody vine. Stems with swollen nodes. Leaves opposite, stalked, simple, pinnately veined, margin entire. Flowers unisexual, borne in whorled, spike-like cones, arranged in lax, cymes. Male spikes have collars closely arranged and ± hiding axis (less often somewhat laxly arranged), each collar with 20–80 flowers, often also with a whorl of sterile female flowers, apical whorl with sterile female flowers only. Female spikes are solitary or several in a panicle, often cauliflorous; involucral collars widely separated, each with 4–12 flowers. Seeds drupelike, enclosed in a red, orange, or yellow, fleshy (rarely corky) false seed coat. New leaves appear in March, flowers in March–April and fruits from April onwards, ripening yellow in November.

== Distribution ==
G. edule is one of 7 Gnetum species found in India. It grows primarily in the wet tropical biomes in southwest and southeastern India. It is found in the North Western Ghats montane rain forests, South Deccan Plateau dry deciduous forests, and Malabar Coast moist forests ecoregions. It has also been reported from the Andaman & Nicobar Islands and southern Myanmar.

== Etymology ==
The genus name Gnetum likely derives from the Moluccan name of the tree, ganema. The species epithet edule is derived from the latin word 'ĕdūlis', meaning edible.

In English it is sometimes called jointfir, though this name is shared by several species within the Gnetophyta division. Additionally, it may also be called monkey's bridge, but this too is shared across several unrelated vining species in India with medicinal importance. In the Western and Eastern Ghats, it is known locally as lollodu teega. In Kannada it is known as kumtibeeja, kodkamballi, 'avuru katte' (ನವುರು ಕಟ್ಟೆ), or kumti beeja. In Malayalam it is known as nowukatte or odal. In Odiya it is called lolori or lolorimal. In Telugu it may be called apajuttili, kaloi, loluga tige, or luliti.

== Uses ==
As with most species of Gnetum, the seeds are edible and usually consumed after roasting. The seeds can also produce an oil that is used for medicine or burning.

In the Kodaikanal region, the local people extract oil from the seeds of G. edule and use it for burning lamps made from soil. In Chatnoor, where local people use the seeds of G. edule for as a fish poison due to their piscicidal property.

== Gallery ==
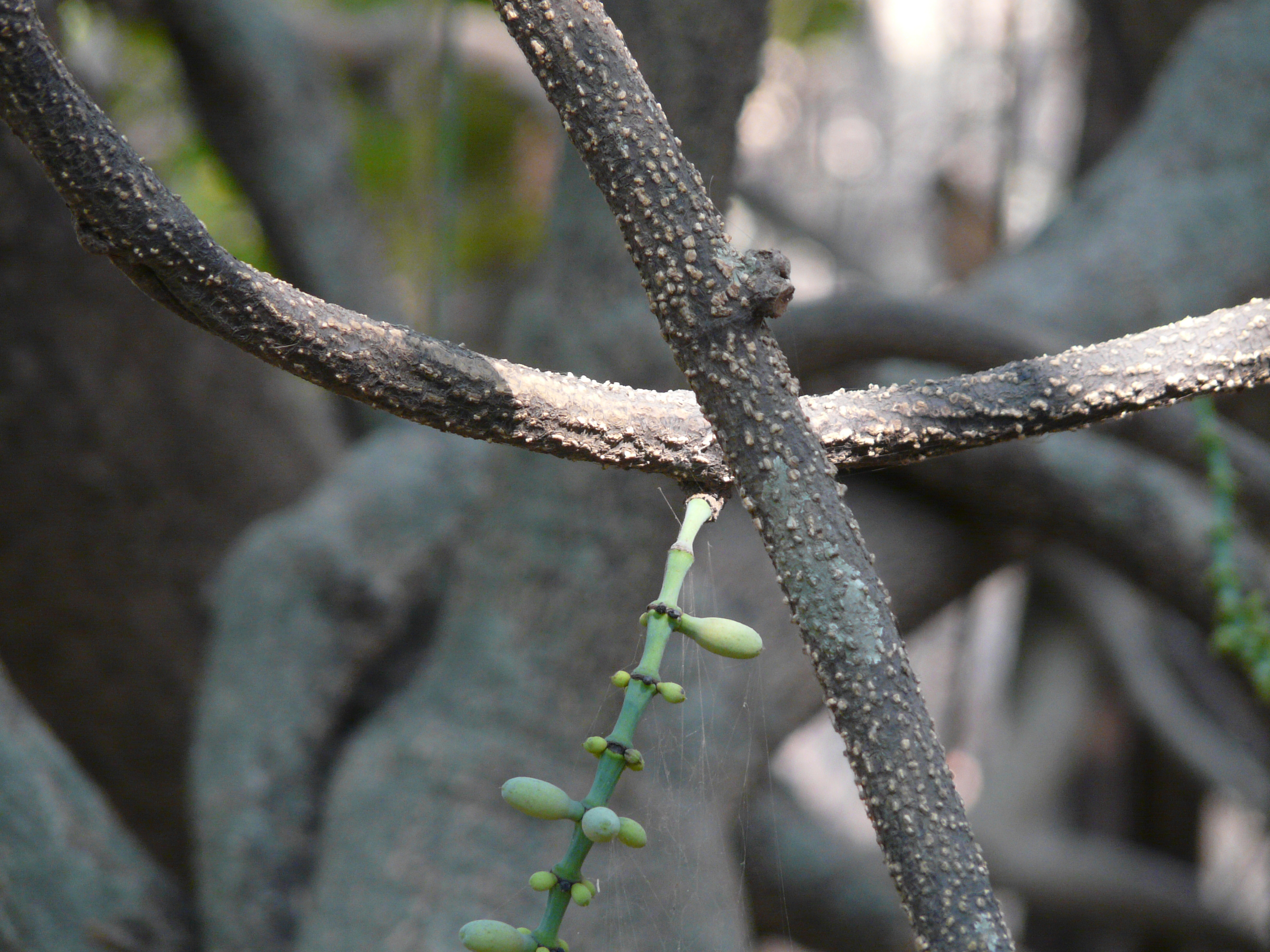
Anapendu (Tamil) with young fruit

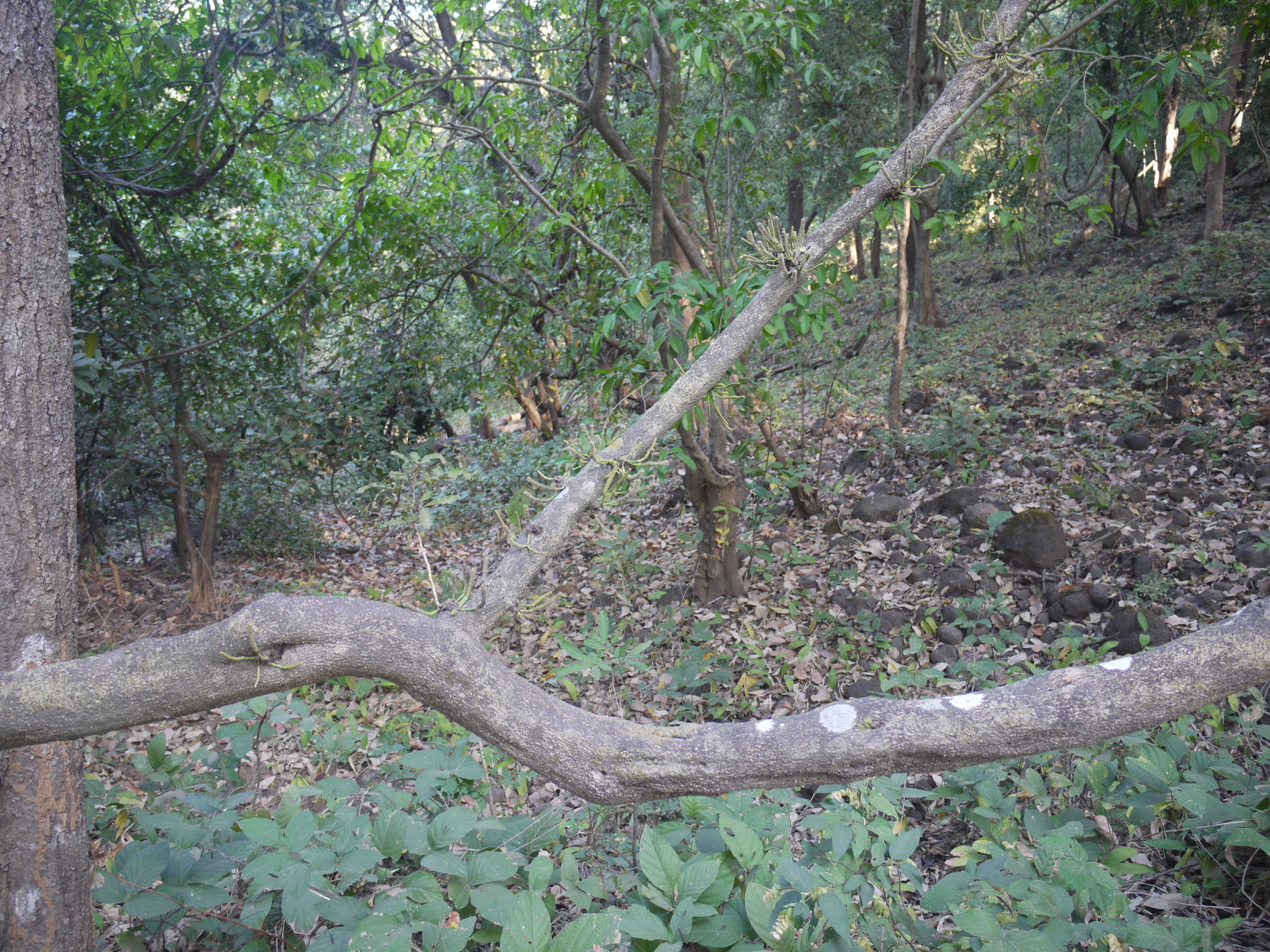
Male reproductive parts

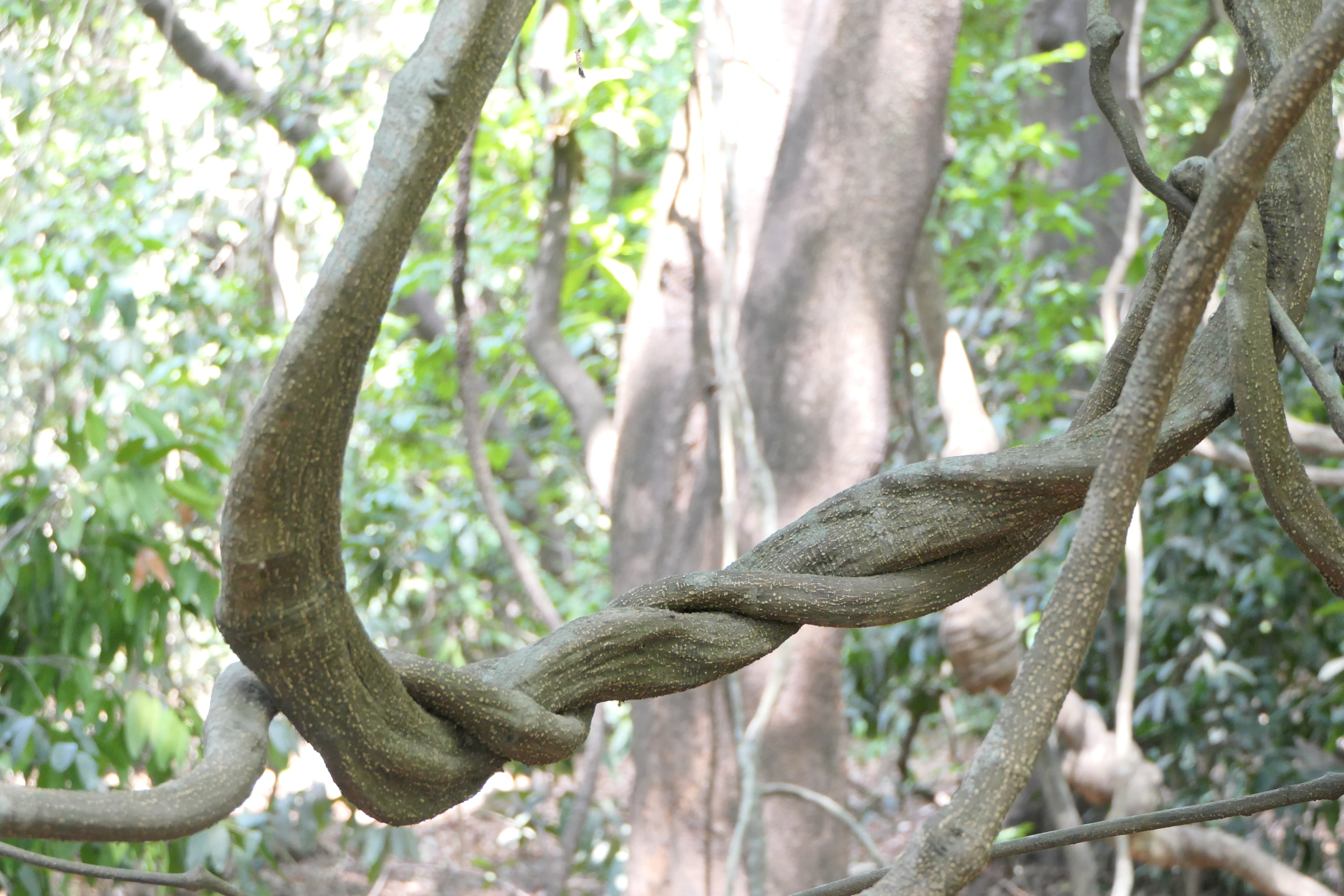
A twisted, woody G. edule vine

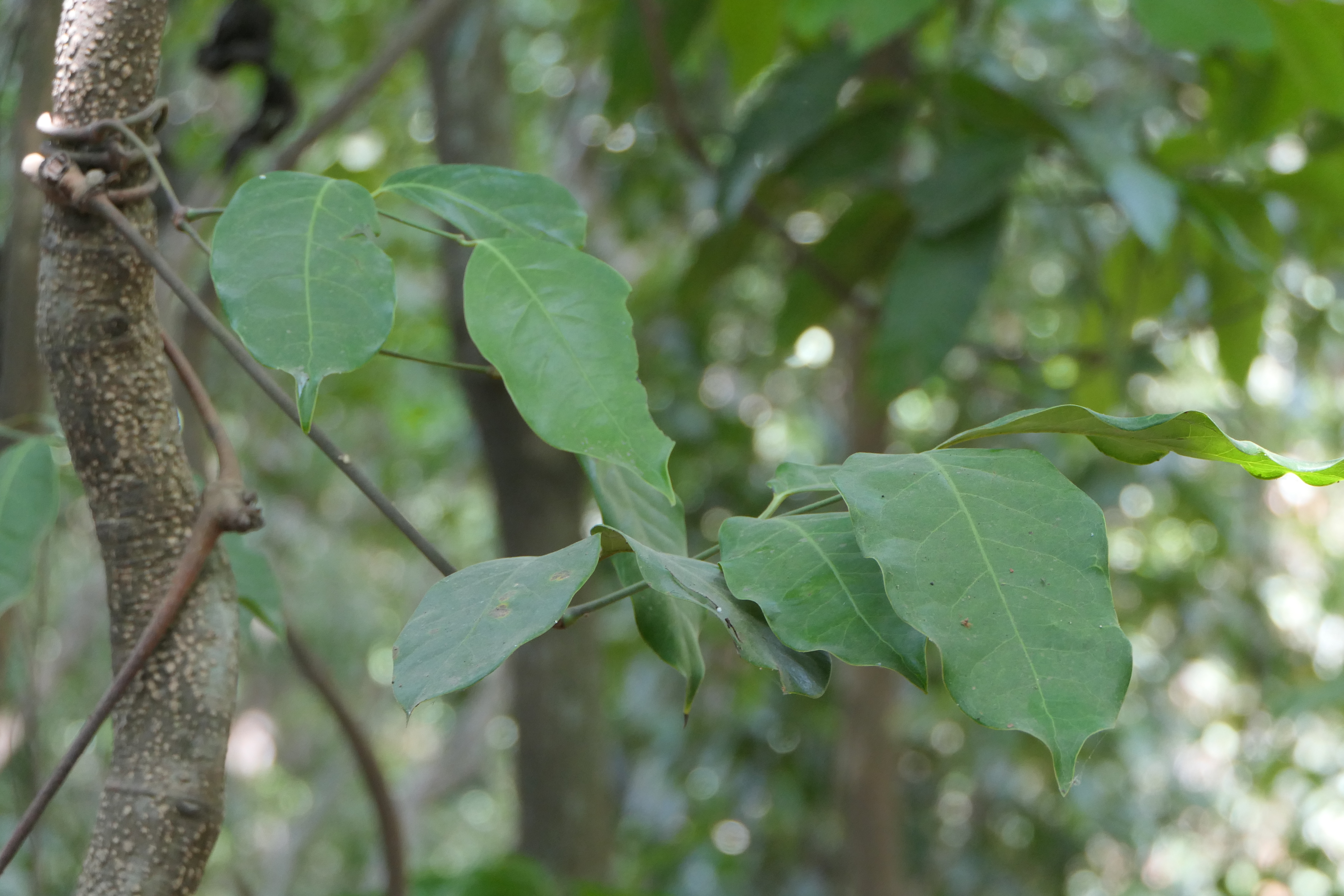
G. edule leaves

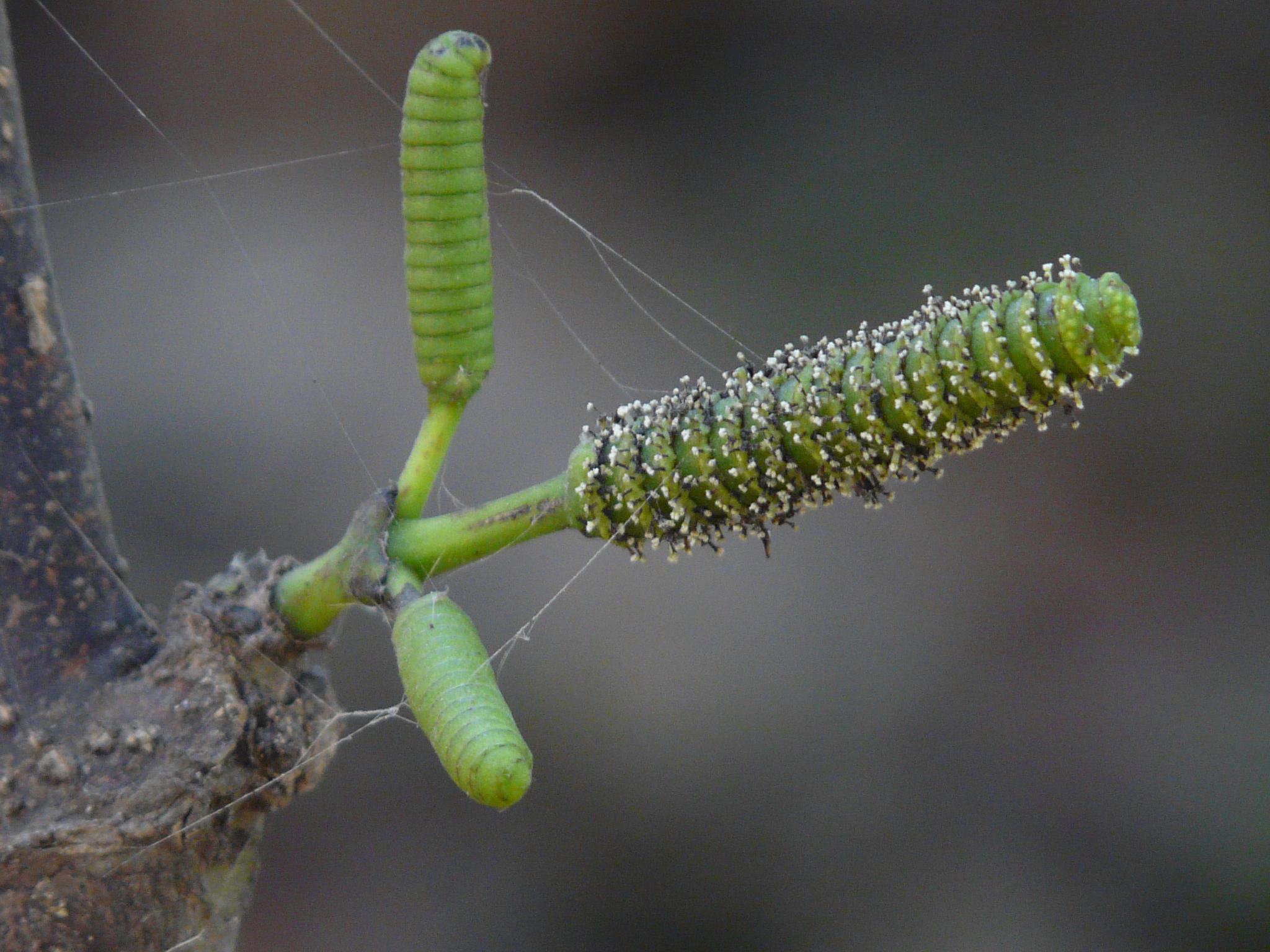
Closeup of pollen-producing parts
