= Xenothictis sympaestra =

Scientific classification
- Kingdom: Animalia
- Phylum: Arthropoda
- Class: Insecta
- Order: Lepidoptera
- Family: Tortricidae
- Genus: Xenothictis
- Species: X. sympaestra

Binomial name
- Xenothictis sympaestra Razowski, 2013

Species of moth

Xenothictis sympaestra is a species of moth of the family Tortricidae. It is found in New Caledonia in the southwest Pacific Ocean. The habitat consists of rainforests.

The wingspan is about 20 mm.
