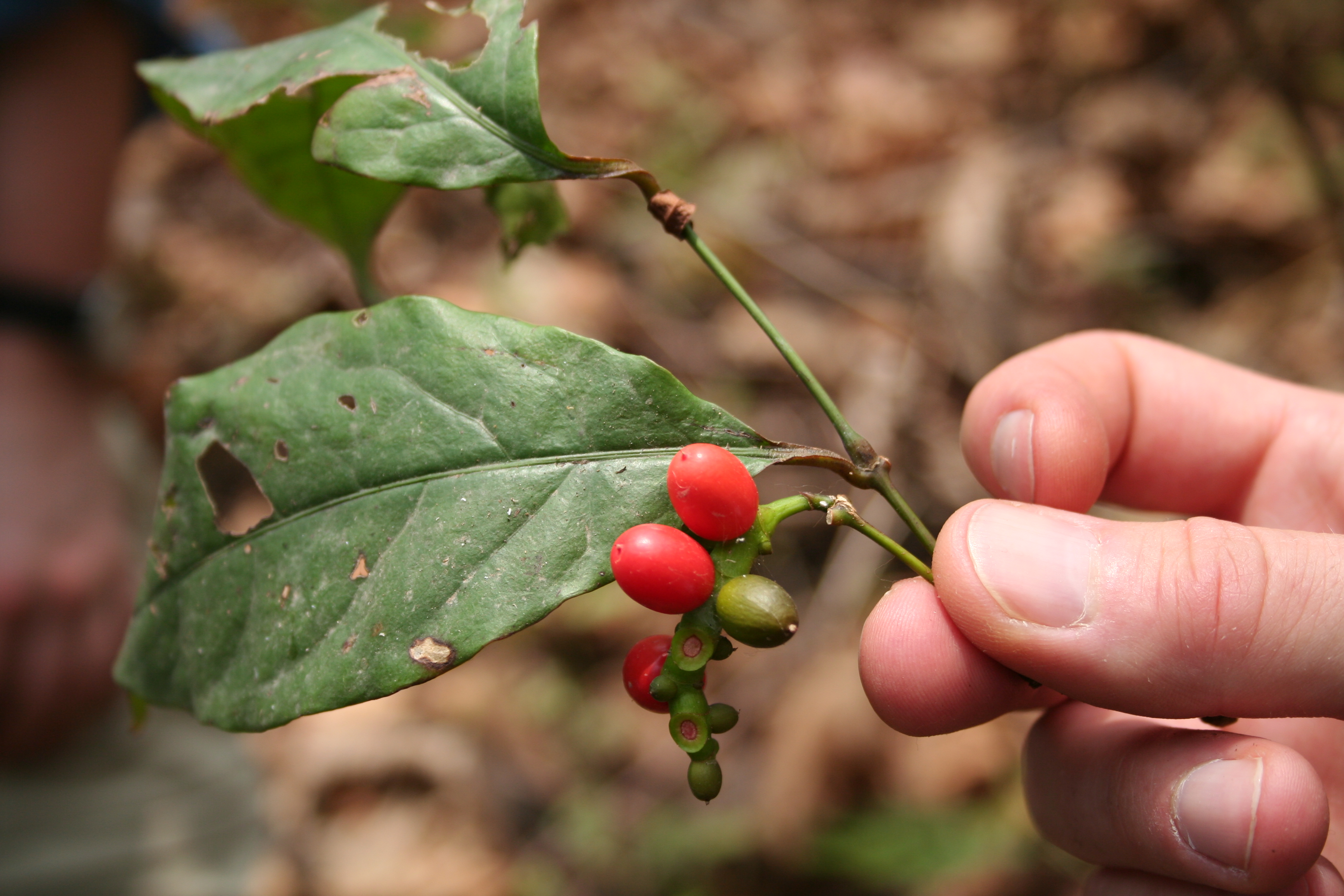
- Gnetum africanum, from the coastal rainforest of Cameroon.

Conservation status
- Near Threatened (IUCN 3.1)

Scientific classification
- Kingdom: Plantae
- Clade: Embryophytes
- Clade: Tracheophytes
- Clade: Spermatophytes
- Clade: Gymnosperms
- Division: Pinophyta
- Class: Pinopsida
- Subclass: Gnetidae
- Order: Gnetales
- Family: Gnetaceae
- Genus: Gnetum
- Species: G. africanum

Binomial name
- Gnetum africanum Welw.

Synonyms
- Thoa africana (Welw.) Doweld

= Gnetum africanum =

Species of seed-bearing plant

Gnetum africanum (eru or African jointfir) is a species of vine native to tropical Africa. Though bearing leaves, the genus Gnetum are gymnosperms, related to pine and other conifers.

Gnetum africanum has numerous common names and is grown in various countries across Africa, including: Cameroon (Eru, okok, m'fumbua, or fumbua), Angola (KoKo), Nigeria (ukazi, "okazi", in Igbo or afang in Efik and Ibibio), Gabon (Nkumu), Central African Republic (KoKo), Congo (KoKo), and the Democratic Republic of Congo (m'fumbua or fumbua). Gnetum africanum has also been referred to as a form of 'wild spinach' in English.

== Description ==
Gnetum africanum is traditionally a wild vine and is considered to be a wild vegetable. It is a perennial that grows approximately 10 metres long, with thick papery-like leaves growing in groups of three. The leaves may grow approximately 8 cm long, and at maturity the vine will produce small cone-like reproductive structures. The seeds of the vine resemble a fleshy fruit, sized 10–15 mm × 4–8 mm, and are red-orange in colour when fully ripe.

== Taxonomy ==
Gnetum africanum may also be known as G. buchholzianum, and is one of the two vine species from the Gnetum genus that grown in Africa. There are currently no gene banks for Gnetum africanum, but approximately 19 varieties of the species have been planted in Cameroon's Limbe Botanic Garden to begin a gene bank.

== Distribution and habitat ==
Gnetum africanum is found mainly in the humid tropical forest regions of Central African Republic, Cameroon, Nigeria, Gabon, Republic of the Congo, Democratic Republic of the Congo and Angola. It has been found in primary and secondary semi-deciduous humid forests, both in dense and sunny transitional savannah locations, ranging from sea-level to 1200 meter altitude. The shade tolerant vine does not grow well in direct sunlight and can be found climbing on middle and under-story trees.

This vine will grow in all seasons and typically spreads along forest floors. The vine grows in two ways: through rhizomes, or through new shoots that grow where the stem has been cut. As Gnetum africanum is a wild forest vine, it tends to grow best in shaded areas. Input requirements for Gnetum africanum have not yet been established, and nutrient requirements are currently unknown as well. This is likely due to the fact that the vine is traditionally a wild vegetable. The plant has now been domesticated and grown for subsistence and commercial use among the Ibibio, Efik and Annang people of Nigeria. However, it has been noted that the vine grows best in well-shaded areas similar to that of a forest, as too much sunlight can burn the vine and produce substandard leaves for selling purposes. It has also been noted that the vine does not grow particularly well in very moist conditions such as marshes and swamps.

== Ecology ==
Gnetum africanum has been found to be negatively impacted if grown on or next to termite infected wood or trees. However, the productivity of the vine appears to be resistant to a significant proportion of diseases. The vine is largely understudied, and more research is needed to verify plant susceptibility and resilience to viruses, diseases, and fungi. Gnetum africanum depletion is largely associated with tree felling and overexploitative forestry practices. Overexploitation is partly caused by unsustainable forest clearing practices throughout regions in Africa.

== Cultivation ==
Since Gnetum africanum grows best in shaded areas it could be used as a complementary crop on tree farms. Specifically, it has been suggested that the vine could be used as a complementary crop for rubber and oil trees. However, the necessity for shaded, but not excessively moist, conditions may make it difficult for poor farmers to grow Gnetum africanum if they lack access to suitable lands. However, since Gnetum africanum grows via rhizomes it is not labour-intensive, therefore allowing farmers to focus physical capital elsewhere.

Sustainable cultivation practices, such as harvesting the leaves regularly rather than uprooting the whole vine, allows for a more viable supplementary income throughout the year. The FAO has found that the vine is easier to reproduce by cuttings than by growing from seeds.

The Centre for International Forestry Research (CIFOR) has been working with women to create sustainable cultivation practices of Gnetum africanum, as well as forest restoration techniques. Specifically, near Lekie, Cameroon, CIFOR has been helping the women remove an invasive plant species (kodengui), and replacing it with Gnetum africanum, in order to discourage regrowth of the invasive species and utilize the area for a more sustainable resource.

== Uses ==
Subsistence agriculturalists in Cameroon may be able to improve their nutritional, environmental, social, and economic situations by growing this vine. Nutrition can be improved by using the plant for medicinal purposes as well as through edible consumption. Primarily, Gnetum africanum leaves are used as a vegetable for soups and stews, commonly called eru soup, okazi soup or afang soup. The leaves of the vine are sold in markets throughout the year and may be used in soups and stews or eaten raw. The leaves may further be used as a remedy for nausea, sore throats, or as a dressing for warts. The stem of the plant may also be eaten for medicinal purposes, including the reduction of pain during childbirth. Furthermore, Gnetum africanum produces a root tuber that may be used as a source of famine food, and is similar to that of a yam. Finally, the seeds of the vine may also be eaten cooked.

Gnetum africanum is a good source of protein and is strong in essential and non-essential amino acids. It is high in glutamic acid, leucine, and aspartic acid, with low levels of histidine, and cysteine, while there appears to be trace amounts of tryptophan in the plant. The content of amino acids found in Gnetum africanum is similar to recommended levels by the FAO. It has also been found that the levels of iodine are also high in the vine. Fibre levels average approximately 33.4 g/100 g of dried Gnetum africanum leaves, while recommended daily intake of fibre is 30 g. Gnetum africanum has been noted as an anti-inflammatory, anticarcinogenic and antioxidant.

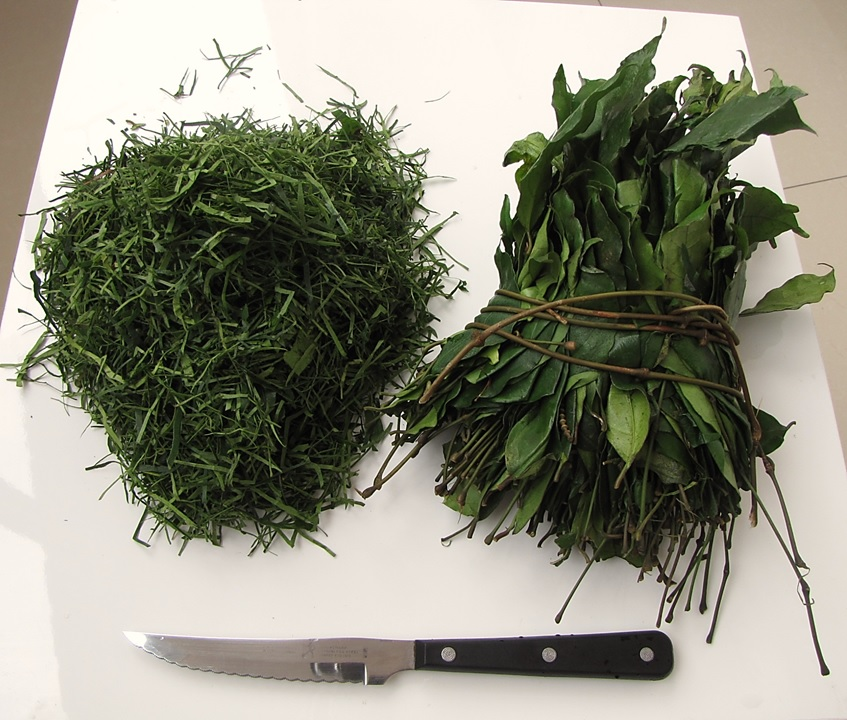
Gnetum africanum - leaves as sold and as typically cut for recipes

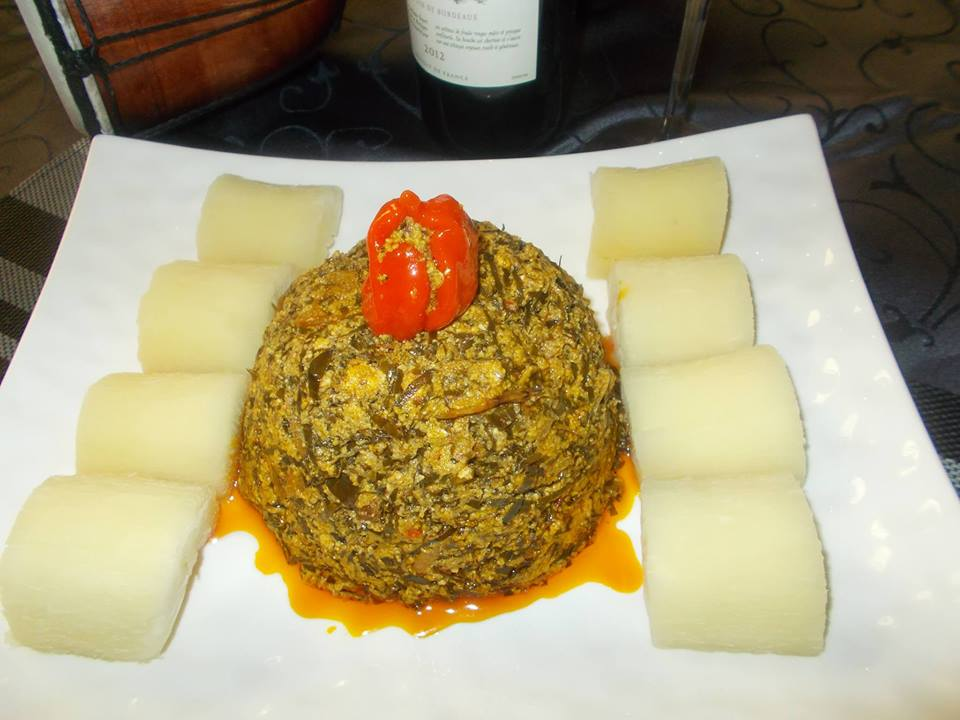
Gnetum africanum cooked with cassava

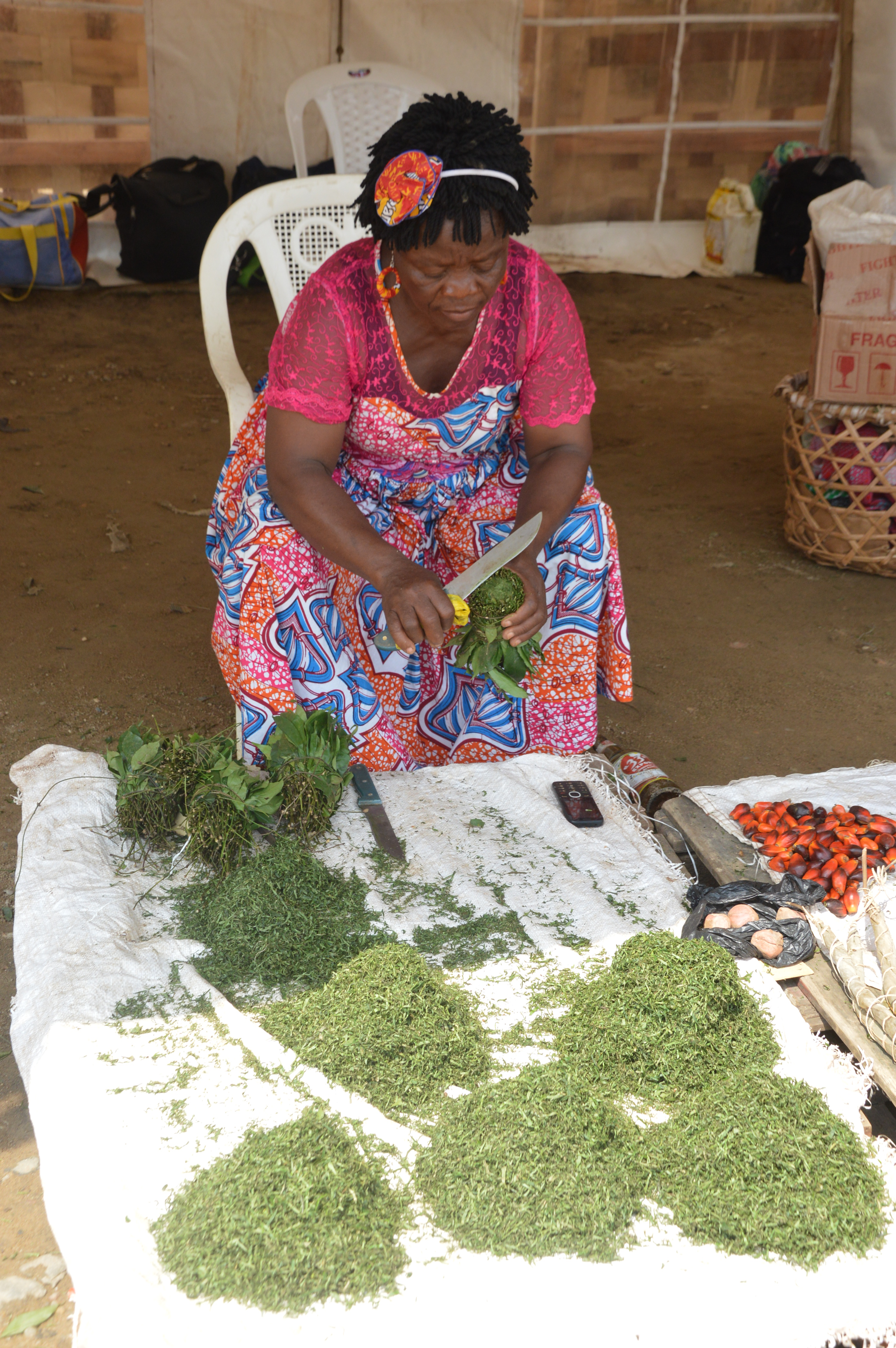
A woman selling Eru leaves for income

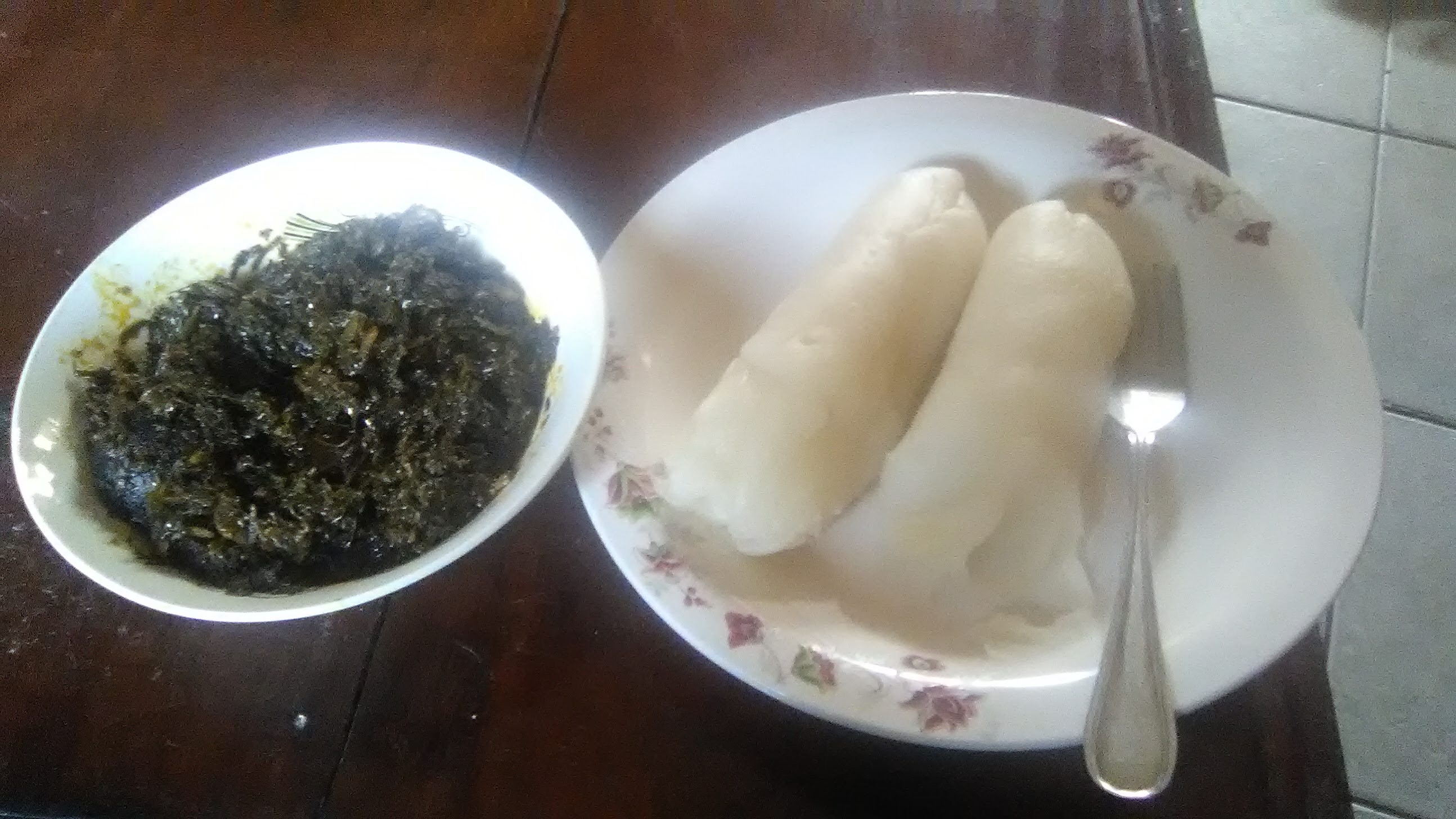
Water fufu and Eru soup ready for lunch

Economically, Gnetum africanum can be used as a means to maintain a supplemental income as it is available throughout the year, and may be used as a form of supplementary income for rural farmers in Cameroon. Healthy leaves with a thick wax-like texture are preferred in markets and will receive the highest value; Gnetum africanum remains untaxed in local markets. Since the leaves may be consumed as a vegetable and the root tuber as a famine food, it may also increase overall food security of rural households.

== Culture ==
Gnetum africanum is most significantly cultivated by rural women farmers, constituting approximately 80% of the overall trade of this crop. While Gnetum africanum is still largely considered a wild vegetable, if cultivated as a domesticated crop it may save time for women who previously would search for it in the forests.
