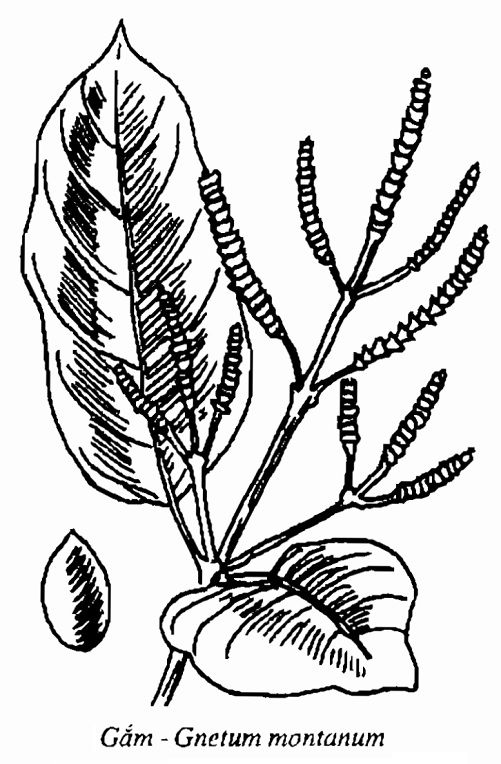

Conservation status
- Least Concern (IUCN 3.1)
- CITES Appendix III

Scientific classification
- Kingdom: Plantae
- Clade: Tracheophytes
- Clade: Gymnosperms
- Division: Pinophyta
- Class: Pinopsida
- Subclass: Gnetidae
- Order: Gnetales
- Family: Gnetaceae
- Genus: Gnetum
- Species: G. montanum

Binomial name
- Gnetum montanum Markgr.

= Gnetum montanum =

Species of plant

Gnetum montanum is a species of gymnosperm in the family Gnetaceae that grows as an evergreen liana or woody vine, native to subtropical forests across Asia, including regions of China, South Asia and Southeast Asia.

== Description ==
Gnetum montanum is an evergreen woody climber that can grow up to 10 meters long. The leaves are simple, opposite, and have an ovate or elliptic-oblong shape, with a widely rounded base. The cones are unisexual and borne on primarily or secondarily branching rachises within axillary inflorescences, with the plant being dioecious. The male inflorescence contains 20 to 25 flowers, while the female inflorescence has 5 to 8 flowers, with basal hairs that are sparse in comparison.

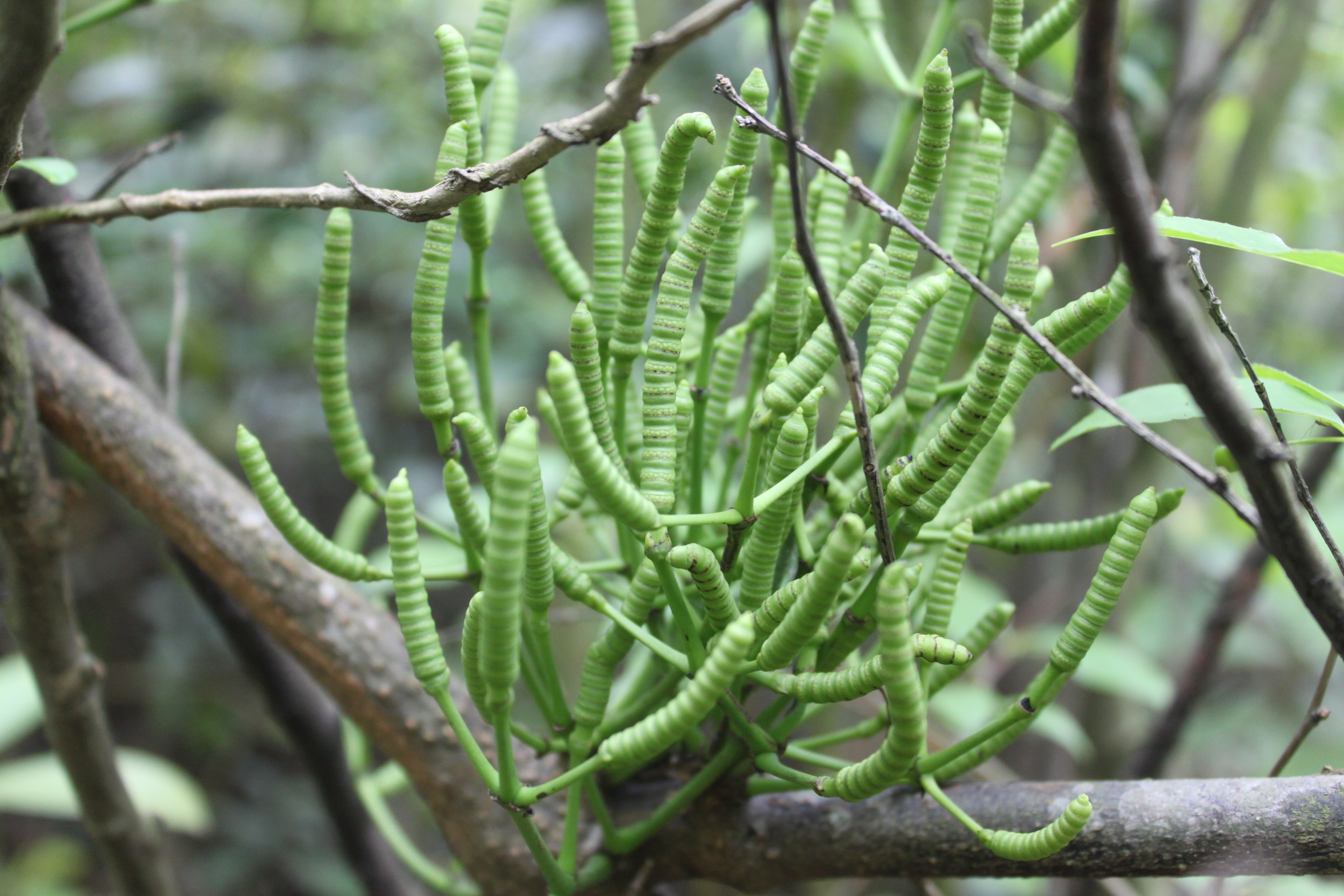
Cones of a tropical vine in Shenzhen, China

G. montanum propagates through seeds and is cultivated in tropical conditions with partial shade. The seeds vary in shape from ovoid to oblong and are approximately 2.5 centimeters long. They can be yellowish-brown to reddish-brown, often covered with silvery scales, and may have short stipes at the base or none at all. They pollinate from April to June, and the seeds mature from August to October.

== Taxonomy ==
Friedrich Markgraf first described Gnetum montanum in 1930, based on 43 variable syntypes collected from a broad geographic range. The original protologue of G. montanum most likely included representatives of more than one species, which caused confusion and uncertainty. To clarify the identification, in 1999, researchers defined G. montanum by specific morphological characteristics, such as male involucral collars that contain fewer microsporangia and small, stipitate seeds. They designated the syntype Kerr 602 from Thailand as the lectotype, conserving the name G. montanum.

== Habitat and distribution ==
Gnetum montanum is found in subtropical broadleaf rainforests, often near riverbanks, as well as in evergreen and mixed deciduous forests at elevations typically exceed 1,000 meters, reaching up to 2,700 meters. It occurs in sandy loam soil and in association with bamboo.

G. montanum is native to the Andaman Islands and Assam in India, Chittagong in Bangladesh, Bhutan, Cambodia, South, Southeast, and Central China, the East Himalayas, Laos, Myanmar, Nepal, Thailand, and Vietnam.

== Uses ==
The fibers from the bark of Gnetum montanum are used to create gunny bags, ropes, and fishing nets. The seeds produce edible oil that can be eaten when fried or used to make wine. Also, the sap is used as a cold drink.

=== Traditional medicine ===
Gnetum montanum is a medicinal plant rich in stilbenes, traditionally used in Vietnam, China, and other Asian countries to treat inflammatory disorders. It is used to treat gouty arthritis in some parts of Asia. It is also used as a folk medicine in China for treatment of bronchitis. The plant is used in Vietnamese folk medicine to treat conditions such as gout and joint pain as well, which are associated with xanthine oxidase activity.

== Conservation ==
Gnetum montanum is classified as Least Concern in the IUCN Red List. It has an EDGE score of -8.07 and an Evolutionary Distinctiveness score of 6.23. It is classified as Appendix III in the Convention on International Trade in Endangered Species by Nepal.
