= Xenothictis atriflora =

Scientific classification
- Kingdom: Animalia
- Phylum: Arthropoda
- Class: Insecta
- Order: Lepidoptera
- Family: Tortricidae
- Genus: Xenothictis
- Species: X. atriflora

Binomial name
- Xenothictis atriflora Meyrick, 1930

Synonyms
- Tortrix melananchis Meyrick, 1933; Xenothictis melananchis (Meyrick, 1933)

Species of moth

Xenothictis atriflora is a species of moth of the family Tortricidae. It is found on Fiji.
