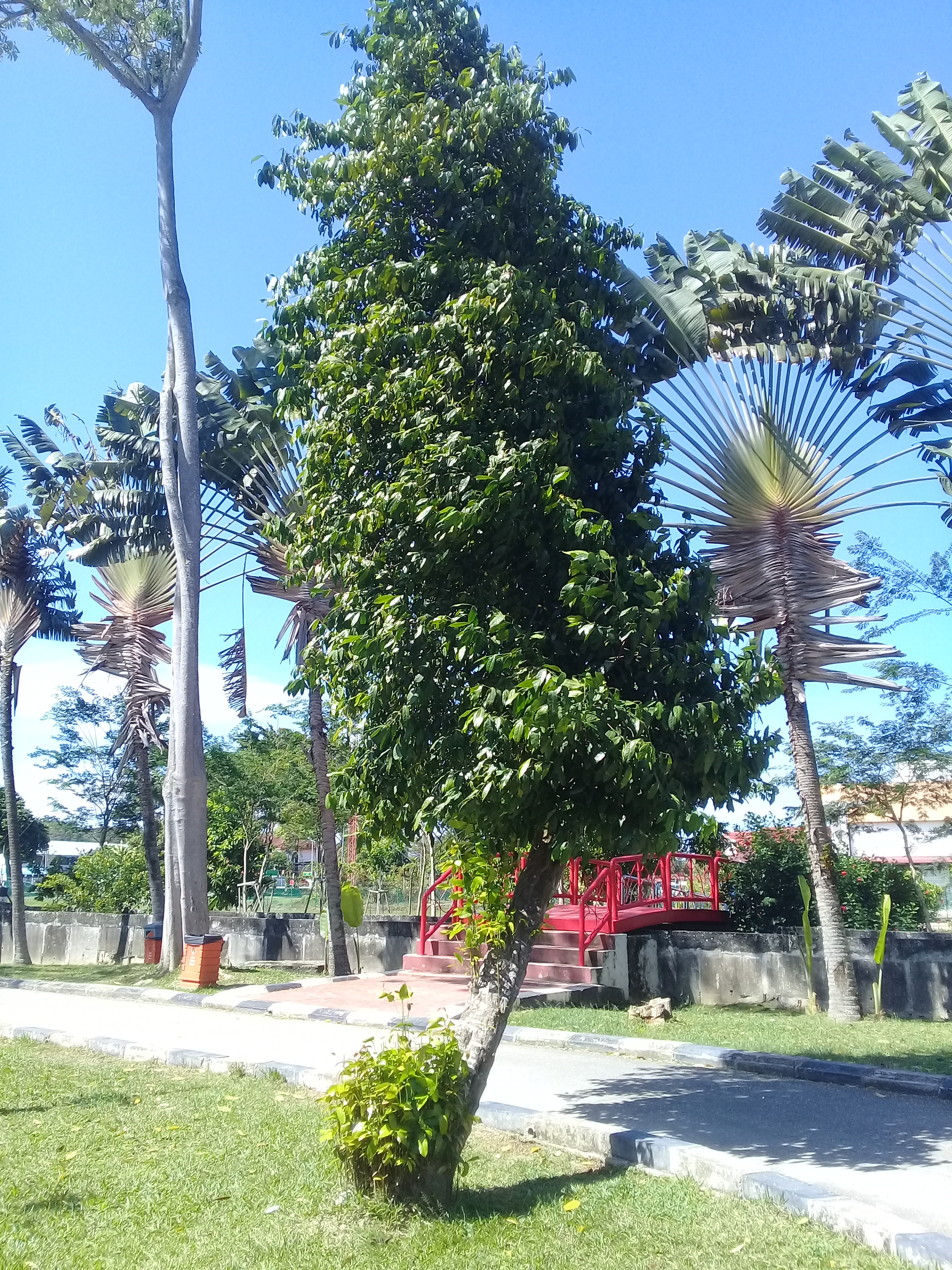

Conservation status
- Least Concern (IUCN 3.1)

Scientific classification
- Kingdom: Plantae
- Clade: Tracheophytes
- Clade: Gymnosperms
- Division: Pinophyta
- Class: Pinopsida
- Subclass: Gnetidae
- Order: Gnetales
- Family: Gnetaceae
- Genus: Gnetum
- Species: G. gnemon

Binomial name
- Gnetum gnemon L.

Synonyms
- Gnetum domesticum Reinw. ex E.A.Duchesne

= Gnetum gnemon =

Species of plant

Gnetum gnemon is a species of Gnetum, an unusual genus of gymnosperms. Its native area spans from Mizoram and Assam in India down south through Malay Peninsula, Malay Archipelago and the Philippines in southeast Asia to the western Pacific islands. Common names include gnetum, joint fir, two leaf, melinjo/belinjo (Indonesian), bago/lumbay (Filipino), hanthu (Karbi) and tulip (Tok Pisin).

== Description ==
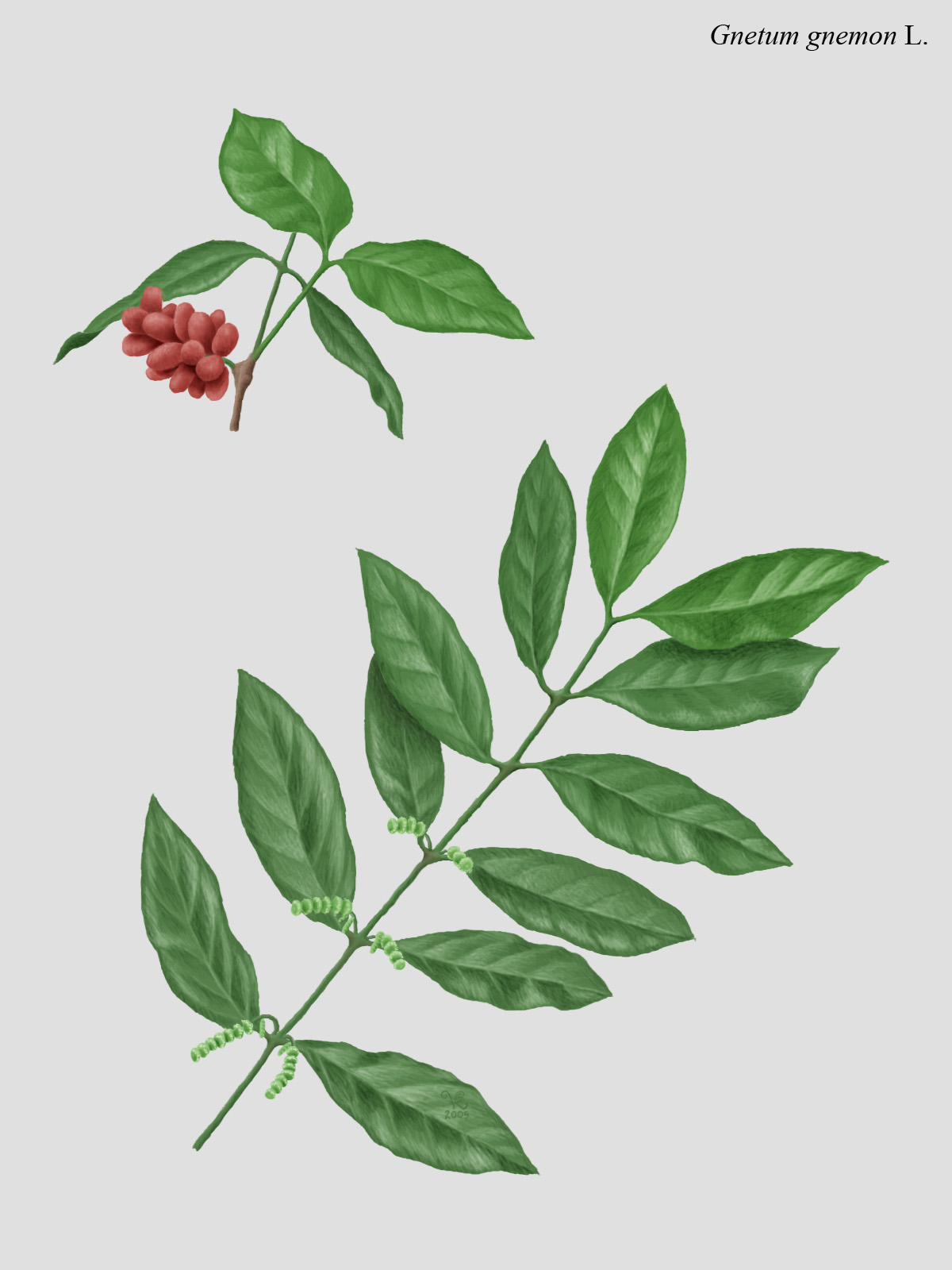
Melinjo (G. gnemon) branch with fruit

This species can be easily confused for an angiosperm due to the fruit-like female strobili, broad leaves and male strobili looking like flowers due to convergent evolution.

=== Tree ===
It is a small to medium-size tree (unlike most other Gnetum species, which are lianas), growing to 15–22 metres tall and with a trunk diameter of up to 40 cm (16 in). In addition to the tree form, there are also varieties that includes shrub forms (brunonianum, griffithii, and tenerum). The leaves are evergreen, opposite, 8–20 cm long and 3–10 cm broad, entire, emerging bronze-coloured, maturing glossy dark green.

The tree does not flower but still grow male and female sporing organs from single long stems 3–6 centimetres long. Male strobili are small and arranged in long stalks which are often mistaken for flowers, melinjo fruit instead are produced from fertilizing the female strobili.

=== Fruit ===
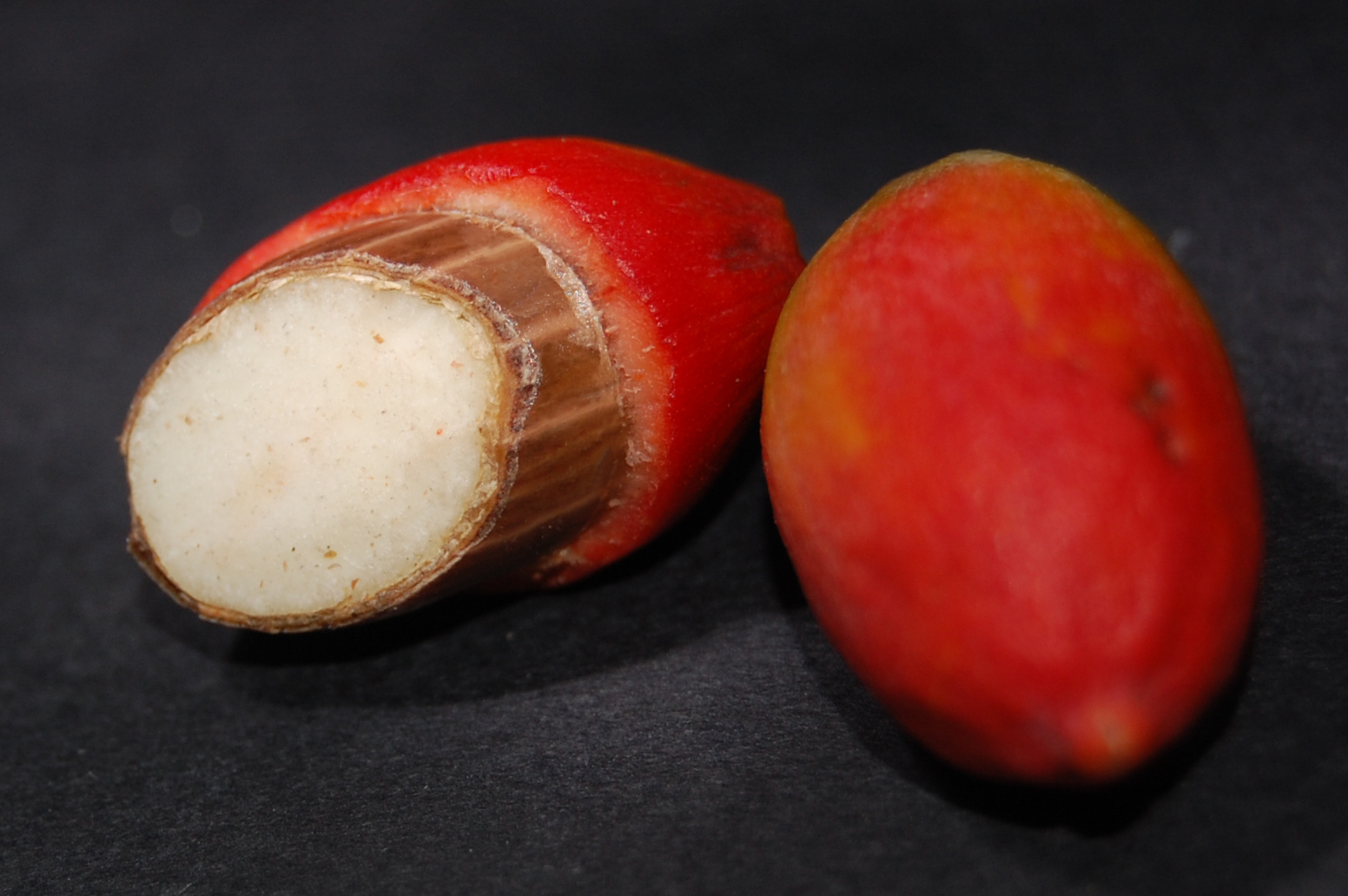
Cross section of a melinjo seed with endosperm inside.

The oval fruit (technically a seed) measures 1–3.5 cm long, it consists of a thin velvety integument and a large nut-like endosperm 2–4 cm long inside. Fleshy seeds weigh about 5.5 g, the endosperm alone 3.8 g. It changes colour from yellow to orange, purple or pink when ripe. Melinjo season in Indonesia comes three times in March to April, June to July, and September to October, but the fruiting season northeast in the Philippines is mainly from June to September.

== Uses ==
=== Culinary ===
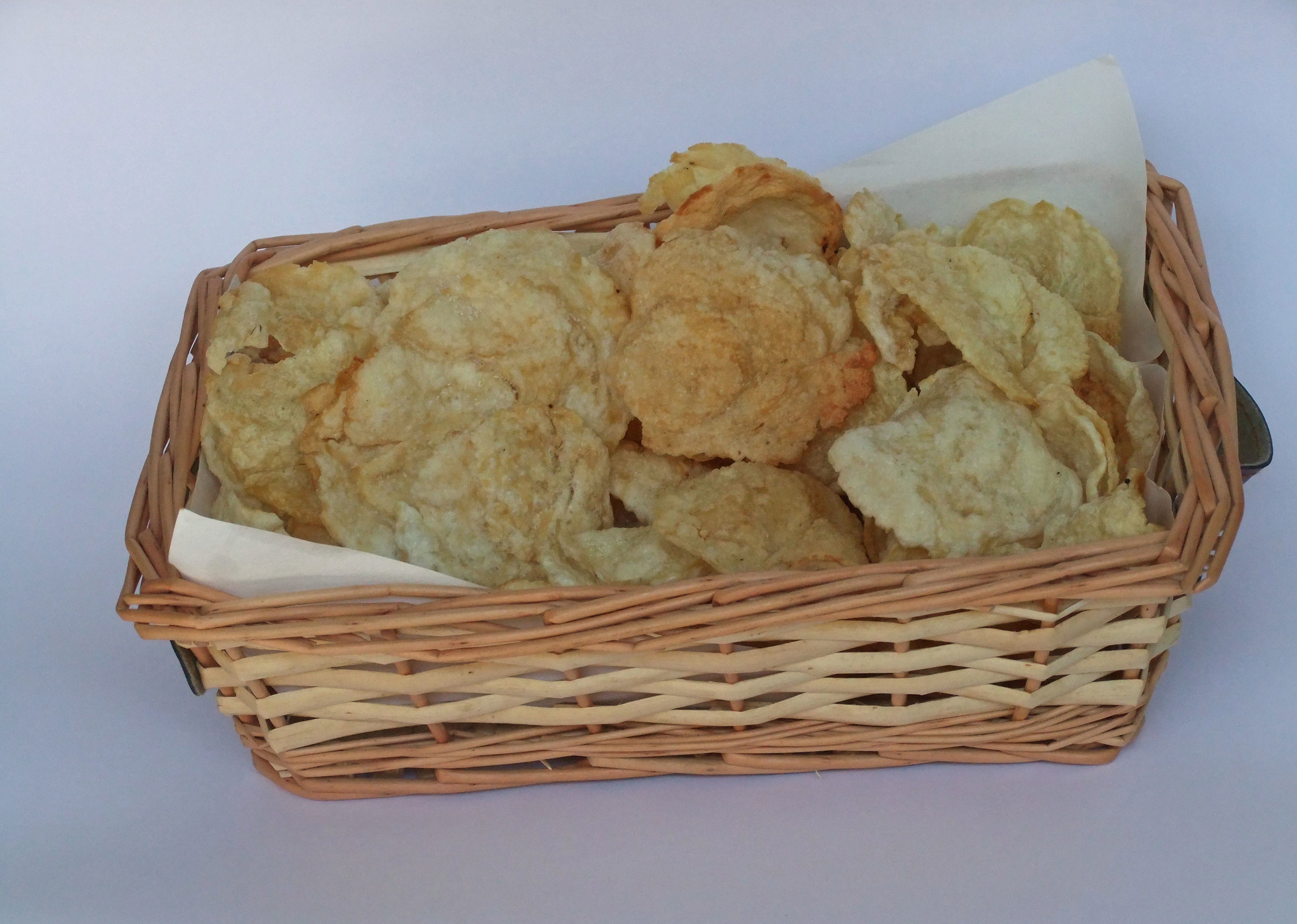
Emping melinjo chips, made from smashed Gnetum gnemon seed

Gnetum nuts are eaten boiled, roasted, or raw in most parts of Southeast Asia and Melanesia. The young leaves, the male strobili (often incorrectly called "flowers"), and the outer flesh of the fruits are also edible when cooked and are eaten in Indonesia, the Philippines, Thailand, Vanuatu, Papua New Guinea, the Solomon Islands, and Fiji. They have a slightly sour taste and are commonly eaten in soups and stews.

Gnetum is most widely used in Indonesian cuisine where it is known as melinjo or belinjo. The seeds are used for sayur asem (sour vegetable soup) and also, made into raw chips that later need to be deep-fried as crackers (emping, a type of krupuk). The crackers have a slightly bitter taste and are frequently served as a snack or accompaniment to Indonesian dishes.

This plant is commonly cultivated throughout the Aceh region and is regarded as a vegetable of high status. Its male strobili, young leaves and female strobilus are used as ingredients in traditional vegetable curry called kuah pliek. This dish is served on all important traditional occasions, such as khanduri and keureudja. In the Pidie district, the women pick the red-skinned ripe fruit and make keureupuk muling from it.

== Phytochemicals ==
Dimer Resveratrol Structure

Recently, it has been discovered that melinjo strobili are rich in a stilbenoid composed of resveratrol and identified as a dimer. This result was published in XXIII International Conference on Polyphenols, Canada, in 2006.

Melinjo resveratrol, having antibacterial and antioxidative activity, works as a food preservative, off flavour inhibitor and taste enhancer. This species may have applications in food industries which do not use any synthetic chemicals in their processes.

Four new stilbene oligomers, gnemonol G, H, I and J, were isolated from acetone extract of the root of Gnetum gnemon along with five known stilbenoids, ampelopsin E, cis-ampelopsin E, gnetin C, D and E.

The extraction of dried leaf of Gnetum gnemon with acetone water (1:1) gave C-glycosylflavones (isovitexin, vicenin II, isoswertisin, swertisin, swertiajaponin, isoswertiajaponin).

The separation of a 50% ethanol extract of the dried endosperms yielded gnetin C, gnetin L (new stilbenoid), gnemonosides A, C and D, and resveratrol which were tested for DPPH radical scavenging action, antimicrobial activity and inhibition of lipase and α-amylase from porcine pancreas. Gnetin C showed the best effect among these stilbenoids.

Oral administration of the 50% ethanol extract of melinjo fruit at 100 mg/kg/day significantly enhanced the production of the Th1 cytokines IL-2 and IFN-γ irrespective of concanavalin-A stimulation, whereas the production of the Th2 cytokines IL-4 and IL-5 was not affected. New stilbene glucosides gnemonoside L and gnemonoside M, and known stilbenoids resveratrol, isorhapontigenin, gnemonoside D, gnetins C and E were isolated from the extract. Gnemonoside M strongly enhanced Th1 cytokine production in cultured Peyer's patch cells from mice at 10 mg/kg/day.
