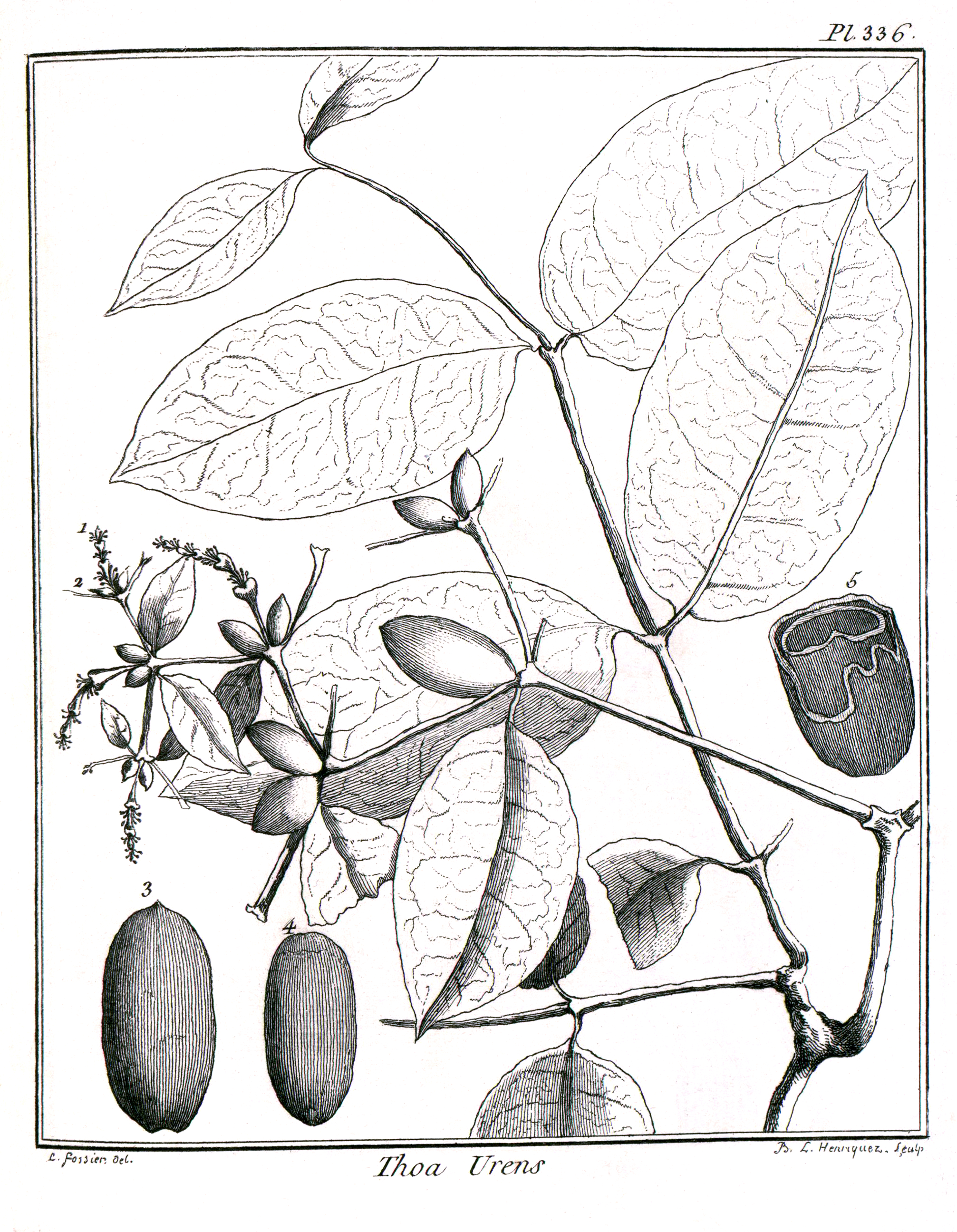

Conservation status
- Least Concern (IUCN 3.1)

Scientific classification
- Kingdom: Plantae
- Clade: Tracheophytes
- Clade: Gymnospermae
- Division: Gnetophyta
- Order: Gnetales
- Family: Gnetaceae
- Genus: Gnetum
- Species: G. urens

Binomial name
- Gnetum urens (Aubl.) Blume
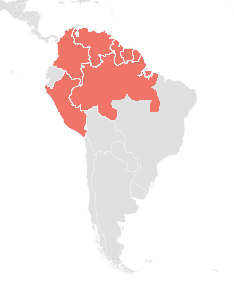

Synonyms
- Synonymy: Gnemon urens Kuntz.; Gnetum Melinoii Benoist; Gnetum thoa Brongn.; Thoa urens Aubl.; Helianthus lenticularis Douglas; Gnetum leyboldii var. woodsonianum Markgr.

= Gnetum urens =

Species of plant

Gnetum urens is a vine native to northern South America. Its common name is bell bird's heart. There are no major economic uses of G. urens. While it has had several names, the accepted scientific name is G. urens (Aubl.) Blume as published in 1834.

== Description ==
G. urens is a slender vine with smooth, light gray bark.

It has thin, elliptic leaves up to 12 cm long and 6 cm wide. The leaf apex is acute and the base is obtuse. They are yellow-green in color. Primary and secondary veins are narrow, while tertiary veins are relatively obscure.

The microsporangiate axes are sparsely branched, with short internodes of about 1-2 mm between bract collars. Microsporophyll barely extends past the collar. The female branches are rarely branched, with an internode of up to 10 mm between bract collars. Mature seeds range in color from yellow to red and are oblong to obovoid in shape. The seeds grow up to 40 mm long and 20 mm in diameter, with a thin outer layer and a fibrous inner layer.

== Habitat ==
It occupies river valleys, river basins, and black water swamps in northern Brazil, Colombia, French Guiana, Guyana, Peru, Suriname, and Venezuela. Its seeds are distributed during the flood season by Doradid catfish.

== Conservation ==
The IUCN Red List assessment published in 2013 of G. urens has placed it in Least Concern category. While the forests of the region face deforestation and mining, there are no specific threats to the tree, and these issues do not constitute a major threat to the survival of the species
