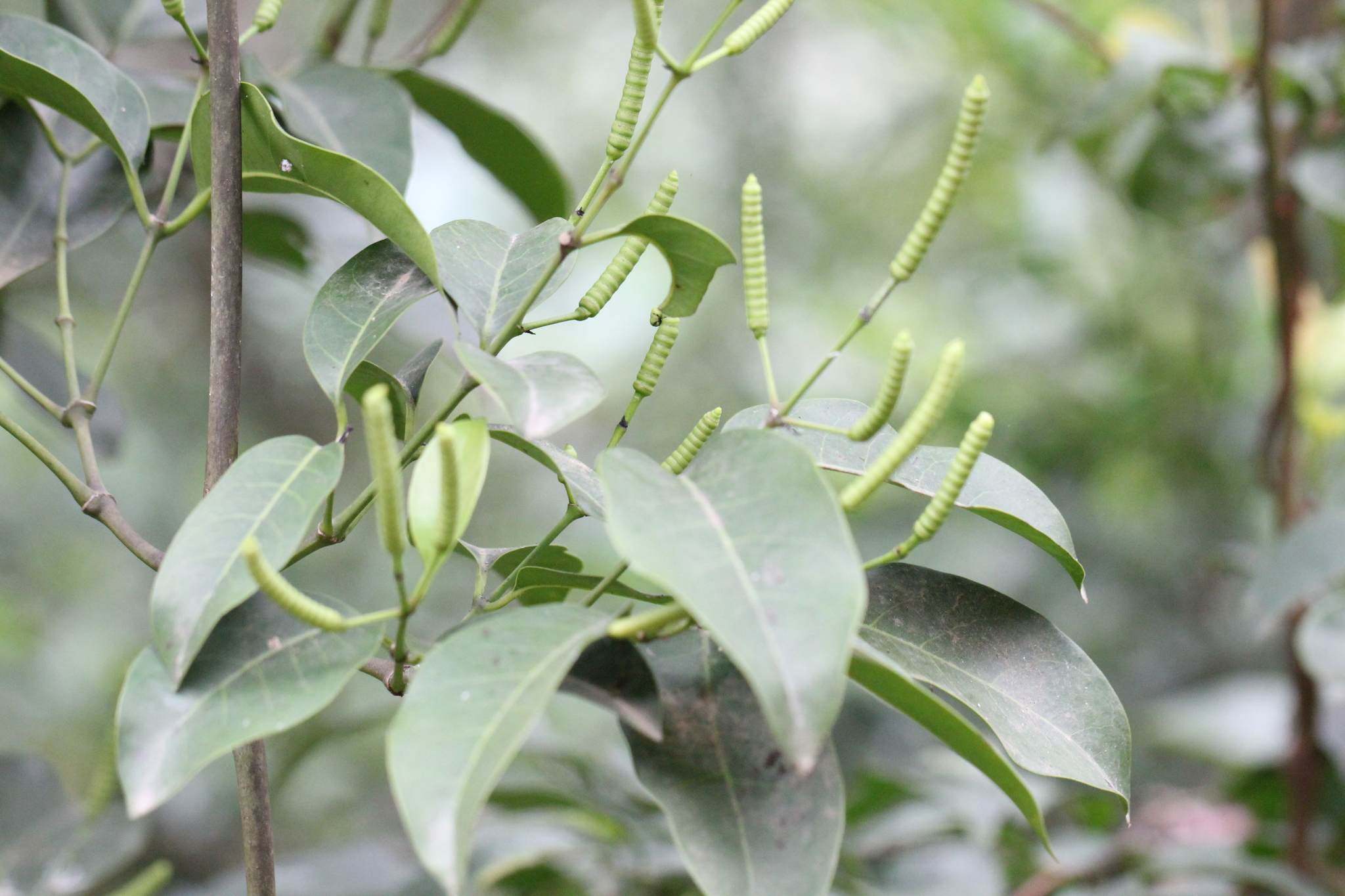
- Gnetum luofuense in China

Scientific classification
- Kingdom: Plantae
- Clade: Embryophytes
- Clade: Tracheophytes
- Clade: Gymnosperms
- Division: Pinophyta
- Class: Pinopsida
- Subclass: Gnetidae
- Order: Gnetales; Mart
- Family: Gnetaceae; Blume
- Genus: Gnetum; L.

Type species
- Gnetum gnemon L.
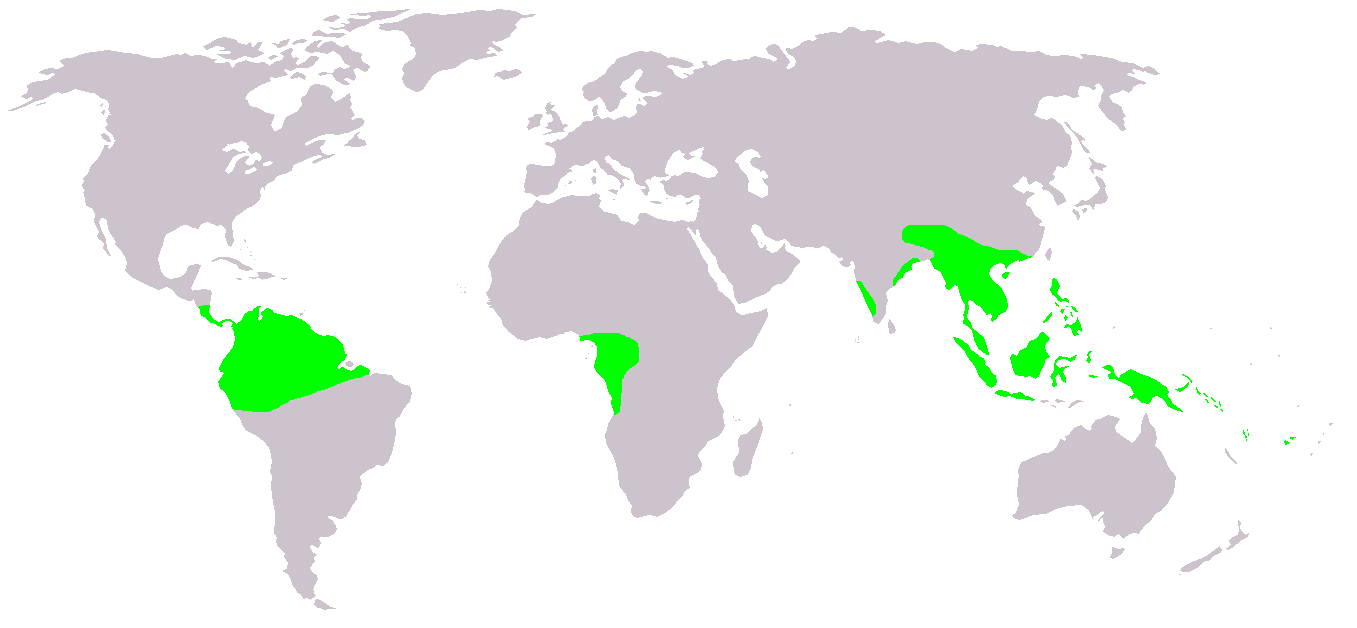
- Distribution

Synonyms
- Gnemon Rumph. ex Kuntze; Thoa Aubl.; Abutua Lour.; Arthostema Neck.

= Gnetum =

Genus of plants

Gnetum is a genus of gymnosperms, the sole genus in the family Gnetaceae within the Gnetidae. They are tropical evergreen trees, shrubs and lianas. Unlike other gymnosperms, they possess vessel elements in the xylem. Some species have been proposed to have been the first plants to be insect-pollinated as their fossils occur in association with extinct pollinating scorpionflies. Molecular phylogenies based on nuclear and plastid sequences from most of the species indicate hybridization among some of the Southeast Asian species. Fossil-calibrated molecular-clocks suggest that the Gnetum lineages now found in Africa, South America and Southeast Asia are the result of ancient long-distance dispersal across seawater.

Their leaves are rich in phytochemicals such as flavonoids and stilbenes. Of the species studied so far, Gnetum have photosynthetic and transpiration capacities which are considerably lower than those of other seed plants, due to the absence of multiple chloroplast genes essential for photosynthesis, a trait they seem to share with the other living members of Gnetophyta, Ephedra and Welwitschia, as well as conifers. There are at least 44 species of Gnetum.

== Species ==
Phylogeny of Gnetum

- - subsection Araeognemones
  - - subsection Micrognemones
    - - section Gnetum
      - section Scandentia
        - subsection Gnemonoides
        - - subsection Stipitati
          - subsection Sessiles

Phylogeny of Gnetum

- - - section Micrognemones
      G. buchholzianum Engler
  - - - G. africanum (de Loureiro) Welwitsch
      - - section Gnetum
          - - subsection Gnetum
              - G. costatum Schum.
              - G. gnemon von Linné
          - - subsection Gnemonoides
              - G. raya Markgraf
              - G. gnemonoides Brongniart
            - subsection Araeognemones
              - - G. leyboldii Tulasne
                - G. nodiflorum Brongniart
              - - G. schwackeanum Taubert & Schenck ex Taubert & Markgraf
                - - G. paniculatum Spruce ex Bentham
                  - - G. camporum (Markgraf) Stevenson & Zanoni
                    - G. urens (Aublet) Blume
    - - section Scandentia
        - - G. microcarpum Blume
          - - G. diminutum Markgraf
            - G. klossii Merrill ex Markgraf
        - - subsection Stipitati
            - G. parvifolium (Warburg) Cheng
            - - G. luofuense Cheng
              - - G. indicum (de Loureiro) Merrill
                - - G. hainanense Cheng ex Fu, Yu & Gilbert
                  - G. montanum Markgraf
          - subsection Sessiles
            - G. macrostachyum Hooker
            - - G. latifolium Blume
              - - G. edule (Willdenow) Blume
                - - - G. neglectum Blume
                    - G. leptostachyum Blume
                  - - G. ula Brongniart
                    - - G. tenuifolium Ridley
                      - G. cuspidatum Blume

There are around 50 different species of Gnetum. The Catalogue of Life lists 44 species.

- Gnetum interruptum Biye
- Gnetum latispicum Biye
- Gnetum sect. Gnetum
  - Gnetum subsect. Gnetum – 2 species of trees; Southeast Asia, Pacific Islands
    - Gnetum gnemon – Tibet, Yunnan, Assam, Indochina, Nicobar Islands, Malaysia, Indonesia, Philippines, New Guinea, Melanesia, Micronesia
    - Gnetum costatum – New Guinea, Solomon Islands
  - Gnetum subsect. Micrognemones – 2 species of lianas; tropical west Africa
    - Gnetum africanum – central Africa from Cameroon to Angola
    - Gnetum buchholzianum – central Africa from Nigeria to Zaire
  - Gnetum subsect. Araeognemones – 9 species of lianas; tropical South America and Central America - Ituá
    - Gnetum camporum – Venezuela
    - Gnetum leyboldii – Costa Rica, Panama, Venezuela, Colombia, Ecuador, Peru, Amazonian Brazil
    - Gnetum nodiflorum – Guianas, Venezuela, Colombia, Ecuador, Peru, northwestern Brazil
    - Gnetum paniculatum – Guianas, Venezuela, northwestern Brazil
    - Gnetum schwackeanum – Amazonas State of southern Venezuela, northwestern Brazil
    - Gnetum urens – Guianas, Venezuela, Peru, northwestern Brazil
    - Gnetum venosum – Bolívar State of southern Venezuela, northwestern Brazil
- Gnetum sect. Scandentia [Gnetum sect. Cylindrostachys] - about 20 species of lianas; southern Asia
  - Gnetum subsect. Stipitati
    - Gnetum arboreum – Luzon in Philippines
    - Gnetum contractum – southern India
    - Gnetum edule – southern India
    - Gnetum gracilipes – Yunnan + Guangxi in China
    - Gnetum latifolium – Assam, much of Southeast Asia, New Guinea, Bismarck Archipelago
    - Gnetum montanum – Himalayas, southern China, northern Indochina
    - Gnetum oblongum – Bangladesh, Myanmar
    - Gnetum pendulum – Tibet, southern China
    - Gnetum tenuifolium – Peninsular Malaysia, Thailand, Sumatra
    - Gnetum ula
  - Gnetum subsect. Sessiles
    - Gnetum acutum – Sarawak
    - Gnetum bosavicum – Papua New Guinea
    - Gnetum catasphaericum – southern China
    - Gnetum chinense Yang, Liu, & Chang – northern China
    - Gnetum cleistostachyum – southern China
    - Gnetum cuspidatum – Indochina, Indonesia, Malaysia, Philippines
    - Gnetum diminutum – Borneo
    - Gnetum formosum – Vietnam
    - Gnetum giganteum – Guangxi in China
    - Gnetum globosum – Pahang in Malaysia
    - Gnetum gnemonoides – New Guinea, Bismarck Archipelago, Indonesia, Philippines
    - Gnetum hainanense – southern China
    - Gnetum klossii – Sabah
    - Gnetum leptostachyum – Laos, Thailand, Vietnam, Borneo
    - Gnetum loerzingii – Sumatra
    - Gnetum luofuense – Fujian, Guangdong, Jiangxi
    - Gnetum macrostachyum – Indochina, Indonesia, Malaysia, New Guinea
    - Gnetum microcarpum – Myanmar, Thailand, Malaysia, Borneo, Sumatra
    - Gnetum neglectum – Borneo
    - Gnetum oxycarpum – Sumatra
    - Gnetum parvifolium – Laos, Vietnam, southern China
    - Gnetum raya – Borneo
    - Gnetum ridleyi – Peninsular Malaysia

== Uses ==
Many Gnetum species are edible, with the seeds being roasted, and the foliage used as a leaf vegetable. The plant is harvested and yields a useful fiber. There is no sense of danger in consuming the fruit or the seeds.

There is also a study done on the plant to see if it has any medicinal properties, finding some anti-coagulation effects due to its stilbenoid content. The family Gnetaceae is well known as a rich source of plant-derived stilbenoids as well as Cyperaceae, Dipterocarpaceae, Fabaceae, and Vitaceae.

== Conservation ==
Some species of Gnetum are in danger of dying out. The habitats are being removed with the trees being cut down to create industry. The tropical rainforests are being destroyed so many of the species are going extinct such as Gnetum oxycarpum. The rainforests are being torn down and being turned into farmland. Gnetum live in only a small part of the rainforest.

== Gallery ==
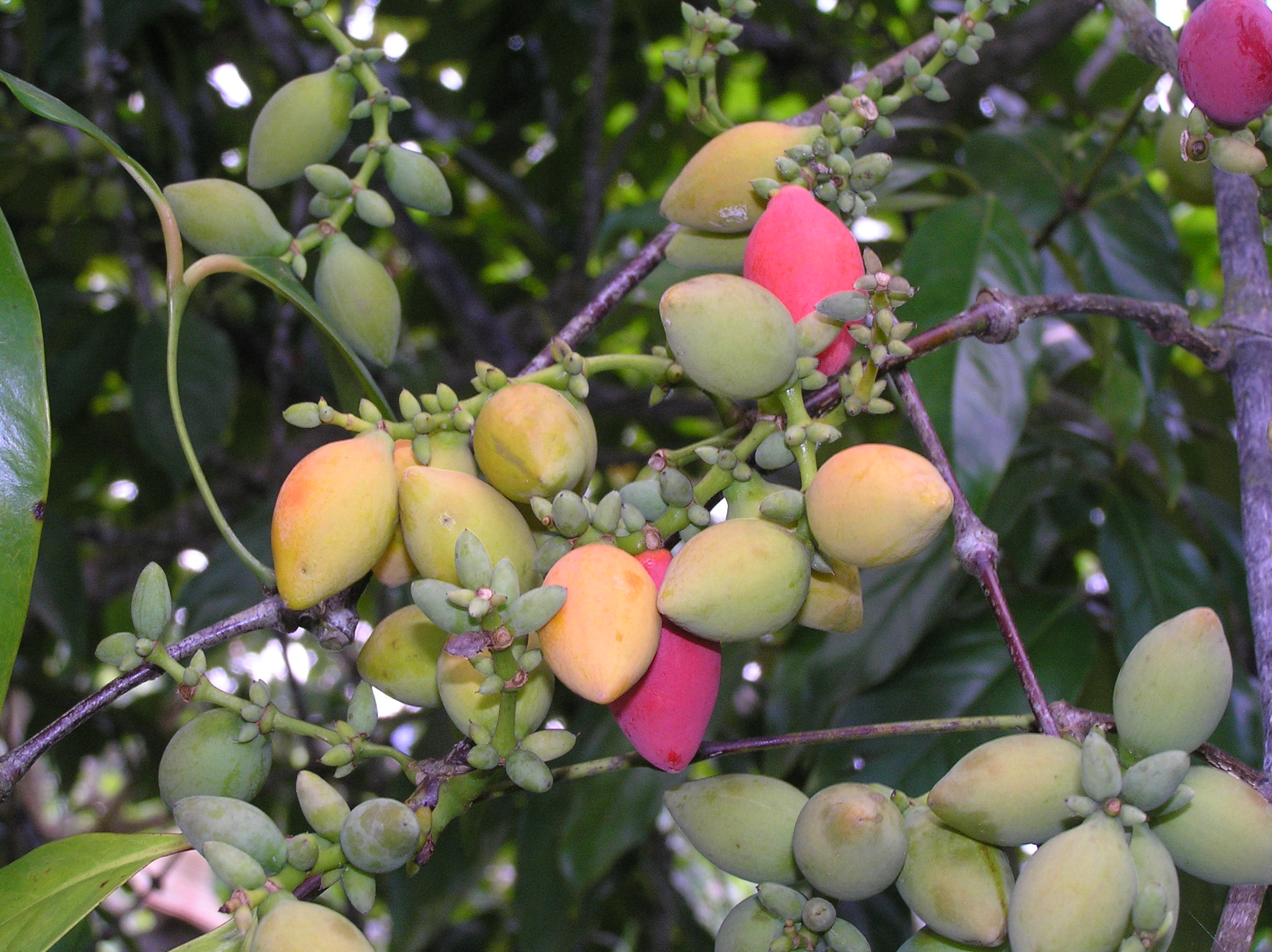
Gnetum gnemon carpellate/female cones

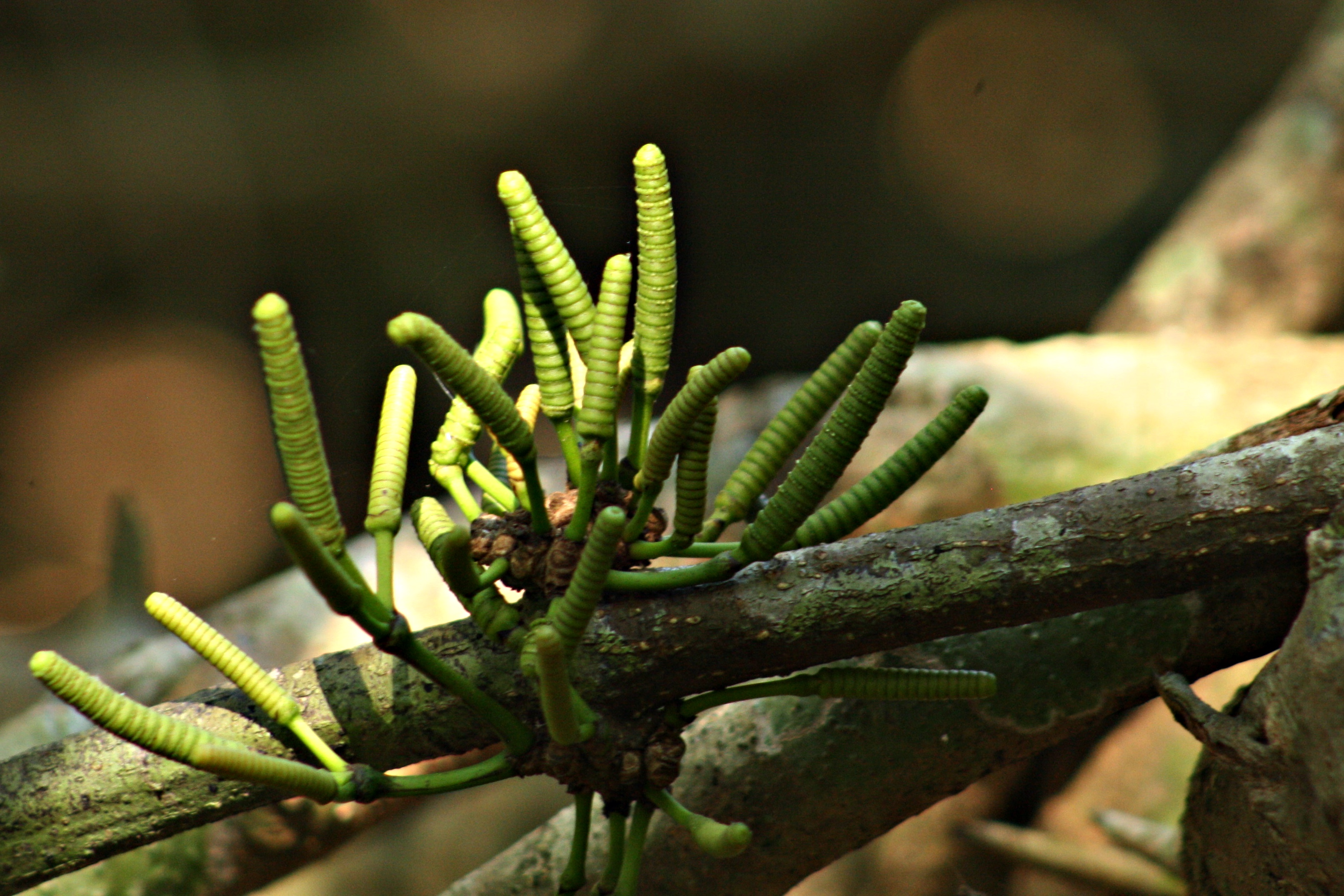
Gnetum latifolium staminate/male cones

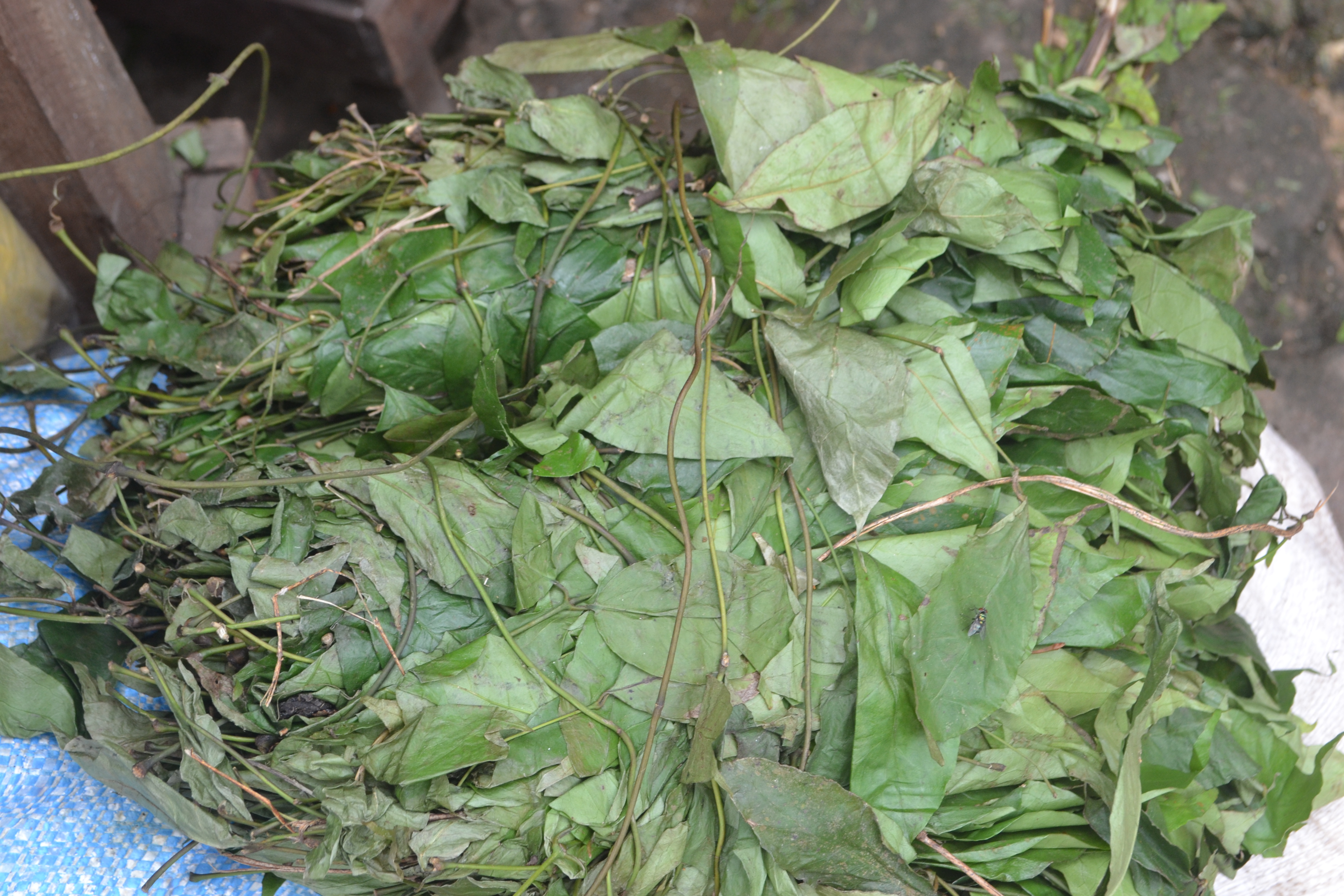
Gathered leaves of Gnetum africanum

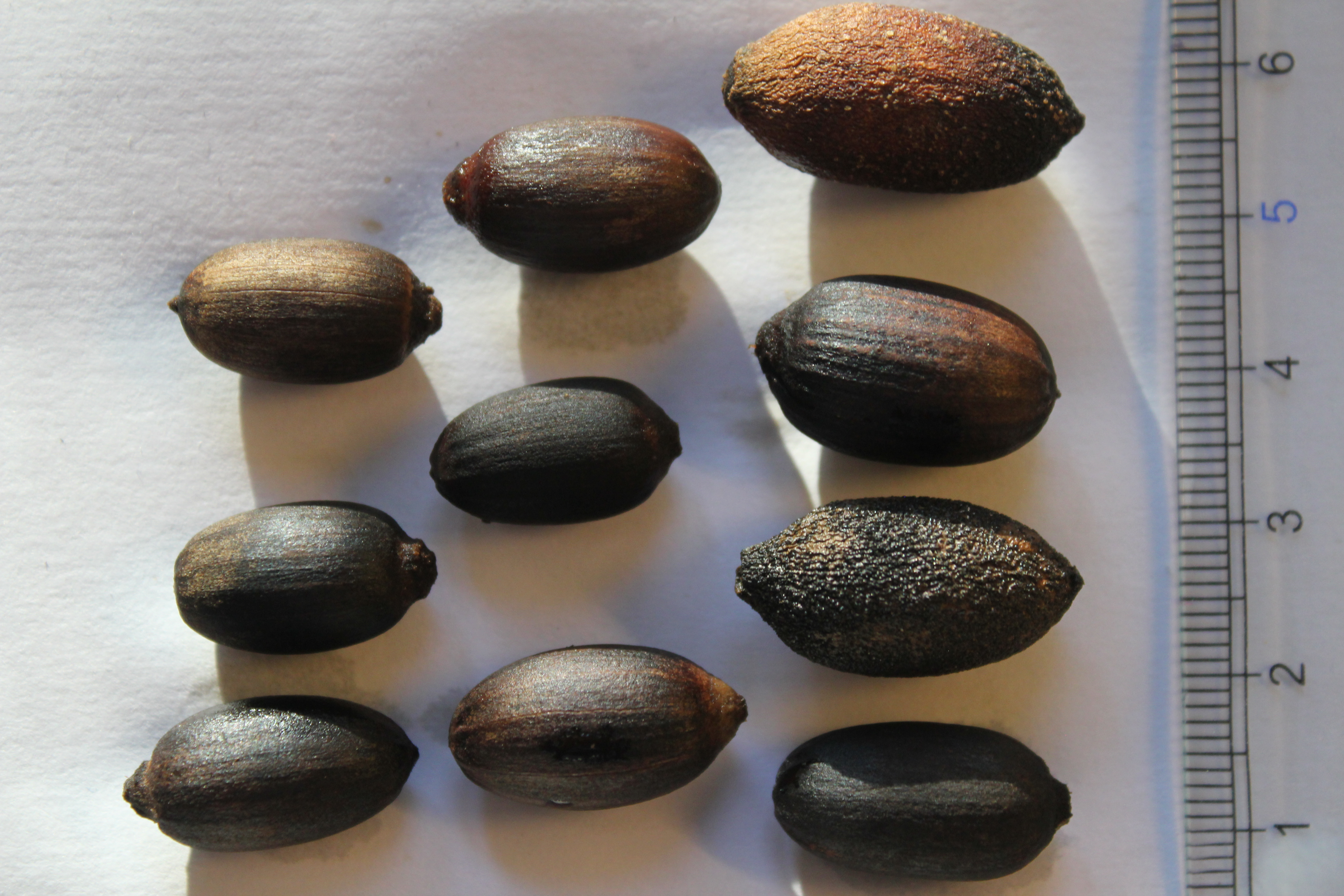
Gnetum gnemon seeds
