= Pollen theft =

Net removal of pollen by an animal

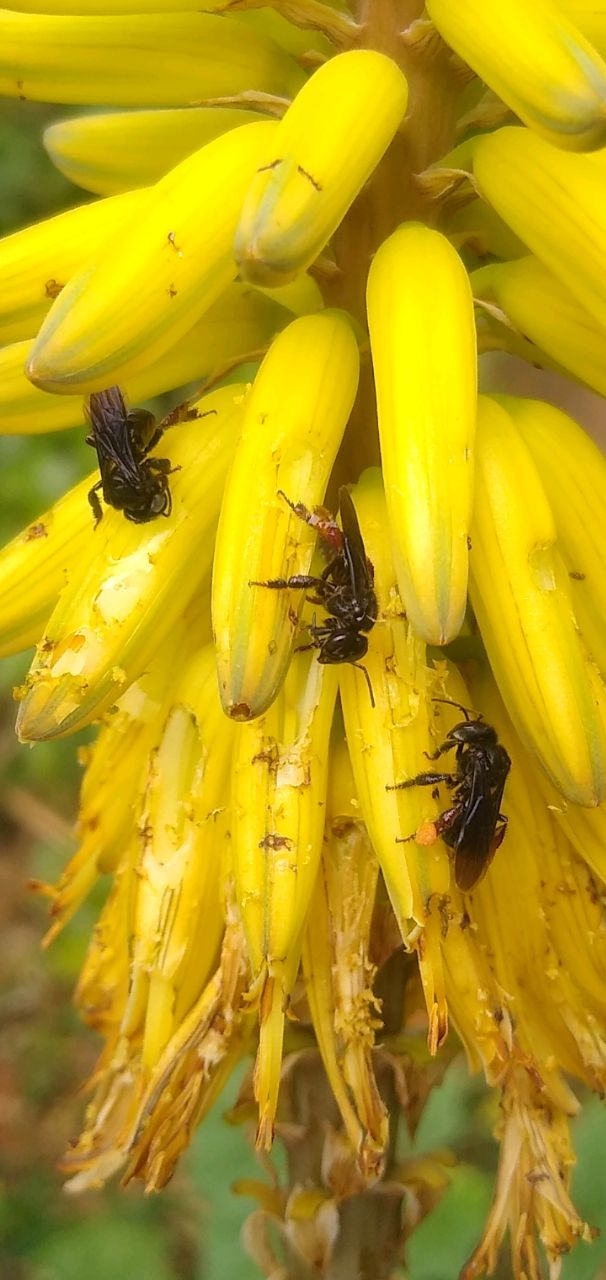
Trigona bees chew through unopened flowers to access pollen

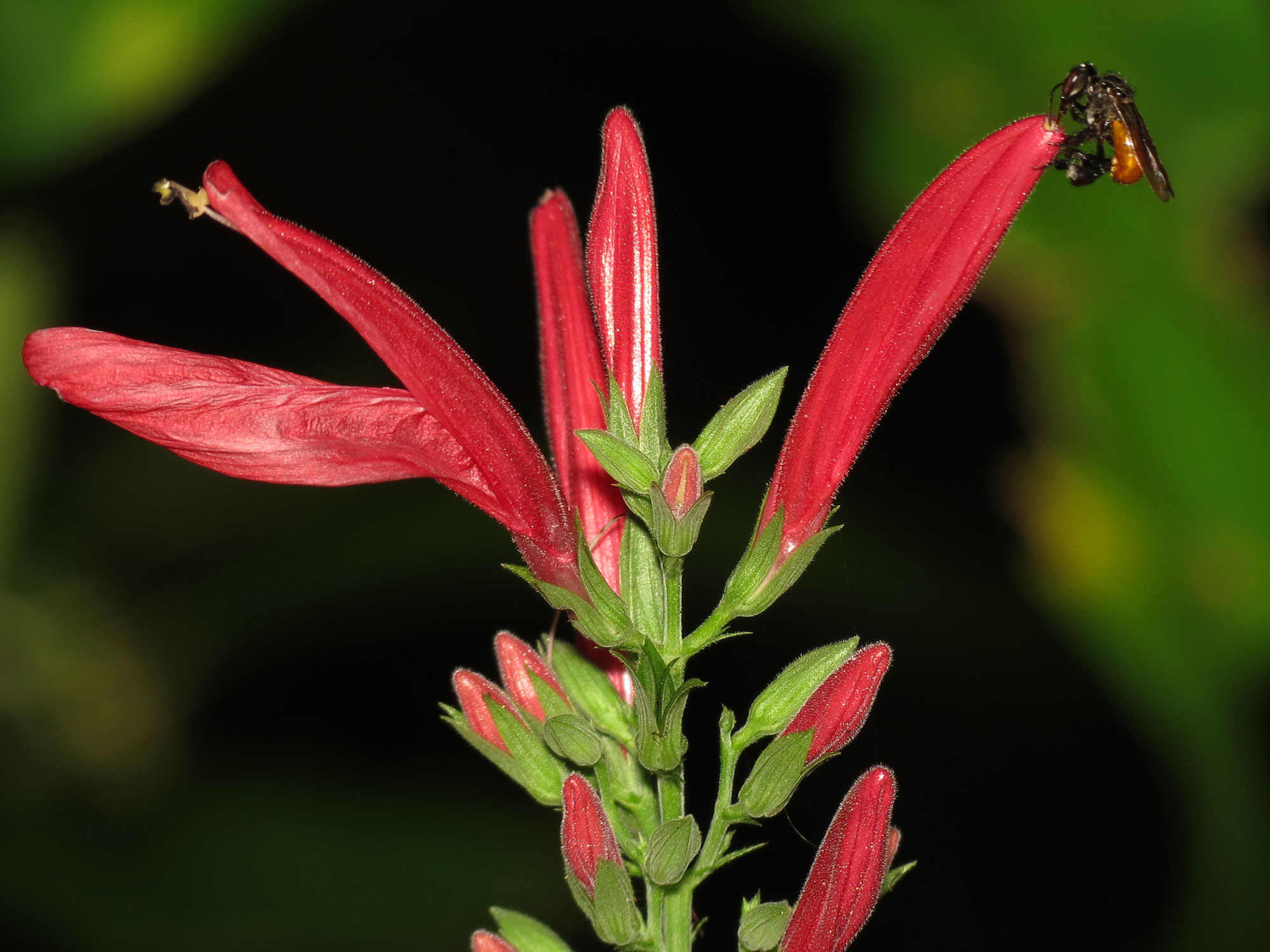
Trigona bees chew through unopened flowers to access pollen

Pollen theft, also known as pollen robbery or floral larceny, occurs when an animal actively eats or collects pollen from a plant species but provides little or no pollination in return. Pollen theft was named as a concept at least as early as 1980, and examples have been documented well before that. For example, native honey bees were documented 'stealing' large amounts of pollen from the large, bat-pollinated flowers of Parkia clappertoniana in Ghana in the 1950s. Nevertheless, pollen theft has typically received far less research attention than nectar robbing, despite the more direct consequences on plant reproduction.

== Pollen thieves ==
Few pollen-collecting animals are obligate pollen thieves. Rather pollen theft generally arises from a mismatch between the morphology or behaviour of a pollen collecting animal and the morphology or phenology of a flowering plant species. The clearest examples of pollen theft are when pollen-collecting insects visit only the male (pollen-bearing) plants of dioecious species, and so never come into contact with female flowers. However pollen theft can also arise if pollen-collectors visit only male-phase (pollen-bearing) flowers of dichogamous species, or are too small to contact stigmas while collecting pollen from species with large or highly herkogamous flowers. Pollen thieves include beetles, flies, thrips, and even a parakeet, but the vast majority documented so far have been bees. These include Trigona species, which often bite through anthers to access pollen, Halictids, bumble bees, and, most commonly of all, honey bees. Honey bees are thought to be particularly common pollen thieves as they are behaviourally flexible, often visiting flowers in 'unexpected' ways that avoid floral mechanisms for ensuring pollen deposition, or because they have been introduced by humans for agriculture and so more frequently encounter plants that have not evolved in their presence.

== Impact on plant ecology and evolution ==
Because pollen serves as both an attractant to pollinators and as the carrier of male gametes (i.e. is directly involved in plant sexual reproduction), loss of pollen to pollen theft can reduce the reproductive success of both individual plants and entire plant populations. An experiment in South Africa found that native pollen thieves (bees) significantly increased pollen removal but decreased pollen receipt and seed set in populations of bird-pollinated Aloe maculata. In Brazil, exotic honey bees reduced pollen in anthers by 99% and were negatively correlated with seed set in the dioecious species Clusia arrudae. In Australia, exotic honey bees were unable to collect pollen from buzz-pollinated anthers of Melastoma affine, so instead stole pollen that had already been deposited on stigmas, halving seed set when they were they last visitor. In another Australian example, honey bees had no effect on reproduction in Grevillea barklyana when bird pollinators were common, but reduced seed set by 50% when bird pollinators were rare by preventing delayed autonomous self-pollination (ie disrupting reproductive assurance).

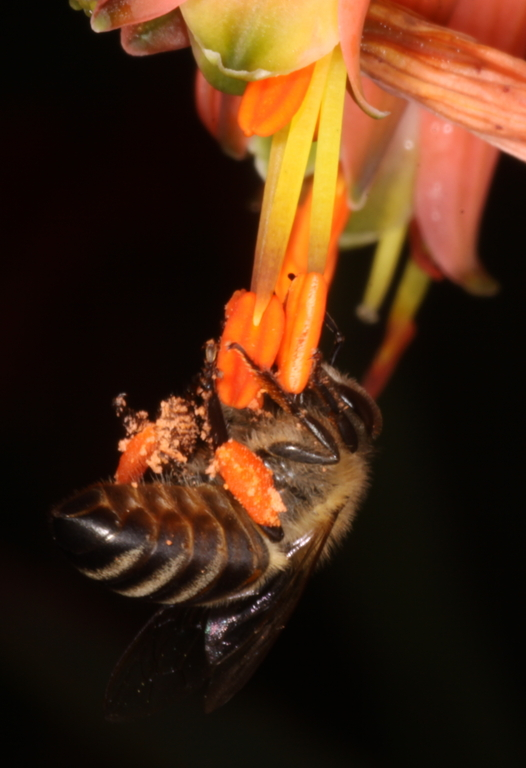
Honey bee collects pollen from male-phase flowers of Aloe. Honey bees often act as pollen thieves on bird-pollinated aloes in South Africa.

Pollen theft may strongly affect floral evolution whenever some plant individuals are more vulnerable than others. Whlle it is hard to hindcast why any modern traits evolved, several could have been selected on by pollen theft. These include mechanisms to hide pollen, such as buzz-pollination or pollen release that requires a forceful trigger, or chemical deterrents in pollen.
