= List of inventoried conifers in Canada =

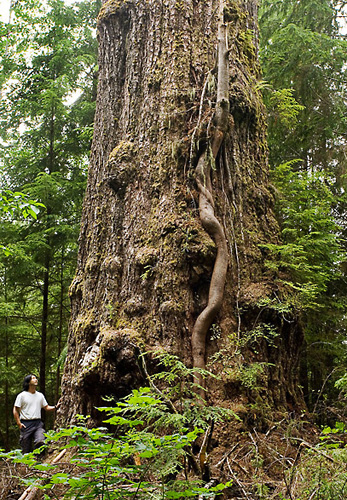
The Red Creek Fir

Canada's national forest inventory includes many native conifer species. (Note: This list omits hybrids and varieties. The taxonomy (classification) comes from Plants of the World Online except as noted.) All except the larches are evergreens. Most are in the pine family, except for yews (in the yew family) and junipers, Alaska cedars and thuja cedars (in the cypress family). (Note: Thuja cedars are often called just cedars, but so are many other species.)

Softwood from North American conifers has a variety of commercial uses. The sturdier timber is milled for plywood, wood veneer and construction framing, including structural support beams and studs. Logs can be fashioned into posts, poles and railroad ties. Less sturdy timber is often ground and processed into pulpwood, principally for papermaking. Resins from sap yield wood tar, turpentine or other terpenes. Some resins and other tree products contain dangerous toxins (not generally listed below).

== Key ==
Provinces and territories (see the Distribution column): AB Alberta, BC British Columbia, MB Manitoba, NB New Brunswick, NL Newfoundland and Labrador, NS Nova Scotia, NT Northwest Territories, NU Nunavut, ON Ontario, PE Prince Edward Island, QC Quebec, SK Saskatchewan, YT Yukon

== Conifers ==
Conifers
Species and a common name	Notes and commercial uses	Distribution in Canada provincial tree of: avg height; growth rate	Limits for soil pH, annual precipitation and low temperature	Tolerance to Fire and Shade	Landscapes, bark and cones with foliage
Abies amabilis (Pacific silver fir)	Can reach 70 m (230 ft) in height. The timber is lightweight, with low resin content. The species can easily be distinguished from non-fir conifers by the grey, blistery trunk and rigid branches. Uses: timber; landscaping, pulpwood, veneers, winter holiday decorations.	BC none 50 m (165 ft); slow	pH 3.3–6.0 97–660 cm (38–260 in) −33 °C (−28 °F)	Fire: intolerant Shade: tolerant	landscape foliage and landscape bark cone and foliage
Abies balsamea (balsam fir)	A significant source of food and shelter for wildlife. Horizontal blisters in the bark contain aromatic Canada balsam. The lightweight timber is economically important in Canada. Uses: timber; landscaping, pulpwood, terpenes, veneers, winter holiday decorations.	All provinces except BC NB 18 m (60 ft); slow	pH 4.0–6.0 33–152 cm (13–60 in) −42 °C (−43 °F)	Fire: intolerant Shade: tolerant	habit landscape bark cones and foliage
Abies grandis (grand fir)	Can reach 70 m (230 ft) in height. The foliage has a distinct orange-like scent. The wood is soft, and not as durable as in other fir species. Uses: timber; landscaping, pulpwood, veneers, winter holiday decorations.	BC none 46 m (150 ft); moderate	pH 4.5–7.5 28–254 cm (11–100 in) −36 °C (−33 °F)	Fire: tolerant Shade: tolerant	landscape bark young cones
Abies lasiocarpa (subalpine fir)	Provides habitat for wildlife and nutrition for livestock. Canada's inventory includes Abies bifolia, now considered a synonym of the variety A. lasiocarpa var. lasiocarpa. Uses: timber; landscaping, pulpwood, winter holiday decorations.	AB BC NT YT YT 27 m (90 ft); slow	pH 4.0–6.5 51–381 cm (20–150 in) −46 °C (−51 °F)	Fire: intolerant Shade: tolerant	landscape bark cones and foliage
Callitropsis nootkatensis (Alaska cedar)	Formerly a significant timber tree providing durable, multi-use wood. Most of the trees have already been cleared, aside from limited numbers in protected areas. It is listed as Chamaecyparis nootkatensis in Canada's inventory. Uses: timber; landscaping.	BC none 23 m (75 ft); slow	pH 5.5–7.0 110–250 cm (45–100 in) −30 °C (−22 °F)	Fire: intolerant Shade: tolerant	three treetops habit and foliage bark cone and foliage
Juniperus scopulorum (Rocky Mountain juniper)	Usually a shrub or small tree. The wood is durable, especially when seasoned, and suitable for furniture. The resins are aromatic. Uses: landscaping, posts, veneers.	AB BC SK none 15 m (50 ft); slow	pH 5.0–8.5 23–66 cm (9–26 in) −39 °C (−38 °F)	Fire: intolerant Shade: intolerant	landscape bark foliage and cones
Juniperus virginiana (eastern red cedar)	An important support species for wildlife throughout its range. Although the tree has limited commercial use, the wood is highly valued for its appearance and robustness. The resins are aromatic. Uses: landscaping, posts, veneers, winter holiday decorations.	ON QC none 15 m (50 ft); slow	pH 4.7–8.0 38–173 cm (15–68 in) −42 °C (−43 °F)	Fire: intolerant Shade: medium	landscape bark foliage and cones
Larix laricina (tamarack)	Adapted to a variety of poor soil conditions, including peatland. The tree has one of the widest distributions among North American conifers. Uses: timber; landscaping, posts, pulpwood.	All provinces and territories NT 24 m (80 ft); rapid	pH 5.5–6.5 18–140 cm (7–55 in) −62 °C (−79 °F)	Fire: intolerant Shade: intolerant	landscape bark cone and foliage
Larix lyallii (subalpine larch)	Distinguishable from western larch by its woolly buds and new growth. In its range, the subalpine larch is often found growing higher on cold mountain slopes than other trees. Uses: landscaping.	AB BC none 12 m (40 ft); slow	pH 3.9–5.6 66–241 cm (26–95 in) −50 °C (−58 °F)	Fire: intolerant Shade: intolerant	landscape bark cone and foliage
Larix occidentalis (western larch)	The largest larch, and the most important one commercially for its timber. Also a significant source of arabinogalactan, a gum used as a thickening agent. Uses: timber; landscaping, posts, pulpwood, veneers.	AB BC none 61 m (200 ft); rapid	pH 6.0–7.0 33–127 cm (13–50 in) −42 °C (−43 °F)	Fire: intolerant Shade: intolerant	landscape bark cone
Picea engelmannii (Engelmann spruce)	Typically contains many small wood knots that lower the grade of the timber. The light colour, long fibres and very low resin content contribute to the quality of its pulpwood. Uses: timber; landscaping, posts, pulpwood, terpenes, veneers.	AB BC none 37 m (120 ft); slow	pH 6.0–8.0 53–406 cm (21–160 in) −46 °C (−50 °F)	Fire: intolerant Shade: tolerant	landscape foliage and cone
Picea glauca (Note: Of these sources, only Plants of the World Online lists this as Picea laxa.) (white spruce)	One of the main sources of Canadian pulpwood and construction timber. It is also used to build furniture, pallets and musical instruments. Uses: timber; pulpwood.	All provinces and territories MB 30 m (100 ft); slow	pH 4.0–8.2 18–127 cm (7–50 in) −54 °C (−65 °F)	Fire: intolerant Shade: medium	landscape bark cone and foliage
Picea mariana (black spruce)	Mainly harvested for pulpwood; construction uses are limited by the small size (for a spruce). The pale yellow wood is lightweight but strong. Birds commonly seen in groves in summer months include ruby-crowned kinglets, ovenbirds and Setophaga warblers. Uses: timber; landscaping, pulpwood, terpenes, winter holiday decorations.	All provinces and territories NL 20 m (65 ft); slow	pH 4.7–6.5 13–152 cm (5–60 in) −62 °C (−79 °F)	Fire: intolerant Shade: tolerant	landscape bark cones and foliage
Picea rubens (red spruce)	The straight-grained wood is lightweight but strong. It is the most popular choice in many stringed instruments for its resonance. Uses: timber; posts, pulpwood, terpenes, veneers.	All eastern provinces NS 34 m (110 ft); moderate	pH 4.0–5.8 71–132 cm (28–52 in) −44 °C (−47 °F)	Fire: intolerant Shade: tolerant	landscape bark cones and foliage
Picea sitchensis (Sitka spruce)	The largest spruce, and one of the most prominent along the western Canadian coastline. The strong wood is used in light aircraft, masts and turbine blades. It is also used in many musical instruments for its resonance. Uses: timber; pulpwood, terpenes.	BC none 61 m (200 ft); moderate	pH 3.9–5.7 56–572 cm (22–225 in) −36 °C (−33 °F)	Fire: intolerant Shade: tolerant	landscape trunk cone and foliage
Pinus albicaulis (whitebark pine)	A slow-growing and long-lived pioneer species that helps reduce the movement of soil and snow. The seeds are a source of nutrition for birds, small mammals, black bears and grizzly bears. Uses: no significant economic uses.	AB BC none 20 m (65 ft); slow	pH 4.8–8.0 46–183 cm (18–72 in) −50 °C (−58 °F)	Fire: intolerant Shade: medium	landscape bark cone and foliage
Pinus banksiana (jack pine)	Sometimes milled for utility poles and railroad ties. It has the broadest distribution of any pine species in the country. Uses: timber; landscaping, posts, pulpwood, terpenes.	All except YT, NU none 24 m (80 ft); rapid	pH 6.0–8.2 38–89 cm (15–35 in) −47 °C (−53 °F)	Fire: intolerant Shade: intolerant	landscape bark cones and foliage
Pinus contorta (lodgepole pine)	Used in paneling, and sometimes milled for utility poles and railroad ties. The trees usually grow rapidly when young and can be harvested economically. Canada's inventory includes the varieties P. contorta var. contorta and P. contorta var. latifolia. Uses: timber; posts, pulpwood, terpenes, veneers.	AB BC NT SK YT AB 30 m (99 ft); rapid	pH 6.2–7.5 46–64 cm (18–25 in) −57 °C (−70 °F)	Fire: intolerant Shade: intolerant	landscape bark (for var. latifolia) cone and foliage
Pinus flexilis (limber pine)	A slow-growing species not usually planted for its timber, but sometimes harvested along with other species. It is adapted to harsh climates, including windy and dry conditions, and provides the only tree cover available on some sites. The species is long-lived; one specimen was found to be 1650 years old. Uses: timber; landscaping, edible seeds	AB BC none 20 m (66 ft); slow	pH 5.7–6.5 51–178 cm (20–70 in) −42 °C (−43 °F)	Fire: intolerant Shade: intolerant	landscape foliage bark cone and foliage
Pinus monticola (Western white pine)	Straight-grained, lightweight and low in resin, the timber is often used in framing and woodworking. Uses: timber; landscaping, pulpwood, terpenes, veneers.	AB BC none 61 m (200 ft); rapid	pH 5.5–7.0 38–76 cm (15–30 in) −36 °C (−33 °F)	Fire: intolerant Shade: medium	landscape bark cones and foliage
Pinus ponderosa (ponderosa pine)	Can reach more than 230 ft (70 m) in height. It is a widely distributed tree in western North America, and one of the main sources of timber, with a relatively fast growth rate. Uses: timber; landscaping, posts, pulpwood, terpenes, veneers.	BC none 68 m (223 ft); moderate	pH 5.0–9.0 38–64 cm (15–25 in) −38 °C (−36 °F)	Fire: tolerant Shade: intolerant	landscape bark foliage and cones
Pinus resinosa (red pine)	One of the fastest-growing and most frequently planted conifer species in Canada. The wood is straight-grained and moderately hard. Some of it is milled for railroad ties and cabin logs. Uses: timber; landscaping, posts, pulpwood, veneers, winter holiday decorations.	All eastern provinces + MB none 24 m (80 ft); rapid	pH 4.5–6.0 38–152 cm (15–60 in) −42 °C (−43 °F)	Fire: intolerant Shade: intolerant	landscape bark foliage and cone
Pinus rigida (pitch pine)	Rigida (rigid) refers to the needles and cone scales. The wood, resinous and rot-resistant, is suitable for shipbuilding, mine timbers, fencing and railroad ties. Uses: landscaping, posts, pulpwood, terpenes, winter holiday decorations.	NS ON QC none 24 m (80 ft); rapid	pH 3.5–5.1 94–142 cm (37–56 in) −42 °C (−43 °F)	Fire: intolerant Shade: intolerant	landscape bark cone and foliage
Pinus strobus (eastern white pine)	One of the most commercially important trees in eastern North America, in part due to its rapid growth. The timber is durable but soft enough for woodworking. Uses: timber; landscaping, posts, pulpwood, veneers, winter holiday decorations.	All eastern provinces + MB ON 46 m (150 ft); rapid	pH 4.0–6.5 51–203 cm (20–80 in) −36 °C (−33 °F)	Fire: intolerant Shade: medium	snowy landscape tree bark cone and foliage
Pseudotsuga menziesii (Douglas fir)	Worldwide, one of the most commercially successful timber trees. Canada's inventory includes the varieties P. menziesii var. glauca and P. menziesii var. menziesii. Uses: timber; landscaping, posts, pulpwood, terpenes, veneers, winter holiday decorations.	AB BC none 61 m (200 ft); moderate	pH 5.0–7.5 46–254 cm (18–100 in) −36 °C (−33 °F)	Fire: intolerant Shade: medium	landscape bark and foliage bark cones and foliage
Taxus brevifolia (western yew)	A shade-tolerant tree of the Yew family. When competing with taller and faster-growing trees, it becomes part of the undergrowth. The seed cones have red arils. Uses: landscaping, posts.	AB BC none 12 m (40 ft); slow	pH 6.2–7.5 61–152 cm (24–60 in) −28 °C (−18 °F)	Fire: intolerant Shade: tolerant	landscape bark foliage and cones
Thuja occidentalis (eastern white-cedar)	The termite- and rot-resistant wood, durable in a range of outdoor conditions, is used in fencing, cabin logs and roof shingles. Uses: timber; landscaping, posts, pulpwood, veneers.	MB and all eastern provinces except NL none 15 m (50 ft); slow	pH 5.2–7.0 89–140 cm (35–55 in) −36 °C (−33 °F)	Fire: intolerant Shade: medium	landscape bark foliage and cones
Thuja plicata (western redcedar)	The only native Thuja species in western North America. The lightweight, durable wood makes good insulation, and is often used in shingles and other roofing materials. Uses: timber; landscaping, posts, pulpwood, veneers.	AB BC BC 46 m (150 ft); slow	pH 5.1–7.1 76–305 cm (30–120 in) −36 °C (−33 °F)	Fire: intolerant Shade: tolerant	landscape tree bark foliage and cones
Tsuga canadensis (eastern hemlock)	Shade-tolerant, long-lived and slow-growing. Historically, it provided tannin for curing leather. Uses: timber; landscaping, pulpwood.	All eastern provinces except NL none 32 m (105 ft); slow	pH 4.2–5.7 81–140 cm (32–55 in) −36 °C (−33 °F)	Fire: medium Shade: tolerant	landscape bark foliage and cones
Tsuga heterophylla (western hemlock)	Used widely in construction. It is also a good source of wood fibre. Uses: timber; landscaping, pulpwood, veneers.	AB BC none 52 m (170 ft); slow	pH 4.5–6.0 97–381 cm (38–150 in) −31 °C (−23 °F)	Fire: intolerant Shade: tolerant	forest landscape bark foliage and cone
Tsuga mertensiana (mountain hemlock)	Grows well in snow-covered subalpine zones. Uses: timber; landscaping, pulpwood, veneers.	BC none 38 m (125 ft); slow	pH 4.5–7.3 110–360 cm (42–140 in) −28 °C (−18 °F)	Fire: intolerant Shade: tolerant	landscape bark cone and foliage

== Genera ==
Additional growth requirements for the species listed above, grouped by genus (Note: For further explanations of the columns, see the Help Document at "Growth Requirements".)
Genus, a common name, and family (if not the pine family)	Low-oxygen soil tolerance	Cold winters needed	Frost-free days needed	Moisture use	Soil salinity tolerance
Abies (firs)	None (low for A. grandis)	Yes	60–120	Medium	None
Callitropsis (Alaska cedar, cypress family)	Low	Yes	111	Medium	None
Juniperus (junipers, cypress family)	Low or none	Yes	120–140	Low	Low
Larix (larches)	None (low for L. laricina)	Yes (no for L. lyallii)	60–90	Low (medium for L. laricina)	None (low for L. laricina)
Picea (spruces)	Low or none	No (yes for P. glauca and P. mariana)	30–111	Medium (high for P. mariana)	None (medium for P. glauca)
Pinus (pines)	Low or none	Yes	50–150	Medium or low	Low or none (medium for P. ponderosa)
Pseudotsuga (Douglas firs)	Low	Yes	130	Medium	Low
Taxus (yews, yew family)	None	Yes	140	Low	None
Thuja (thuja cedars, cypress family)	Medium (none for T. plicata)	Yes	100–180	Medium	Medium (none for T. plicata)
Tsuga (hemlocks)	None	Yes	80–160	Medium (high for T. mertensiana)	None

== See also ==
- List of gymnosperm families
- List of inventoried conifers in the United States
- List of inventoried hardwoods in the United States
