= List of inventoried hardwoods in the United States =

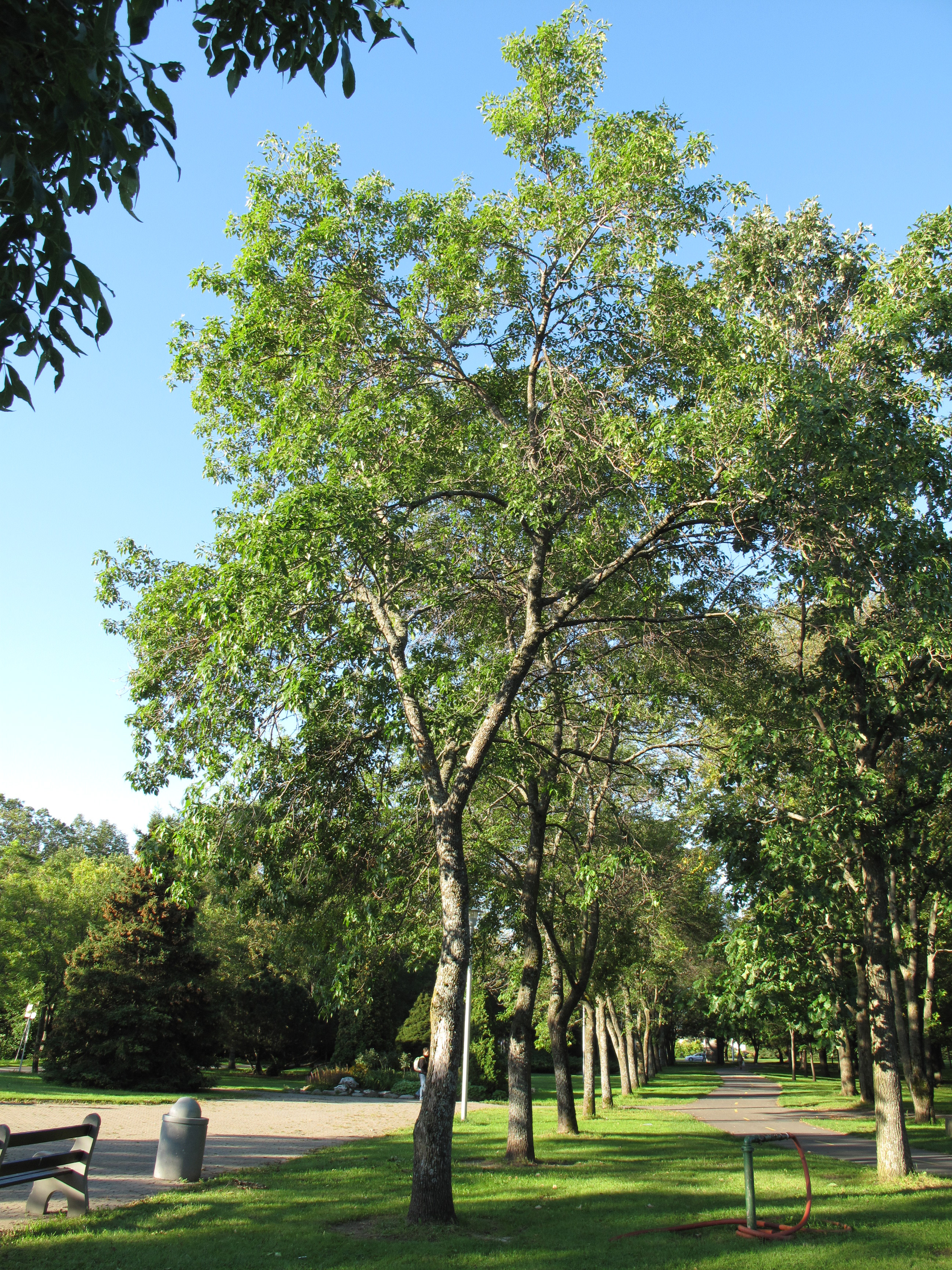
Many native ash species, including white ash (pictured), have been declining rapidly this century due to predation by the emerald ash borer.

Silvics of North America, a forest inventory compiled and published by the United States Forest Service in 1991, includes many hardwood trees. (Note: The taxonomy (classification) on this page comes from Plants of the World Online (POWO) and the US Department of Agriculture's Plants Database except as noted, and omits hybrids and varieties. The 1991 inventory has limited coverage outside Canada and the US, and is not used outside the US in this list.) It superseded Silvics of Forest Trees of the United States (1965), which was the first such formal scholarly inventory. A variety of statistics on all of these trees are maintained by the National Plant Data Team of the US Department of Agriculture.

Hardwood has a variety of commercial uses, including in furniture, carpentry, tools and musical instruments. Some timber is milled for plywood, wood veneer and construction framing, including structural support beams and studs. Logs can be fashioned into posts and poles. Less sturdy timber is often ground and processed into pulpwood, principally for papermaking. Resins from sap yield wood tar, turpentine or other terpenes. Much of the economic value of trees comes from orchards and ornamental uses.

== Key ==
Fire tolerance is a relative measure of a plant's ability to survive smaller fires or to resprout or reseed after larger fires.
Shade tolerance is a relative measure of a plant's ability to do well in reduced sunlight.
POWO: Plants of the World Online

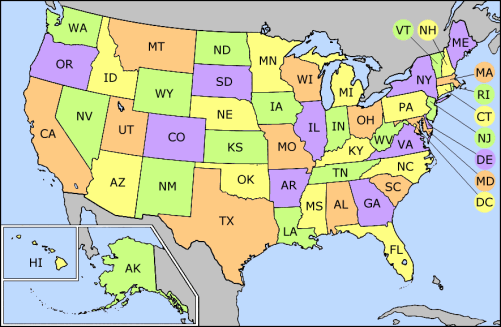

States west of the Mississippi River: AK Alaska, AR Arkansas, AZ Arizona, CA California, CO Colorado, HI Hawaii, IA Iowa, ID Idaho, KS Kansas, LA Louisiana, MN Minnesota, MO Missouri, MT Montana, ND North Dakota, NE Nebraska, NM New Mexico, NV Nevada, OK Oklahoma, OR Oregon, SD South Dakota, TX Texas, UT Utah, WA Washington, WY Wyoming

These can be divided into:

The Western states: AK, AZ, CA, CO, HI, ID, MT, NM, NV, OR, UT, WA, WY
The South Central states: AR, LA, OK, TX
The Midwestern states west of the Mississippi (including MN, which is mostly west or north of the river), also called the western Midwest: IA, KS, MN, MO, ND, NE, SD

States east of the Mississippi: AL Alabama, CT Connecticut, DE Delaware, FL Florida, GA Georgia, IL Illinois, IN Indiana, KY Kentucky, MA Massachusetts, MD Maryland, ME Maine, MI Michigan, MS Mississippi, NC North Carolina, NH New Hampshire, NJ New Jersey, NY New York, OH Ohio, PA Pennsylvania, RI Rhode Island, TN Tennessee, VA Virginia, VT Vermont, WI Wisconsin, WV West Virginia

These can be divided into:

New England: CT, MA, ME, NH, RI, VT
The Mid-Atlantic: DE, MD, NJ, NY, PA, VA, WV
The Southeast: AL, FL, GA, KY, MS, NC, SC, TN
The Midwestern states east of the Mississippi, also called the eastern Midwest: IL, IN, MI, OH, WI

== Hardwoods ==
Hardwoods
Species and a common name	Notes and commercial uses	Eastern distribution western distribution (Note: When a US region appears in this column, that means that the species has been reported in all, or all but one or two, states in the region.)	Avg height; growth rate; annual precip. minimum temperature	Tolerance to fire and shade	Landscapes and foliage
Acacia koa (koa)	An evergreen with highly valued wood, unusually colorful with a curvy grain and good woodworking properties. The tree grows naturally only in Hawaii, where it is an important part of mountainous rainforests. Uses: timber; landscaping, sap resins, veneers	— HI	110 ft (34 m); avg. growth; 50–200 in (130–510 cm) precip. 31 °F (−1 °C)	Fire: medium shade: intolerant	landscape fruiting foliage
Acer floridanum (southern sugar maple)	When competing for sunlight, the tree is most often confined to the understory. It is limited mostly to the coastal plains and the Piedmont. POWO lists this as a subspecies of Acer saccharum. Uses: timber; landscaping, palatable food, pulpwood, veneers	IL, VA and the Southeast MO and the South Central states	50 ft (15 m); avg. growth; 40–65 in (100–170 cm) precip. −18 °F (−28 °C)	Fire: intolerant shade: tolerant	landscape foliage
Acer macrophyllum (bigleaf maple)	A Pacific Coast tree with valuable wood, used to make furniture and musical instruments, especially piano frames. Uses: timber; landscaping, palatable food, veneers	— CA, OR, WA	60 ft (18 m); rapid growth; 22–260 in (56–660 cm) precip. −14 °F (−26 °C)	Fire: intolerant shade: medium	landscape foliage
Acer negundo (boxelder)	A maple species tolerant to drought and cold. It is broadly distributed in the US, but grows best in alluvial plains. Uses: landscaping, palatable food, pulpwood	All all but AK, HI	60 ft (18 m); rapid growth; 15–75 in (38–191 cm) precip. −46 °F (−43 °C)	Fire: tolerant shade: tolerant	landscape fruiting foliage
Acer nigrum (black maple)	POWO lists this as a subspecies of Acer saccharum, and the wood has similar characteristics. The tree prefers alluvial soils. Uses: timber, landscaping, palatable food, sap resins, veneers	All but FL, ME, MS, RI, SC AR, IA, KS, MN, MO, SD	100 ft (30 m); avg. growth; 24–60 in (61–152 cm) precip. −47 °F (−44 °C)	Fire: medium shade: tolerant	landscape fruiting foliage
Acer pensylvanicum (striped maple)	Easily identified by its dusky greenish bark with pale vertical streaks, the tree is often found in shady, cool valleys. Uses: landscaping	GA, KY, MI, NC, OH, SC, TN, WI, New England and the Mid-Atlantic MN	35 ft (11 m); slow growth; 24–76 in (61–193 cm) precip. −47 °F (−44 °C)	Fire: intolerant shade: tolerant	landscape foliage
Acer rubrum (red maple)	A fast-growing maple with wood of varying quality. It grows in a variety of environments up to about 3,000 ft (910 m). Uses: timber, landscaping, palatable food, pulpwood, veneers	All IA, MN, MO, OR and the South Central states	68 ft (21 m); rapid growth; 25–80 in (64–203 cm) precip. −47 °F (−44 °C)	Fire: medium shade: medium	landscape illustration of foliage
Acer saccharinum (silver maple)	Widely planted as an ornamental. The wood is softer and more brittle than in other maples. In the wild, the tree grows best in damp, well-drained alluvial soil. Uses: timber, landscaping, palatable food, veneers	All CA, NM, OR, the western Midwest and the South Central states	90 ft (27 m); rapid growth; 20–70 in (51–178 cm) precip. −47 °F (−44 °C)	Fire: intolerant shade: medium	landscape fruiting foliage
Acer saccharum (sugar maple)	The primary source of maple syrup. One of the largest and most common American maples. Uses: timber, palatable food, pulpwood, sap resins, veneers	All but FL, SC the western Midwest and the South Central states	100 ft (30 m); slow growth; 22–80 in (56–203 cm) precip. −47 °F (−44 °C)	Fire: medium shade: tolerant	landscape fruiting foliage
Aesculus flava (yellow buckeye)	The largest species of Aesculus, with light wood, used for pulp and wooden utensils. Seen most often in the Great Smoky Mountains in the southern Appalachians. The seeds contain a toxic glucoside. Uses: landscaping, pulpwood	IL, IN, OH, the Mid-Atlantic and the Southeast —	65 ft (20 m); avg. growth; 39–84 in (99–213 cm) precip. −18 °F (−28 °C)	Fire: intolerant shade: tolerant	landscape fruiting foliage
Aesculus glabra (Ohio buckeye)	The timber is often unmarketable, and the seeds contain a toxic glucoside. The tree prefers damp soil near waterways. Uses: timber, landscaping, pulpwood	AL, GA, KY, ME, MS, NH, TN, the eastern Midwest and the Mid-Atlantic the western Midwest and the South Central states	68 ft (21 m); rapid growth; 30–60 in (76–152 cm) precip. −33 °F (−36 °C)	Fire: medium shade: tolerant	landscape fruiting foliage
Alnus rubra (red alder)	A common pioneer hardwood of the coastal northwestern US. Hosts nitrogen-fixing bacteria. Uses: timber, landscaping, pulpwood, veneers	— AK, CA, ID, MT, OR, WA	90 ft (27 m); rapid growth; 24–220 in (61–559 cm) precip. −22 °F (−30 °C)	Fire: medium shade: intolerant	landscape foliage
Arbutus menziesii (Pacific madrone)	A generally non-commercial hardwood with a wide native distribution along the Pacific coast. Uses: timber, landscaping, veneers	— CA, OR, WA	80 ft (24 m); slow growth; 15–163 in (38–414 cm) precip. 13 °F (−11 °C)	Fire: tolerant shade: medium	landscape fruiting foliage
Betula alleghaniensis (yellow birch)	The most economically productive birch native to the US, used for plywood, furniture and carpentry. Often found in damp soils with good drainage in hilly terrain. Uses: timber, palatable food, veneers	GA, KY, NC, SC, TN, the eastern Midwest, New England and the Mid-Atlantic IA, MN	75 ft (23 m); slow growth; 25–80 in (64–203 cm) precip. −47 °F (−44 °C)	Fire: medium shade: medium	landscape foliage
Betula lenta (sweet birch)	The wintergreen-scented wood, which turns dark when exposed to air, was traditionally used as a substitute for mahogany. It grows at a maximum altitude of 4,500 ft (1,400 m) in its southern range. Uses: timber, pulpwood, veneers	OH, the Mid-Atlantic, New England and the Southeast —	60 ft (18 m); avg. growth; 29–80 in (74–203 cm) precip. −26 °F (−32 °C)	Fire: medium shade: intolerant	landscape foliage
Betula nigra (river birch)	Not commercially important, but its strong wood is used locally to make toys and furniture. Often planted as an ornamental. Uses: pulpwood, veneers	All but ME, RI IA, KS, MN, MO and the South Central states	70 ft (21 m); rapid growth; 30–80 in (76–203 cm) precip. −31 °F (−35 °C)	Fire: intolerant shade: intolerant	landscape foliage
Betula papyrifera (paper birch)	The birch with the broadest distribution. Commercially important for veneer and pulpwood. It grows best on sites with damp sandy loam. Uses: landscaping, palatable food, pulpwood, veneers	NC, TN, the eastern Midwest, New England and the Mid-Atlantic CO, IA, MN, ND, NE, SC and the six northernmost Western states	70 ft (21 m); rapid growth; 12–60 in (30–152 cm) precip. −62 °F (−52 °C)	Fire: intolerant shade: intolerant	landscape foliage
Carpinus caroliniana (American hornbeam)	Traditionally used to make utensils, but of little economic importance today. It grows in a variety of soils and habitats. Uses: landscaping, sap resins	All IA, MN, MO and the South Central states	30 ft (9.1 m); slow growth; 23–80 in (58–203 cm) precip. −34 °F (−37 °C)	Fire: intolerant shade: tolerant	landscape foliage
Carya aquatica (water hickory)	A dominant species in some ecologically important floodlands and wetland forests. It prefers warm, humid habitats. Uses: fuelwood (locally)	IL, IN, VA and the Southeast MO and the South Central states	85 ft (26 m); slow growth; 35–70 in (89–178 cm) precip. −18 °F (−28 °C)	Fire: medium shade: medium	landscape foliage and bark
Carya cordiformis (bitternut hickory)	A relative of the pecan, with a broader range that extends farther north. Its dark-brown, shock-resistant wood is used to make furniture, tools and ladders. It is commonly seen in swamps and damp valleys. Uses: timber, palatable food, pulpwood, sap resins, veneers	All the South Central states and the western Midwest	75 ft (23 m); slow growth; 25–70 in (64–178 cm) precip. −47 °F (−44 °C)	Fire: tolerant shade: intolerant	landscape fruiting foliage
Carya glabra (pignut hickory)	A common hickory species, often seen on hilltops and slopes. The large, nutritious nuts, along with the twigs, bark and leaves, provide food for rodents, birds, deer and other mammals. Uses: timber, palatable food, sap resins, veneers	All but ME, WI MO, NE and the South Central states	80 ft (24 m); slow growth; 30–80 in (76–203 cm) precip. −30 °F (−34 °C)	Fire: tolerant shade: medium	landscape fruiting foliage
Carya illinoinensis (pecan)	The nuts are widely used in desserts and baking, and the wood is occasionally used in furniture and carpentry. Often grows on permeable, loamy soils. Uses: timber, landscaping, palatable food, veneers	IL, IN, MD, OH, VA and the Southeast IA, KS, MO and the South Central states	120 ft (37 m); slow growth; 28–79 in (71–201 cm) precip. −21 °F (−29 °C)	Fire: intolerant shade: intolerant	landscape fruiting foliage
Carya laciniosa (shellbark hickory)	Broadly, but not commonly, distributed. The wood is used for tool handles and furniture. The nuts are the largest among the hickories, providing food for wildlife. Uses: timber, palatable food, sap resins, veneers	ME, the eastern Midwest, the Mid-Atlantic and the Southeast IA, KS, MO and the South Central states	100 ft (30 m); slow growth; 30–60 in (76–152 cm) precip. −22 °F (−30 °C)	Fire: intolerant shade: tolerant	landscape fruiting foliage
Carya myristiciformis (nutmeg hickory)	Only small populations remain of this hickory, generally found on damp, nutrient-rich soils. The nuts are high in oils and nutritious for wildlife. Uses: timber, palatable food, pulpwood, sap resins	The Southeast the South Central states	95 ft (29 m); slow growth; 40–60 in (100–150 cm) precip. −10 °F (−23 °C)	Fire: intolerant shade: intolerant	fruiting foliage
Carya ovata (shagbark hickory)	Mature specimens can be identified by the peeling bark. It grows well in humid climates. This species and Carya glabra account for much of the supply of hickory wood in the US. Uses: timber, palatable food, pulpwood, sap resins	All but FL the South Central states and the western Midwest	75 ft (23 m); slow growth; 29–80 in (74–203 cm) precip. −40 °F (−40 °C)	Fire: medium shade: medium	landscape fruiting foliage
Carya tomentosa (mockernut hickory)	The most abundant of the American hickories. The wood is hard and flexible. Often found in humid uplands. Uses: timber, palatable food, pulpwood, sap resins, veneers	All but ME, VT, WI IA, KS, MO and the South Central states	85 ft (26 m); slow growth; 32–80 in (81–203 cm) precip. −33 °F (−36 °C)	Fire: medium shade: medium	landscape foliage
Celtis laevigata (sugarberry)	Adapted to damp sandy or rocky soils. The moderately strong light-yellow wood is used in furniture. Uses: timber, landscaping, sap resins, veneers	IL, IN, MD, OH, VA, WV and the Southeast KS, MO, the South Central states and the continental Western states	80 ft (24 m); avg. growth; 20–80 in (51–203 cm) precip. −21 °F (−29 °C)	Fire: intolerant shade: tolerant	landscape fruiting foliage
Celtis occidentalis (common hackberry)	The wood is similar in quality to most elm wood. The berries persist in cold months, providing sustenance for birds and other animals. The tree thrives in a range of soils and habitats. Uses: landscaping	All but ME CO, MT, NM, UT, WY, the western Midwest and the South Central states	60 ft (18 m); rapid growth; 14–60 in (36–152 cm) precip. −47 °F (−44 °C)	Fire: tolerant shade: tolerant	landscape foliage
Cercis canadensis (eastern redbud)	A popular early-blooming ornamental and a food source for birds, wildlife and livestock. It grows best on damp, drained soils, but not on coarse sand. Uses: landscaping, palatable food	CT, MA, the eastern Midwest, the Mid-Atlantic and the Southeast IA, KS, MO, NE, NM and the South Central states	30 ft (9.1 m); slow growth; 20–80 in (51–203 cm) precip. −28 °F (−33 °C)	Fire: tolerant shade: tolerant	landscape foliage
Chrysolepis chrysophylla (giant chinquapin)	Appears mainly in forests dominated by conifers. Its marketability is hampered by difficulties in drying the wood. It grows in a range of habitats, but is rarely the dominant tree in any of them. Uses: landscaping, palatable food	— CA, OR, WA	100 ft (30 m); avg. growth; 34–130 in (86–330 cm) precip. −34 °F (−37 °C)	Fire: tolerant shade: tolerant	landscape fruiting foliage
Cornus florida (flowering dogwood)	A popular ornamental. The white or pinkish "flowers" are actually bracts. Its shallow roots do poorly on dry sites. Uses: landscaping	All but WI KS, MO and the South Central states	30 ft (9.1 m); avg. growth; 28–80 in (71–203 cm) precip. −28 °F (−33 °C)	Fire: intolerant shade: tolerant	landscape foliage
Diospyros virginiana (common persimmon)	The fruit can be fermented or used in baking. The wood is heavy, hard and smooth-grained. The tree thrives in a variety of conditions. Uses: landscaping, palatable food	All but ME, MI, NH, RI, VT, WI CA, IA, KS, MO, NE, UT and the South Central states	55 ft (17 m); slow growth; 30–80 in (76–203 cm) precip. −21 °F (−29 °C)	Fire: medium shade: tolerant	landscape foliage and fruit
Fagus grandifolia (American beech)	The wood is easily cut, shaped and treated, and is used for furniture and carpentry. The tree is common in the Mississippi and Ohio river valleys. Uses: timber, landscaping, palatable food, pulpwood, sap resins, veneers	All MN, MO, UT and the South Central states	80 ft (24 m); slow growth; 28–80 in (71–203 cm) precip. −44 °F (−42 °C)	Fire: tolerant shade: tolerant	landscape fruiting foliage
Fraxinus americana (white ash)	The most valuable timber tree of the ashes. Its many uses include baseball bats, tools, furniture and carpentry. It thrives on rich, damp soils. Uses: timber, landscaping, sap resins	All CO, IA, KS, MN, MO, NE and the South Central states	90 ft (27 m); avg. growth; 28–80 in (71–203 cm) precip. −34 °F (−37 °C)	Fire: intolerant shade: intolerant	landscape foliage
Fraxinus latifolia (Oregon ash)	The only native ash tree of the Pacific Northwest. The wood is easy to split and a good fuel source. Uses: landscaping, sap resins	— CA, OR, WA	70 ft (21 m); avg. growth; 20–118 in (51–300 cm) precip. −8 °F (−22 °C)	Fire: intolerant shade: medium	landscape fruiting foliage
Fraxinus nigra (black ash)	The wood separates easily and has often been bent and woven into baskets, hoops and furniture. Usually seen in waterlogged northern forestland. Uses: timber, sap resins, veneers	KY, the eastern Midwest, the Mid-Atlantic and New England IA, MN, ND	65 ft (20 m); slow growth; 20–50 in (51–127 cm) precip. −47 °F (−44 °C)	Fire: intolerant shade: intolerant	landscape foliage
Fraxinus pennsylvanica (green ash)	The ash with the widest distribution in the US. The wood is similar to that of white ash. Uses: timber, landscaping, sap resins	All CO, MT, NM, UT, WY, the South Central states and the western Midwest	80 ft (24 m); rapid growth; 15–71 in (38–180 cm) precip. −47 °F (−44 °C)	Fire: medium shade: tolerant	landscape foliage
Fraxinus profunda (pumpkin ash)	The common name comes from the swelling it often develops at the base of the trunk when growing in swampland or damp bottomland. The wood is used for construction timber and tool implements. Uses: timber, landscaping, sap resins	All but WI, WV and New England AR, LA, MO	120 ft (37 m); rapid growth; 36–70 in (91–178 cm) precip. −24 °F (−31 °C)	Fire: intolerant shade: medium	landscape foliage
Gleditsia triacanthos (honeylocust)	Some thornless varieties are popular urban ornamentals, especially near pavement or where only partial shade is desired. Often seen in damp bottomlands or limestone soils. Uses: timber, landscaping, pulpwood	All all but AK, HI, OR, WA	70 ft (21 m); rapid growth; 20–70 in (51–178 cm) precip. −36 °F (−38 °C)	Fire: tolerant shade: intolerant	landscape fruiting foliage
Gordonia lasianthus (loblolly bay)	Found in acidic and swampy soils near the Gulf and southern Atlantic coasts. Popular as an ornamental for its profuse flowers. Uses: landscaping, pulpwood	The Southeast —	65 ft (20 m); slow growth; 44–70 in (110–180 cm) precip. −4 °F (−20 °C)	Fire: intolerant shade: tolerant	landscape foliage
Halesia carolina (Carolina silverbell)	Flourishes in the southern Appalachians. The light, fine-grained wood is used in veneers, carpentry, and kitchen utensils and implements. Uses: timber; pulpwood, veneers	AL, FL, GA, MS, NY, SC —	30 ft (9.1 m); avg. growth; 40–80 in (100–200 cm) precip. −10 °F (−23 °C)	Fire: intolerant shade: tolerant	landscape foliage
Ilex opaca (American holly)	Planted as an ornamental and for winter holiday decorations. The red berries attract white-tailed deer and many bird species. The range overlaps that of loblolly and shortleaf pine. Uses: landscaping, pulpwood, veneers	All but ME, MI, NH, VT, WI MO and the South Central states	40 ft (12 m); slow growth; 40–80 in (100–200 cm) precip. −20 °F (−29 °C)	Fire: medium shade: tolerant	landscape fruiting foliage
Juglans cinerea (butternut)	Maple-butternut candy is traditional in New England. The wood has been used for carpentry and furniture, but populations of the tree are declining. Uses: timber, landscaping, palatable food, pulpwood, veneers	All but FL AR, IA, MN, MO	80 ft (24 m); rapid growth; 25–80 in (64–203 cm) precip. −33 °F (−36 °C)	Fire: intolerant shade: intolerant	landscape fruiting foliage
Juglans nigra (black walnut)	Natural groves are scarce from overlogging, but those remaining are valuable sources of veneers. Uses: timber, landscaping, palatable food, veneers	All but VT CO, NM, UT, the South Central states and the western Midwest	100 ft (30 m); rapid growth; 30–60 in (76–152 cm) precip. −28 °F (−33 °C)	Fire: intolerant shade: intolerant	landscape fruiting foliage
Liquidambar styraciflua (sweetgum)	A common tree in Southeastern bottomland. The scented sap is used in medicines and perfumes, and the wood is used for carpentry and utensils. Uses: timber, landscaping, pulpwood, sap resins, veneers	All but ME, MI, NH, VT, WI CA, MO and the South Central states	100 ft (30 m); rapid growth; 40–60 in (100–150 cm) precip. −21 °F (−29 °C)	Fire: intolerant shade: intolerant	landscape fruiting foliage
Liriodendron tulipifera (tuliptree)	A common ornamental, and also in demand as a fast-growing source of light wood for construction and furniture. The tree is most common on the lower slopes of the Appalachians and in the Piedmont. Uses: timber, landscaping, pulpwood, sap resins, veneers	All but ME, NH, WI IA, MO and the South Central states	120 ft (37 m); rapid growth; 30–80 in (76–203 cm) precip. −18 °F (−28 °C)	Fire: intolerant shade: intolerant	landscape foliage
Maclura pomifera (osage orange)	Valued for providing decay-resistant fence posts. From the mid-1800s until the adoption of barbed wire, it was widely used for prairie hedges. Uses: landscaping	All but ME, NH, VT CA, CO, NM, OR, UT, WA, the South Central states and the western Midwest	35 ft (11 m); avg. growth; 24–40 in (61–102 cm) precip. −23 °F (−31 °C)	Fire: medium shade: intolerant	landscape fruiting foliage
Magnolia acuminata (cucumber tree)	A common ornamental, with the widest distribution in the US among native magnolias. The wood is similar to tuliptree. Uses: timber, landscaping	All but DE, ME, MI, NH, RI, VT, WI MO and the South Central states	100 ft (30 m); rapid growth; 35–60 in (89–152 cm) precip. −16 °F (−27 °C)	Fire: intolerant shade: medium	landscape fruiting foliage
Magnolia fraseri (mountain magnolia)	A small ornamental tree of the southern Appalachians, with large white flowers. Uses: timber, landscaping, pulpwood	NY, OH, VA, WV and the Southeast —	75 ft (23 m); rapid growth; 40–80 in (100–200 cm) precip. −13 °F (−25 °C)	Fire: intolerant shade: medium	landscape foliage
Magnolia grandiflora (southern magnolia)	An ornamental tree in the Southeast, and increasingly common worldwide, with large perfumed white flowers and leathery evergreen leaves. It is resistant to damage by high winds and air pollutants, such as sulfur dioxide. Uses: timber, landscaping	MD, PA, VA and the Southeast the South Central states	100 ft (30 m); avg. growth; 35–60 in (89–152 cm) precip. 7 °F (−14 °C)	Fire: intolerant shade: tolerant	landscape foliage
Magnolia virginiana (sweetbay)	Often seen on wet or acid soils of the coastal plains. More tolerant of wet and dry soils than other magnolias. Sometimes confused with loblolly-bay or redbay. Uses: landscaping, pulpwood, veneers	MA, the Mid-Atlantic and the Southeast the South Central states	60 ft (18 m); avg. growth; 40–80 in (100–200 cm) precip. 17 °F (−8 °C)	Fire: intolerant shade: medium	landscape foliage
Metrosideros polymorpha (ohia lehua)	The most widely distributed tree in Hawaii, and generally the first to appear on new lava deposits. Often starts its life cycle as an epiphyte. Uses: timber, sap resins	— HI	65 ft (20 m); slow growth; 20–450 in (51–1,143 cm) precip. 22 °F (−6 °C)	Fire: intolerant shade: intolerant	landscape foliage
Morus rubra (red mulberry)	Widespread across the eastern US. The wood is used locally for furniture, carpentry and posts, but the tree is best known for its fruit, used in desserts, preserves and drinks. Uses: timber, landscaping, palatable food, veneers	All but ME, NH the South Central states and the western Midwest	70 ft (21 m); avg. growth; 35–60 in (89–152 cm) precip. −33 °F (−36 °C)	Fire: medium shade: tolerant	landscape fruiting foliage
Nyssa aquatica (water tupelo)	A tupelo of flood plains and swamps mainly of the Southeast and South Central states. Used commercially to make furniture and boxes. Uses: timber, pulpwood	IL, VA and the Southeast MO and the South Central states	100 ft (30 m); avg. growth; 40–60 in (100–150 cm) precip. −23 °F (−31 °C)	Fire: intolerant shade: intolerant	landscape foliage
Nyssa ogeche (Ogeechee tupelo)	An uncommon tree that prefers wet soils of the coastal plains. Valued mostly for its fruits and honey. Uses: palatable food	AL, FL, GA, SC —	50 ft (15 m); rapid growth; 45–60 in (110–150 cm) precip. −8 °F (−22 °C)	Fire: intolerant shade: intolerant	landscape fruiting foliage
Nyssa sylvatica (blackgum)	An important food source for wildlife. It prefers lightweight soils of both upland and bottomland and is used for boxes, posts and piers. Uses: landscaping	All KS, MO and the South Central states	95 ft (29 m); avg. growth; 40–60 in (100–150 cm) precip. −18 °F (−28 °C)	Fire: intolerant shade: tolerant	landscape fruiting foliage
Ostrya virginiana (hophornbeam)	A short understory tree that tolerates a wide variety of soils. Not an evergreen, but it retains its leaves for much of the winter. Used for landscaping and to make tools. Uses: landscaping, sap resins	All WY, the western Midwest and the South Central states	45 ft (14 m); slow growth; 18–60 in (46–152 cm) precip. −38 °F (−39 °C)	Fire: medium shade: tolerant	landscape fruiting foliage
Oxydendrum arboreum (sourwood)	A mid-canopy and understory tree of the Appalachians and Piedmont. Also known as a lily-of-the-valley tree for its flowers, which are a source of honey in some areas. Uses: landscaping	IL, IN, OH, RI, the Southeast and the Mid-Atlantic AR, LA	35 ft (11 m); slow growth; 30–40 in (76–102 cm) precip. −13 °F (−25 °C)	Fire: medium shade: tolerant	landscape fruiting foliage
Persea borbonia (redbay)	Often seen in swamp forests of the coastal plains. An evergreen tree with leaves that are sometimes used as a seasoning. POWO classifies this species as Tamala borbonia. Uses: landscaping, palatable food	The Southeast the South Central states	70 ft (21 m); avg. growth; 40–80 in (100–200 cm) precip. 7 °F (−14 °C)	Fire: intolerant shade: tolerant	landscape fruiting foliage
Platanus occidentalis (American sycamore)	Used mainly for pulp and for rough, sturdy timber, including in butcher blocks. It is used for soil regeneration, but thrives best in rich alluvial soils. Sometimes confused with other Platanus trees or with the sycamore maple (Acer pseudoplatanus). Uses: timber, landscaping	All IA, KS, MO, NE, WA and the South Central states	100 ft (30 m); rapid growth; 30–80 in (76–203 cm) precip. −34 °F (−37 °C)	Fire: intolerant shade: medium	landscape foliage
Populus balsamifera (balsam poplar)	Thrives on flood plains, but also grows on upland soil. The light wood is used for pulp and lightweight construction. Uses: timber, pulpwood	The eastern Midwest, the Mid-Atlantic and New England IA, MN, ND, SD and the continental Western states	80 ft (24 m); rapid growth; 6–70 in (15–178 cm) precip. −79 °F (−62 °C)	Fire: intolerant shade: intolerant	landscape foliage
Populus deltoides (eastern cottonwood)	Sometimes classified as a species, sometimes as the subspecies deltoides. A large, fast-growing tree with light wood that prefers damp silt or fine sand. Uses: timber, pulpwood, veneers	All AZ, CO, MT, NM, UT, WY, the western Midwest and the South Central states	190 ft (58 m); rapid growth; 18–55 in (46–140 cm) precip. −43 °F (−42 °C)	Fire: medium shade: intolerant	landscape fruiting foliage
Populus grandidentata (bigtooth aspen)	Thrives in alluvial soils and, in higher elevations, in sandy soils. The light wood is suited for pulp. The leaves, flower buds and small shoots feed grouse, moose and other wildlife. Uses: timber, pulpwood, veneers	KY, NC, TN, the eastern Midwest, the Mid-Atlantic and New England IA, MN, MO, ND	65 ft (20 m); rapid growth; 20–70 in (51–178 cm) precip. −43 °F (−42 °C)	Fire: intolerant shade: intolerant	landscape foliage
Populus heterophylla (swamp cottonwood)	Can tolerate submerged soils, unlike other native poplars. It is not often felled for its wood, but when it is, the wood is similar to, and often sold with, eastern cottonwood. Uses: pulpwood, veneers	All but ME, NH, VT, WI, WV AR, LA, MO	100 ft (30 m); avg. growth; 35–60 in (89–152 cm) precip. −23 °F (−31 °C)	Fire: intolerant shade: intolerant	landscape foliage
Populus tremuloides (quaking aspen)	Native to every region of the US. An important source of pulp and engineered wood products. Often used in landscaping, but the aggressive roots can damage nearby structures. Uses: timber, landscaping, pulpwood, veneers	NC, KY, the eastern Midwest, the Mid-Atlantic and New England AR, TX, the continental Western states and the western Midwest	65 ft (20 m); rapid growth; 7–60 in (18–152 cm) precip. −70 °F (−57 °C)	Fire: intolerant shade: intolerant	landscape foliage
Prunus pensylvanica (pin cherry)	An important pioneer species, sometimes called fire cherry for its use in reforestation after wildfires. It grows in a wide variety of soils. Uses: palatable food, pulpwood	All but AL, DE, FL, MS, SC CO, IA, MN, MT, ND, SD, WY	30 ft (9.1 m); rapid growth; 16–80 in (41–203 cm) precip. −38 °F (−39 °C)	Fire: intolerant shade: intolerant	landscape fruiting foliage
Prunus serotina (black cherry)	The only native cherry tree harvested commercially for wood, mainly on the Allegheny Plateau. Wilted leaves contain the toxin cyanide. Uses: timber, landscaping, palatable food, sap resins, veneers	All AZ, NM, WA and the western Midwest	80 ft (24 m); rapid growth; 21–50 in (53–127 cm) precip. −33 °F (−36 °C)	Fire: medium shade: intolerant	landscape foliage
Quercus alba (white oak)	Yields high-quality wood that tolerates a range of soils. The acorns are an important food source for more than 180 wildlife species. Uses: timber, landscaping, sap resins, veneers	All the South Central states and the western Midwest	100 ft (30 m); slow growth; 30–80 in (76–203 cm) precip. −43 °F (−42 °C)	Fire: medium shade: medium	landscape fruiting foliage
Quercus bicolor (swamp white oak)	Generally found in bottomlands and waterlogged areas. The wood is similar to, but knottier than, white oak wood. Uses: timber, landscaping, sap resins, veneers	All but FL, GA IA, MN, MO	100 ft (30 m); rapid growth; 36–48 in (91–122 cm) precip. −28 °F (−33 °C)	Fire: intolerant shade: medium	landscape foliage
Quercus chrysolepis (canyon live oak)	A tall tree in ideal conditions, but tends to be shrubby on exposed or dry slopes. Pioneering settlers in California used the wood for tools, furniture and fuel. Uses: landscaping, veneers	— AZ, CA, NM, NV, OR	90 ft (27 m); slow growth; 6–110 in (15–279 cm) precip. 11 °F (−12 °C)	Fire: tolerant shade: tolerant	landscape fruiting foliage
Quercus coccinea (scarlet oak)	A timber tree with striking autumn colors that tolerates a range of soils and conditions. Uses: timber, landscaping, sap resins, veneers	All but FL AR, LA, MO	70 ft (21 m); rapid growth; 30–55 in (76–140 cm) precip. −28 °F (−33 °C)	Fire: medium shade: intolerant	landscape fruiting foliage
Quercus douglasii (blue oak)	Accounts for a significant amount of the oak forestland in California. The wood is strong, but not often harvested because of the short, irregular trunks. Uses: palatable food	— CA	60 ft (18 m); slow growth; 10–60 in (25–152 cm) precip. 10 °F (−12 °C)	Fire: tolerant shade: intolerant	landscape fruiting foliage
Quercus falcata (southern red oak)	Frequently seen on uplands in the southern states. The wood is coarse-grained and hard. Uses: timber, veneers	All but MI, WI and New England MO and the South Central states	75 ft (23 m); avg. growth; 40–80 in (100–200 cm) precip. −13 °F (−25 °C)	Fire: tolerant shade: medium	landscape foliage
Quercus garryana (Oregon white oak)	Usually seen inland from the Pacific coast. Used locally for furniture and carpentry. Uses: timber, palatable food, sap resins	— CA, OR, WA	80 ft (24 m); slow growth; 10–104 in (25–264 cm) precip. −33 °F (−36 °C)	Fire: tolerant shade: intolerant	landscape fruiting foliage
Quercus kelloggii (California black oak)	Similar to northern red oak, the wood is suitable for paneling, furniture, carpentry and pallets. It has the widest distribution in California among the western oaks. Uses: timber, landscaping, palatable food, sap resins	— CA, OR	85 ft (26 m); slow growth; 12–100 in (30–254 cm) precip. −3 °F (−19 °C)	Fire: medium shade: intolerant	landscape foliage
Quercus laevis (turkey oak)	Prefers sandy, dry soils. Generally too small for commercial harvesting, but the wood makes good fuel. Uses: fuelwood (locally)	VA and the Southeast LA	40 ft (12 m); rapid growth; 40–70 in (100–180 cm) precip. −3 °F (−19 °C)	Fire: tolerant shade: intolerant	landscape fruiting foliage
Quercus laurifolia (laurel oak)	Grows in damp forests of the coastal plains. Used as an ornamental and for fuel. Uses: landscaping, pulpwood	MD, PA, VA and the Southeast the South Central states	70 ft (21 m); rapid growth; 40–70 in (100–180 cm) precip. −3 °F (−19 °C)	Fire: intolerant shade: tolerant	landscape foliage
Quercus lyrata (overcup oak)	Grows well on submerged soils of the Southeast. The timber is of variable quality. Uses: landscaping	DE, MD, IL, IN, NJ, VA and the Southeast MO and the South Central states	80 ft (24 m); avg. growth; 36–60 in (91–152 cm) precip. −23 °F (−31 °C)	Fire: intolerant shade: medium	landscape fruiting foliage
Quercus macrocarpa (bur oak)	An extensive root system helps the tree survive droughts. Most of the timber harvest is from lowlands in Iowa and Illinois. Uses: timber, landscaping	All but FL, GA, NC, SC CO, MT, NM, the western Midwest and the South Central states	100 ft (30 m); slow growth; 15–50 in (38–127 cm) precip. −38 °F (−39 °C)	Fire: tolerant shade: medium	landscape fruiting foliage
Quercus michauxii (swamp chestnut oak)	An important timber tree of the southern states, growing mostly on damp and wet bottomlands. The wood has many uses, including in basketry. Uses: timber, sap resins, veneers	DE, MD, IL, IN, NJ, VA and the Southeast MO and the South Central states	80 ft (24 m); avg. growth; 40–70 in (100–180 cm) precip. −20 °F (−29 °C)	Fire: intolerant shade: intolerant	landscape foliage
Quercus muehlenbergii (chinquapin oak)	Prefers limestone uplands and slopes with permeable soils. Not usually abundant enough for commercial harvesting. Uses: fuelwood (locally)	All but DE, ME, NH, RI NM, the South Central states and the western Midwest	70 ft (21 m); avg. growth; 20–90 in (51–229 cm) precip. −33 °F (−36 °C)	Fire: tolerant shade: intolerant	landscape fruiting foliage
Quercus nigra (water oak)	Frequently seen in lowlands, especially near waterways, in the Southeast. Used for timber and fuel. Uses: timber, landscaping, veneers	DE, MD, IL, NJ, VA and the Southeast MO and the South Central states	90 ft (27 m); rapid growth; 35–70 in (89–178 cm) precip. −20 °F (−29 °C)	Fire: intolerant shade: intolerant	landscape fruiting foliage
Quercus palustris (pin oak)	Used for fuel, pulp and railroad ties; other uses are limited because the wood can warp when drying. Found on damp and wet soils, especially clay soils of the Ohio Valley. Uses: timber, landscaping, veneers	All but AL, FL, NH, SC, VT AR, IA, KS, MO, NE, OK	100 ft (30 m); rapid growth; 32–60 in (81–152 cm) precip. −33 °F (−36 °C)	Fire: intolerant shade: intolerant	landscape fruiting foliage
Quercus phellos (willow oak)	Widely planted as an ornamental. Harvested for timber and pulp. Grows rapidly on damp alluvial soils, often near waterways. Uses: timber, landscaping, pulpwood	CT, IL, OH, the Southeast and the Mid-Atlantic MO and the South Central states	100 ft (30 m); rapid growth; 40–70 in (100–180 cm) precip. −23 °F (−31 °C)	Fire: intolerant shade: intolerant	landscape fruiting foliage
Quercus rubra (northern red oak)	A common tree in the eastern US, adapted to a variety of soils. An important source of hard, heavy timber. It is urban-tolerant and has been used for soil regeneration. Uses: timber, landscaping, sap resins, veneers	All but FL the western Midwest and the South Central states	81 ft (25 m); avg. growth; 30–80 in (76–203 cm) precip. −35 °F (−37 °C)	Fire: intolerant shade: medium	landscape fruiting foliage
Quercus shumardii (Shumard)	A large red oak that prefers damp, porous soils. The wood is marketed along with other red oak wood for furniture and carpentry. Uses: timber, sap resins, veneers	All but DE, NJ, WI and New England KS, MO and the South Central states	100 ft (30 m); avg. growth; 25–70 in (64–178 cm) precip. −22 °F (−30 °C)	Fire: tolerant shade: intolerant	landscape foliage
Quercus stellata (post oak)	Prevalent throughout the Southeast and South Central states. Sometimes planted to protect soil on stony and dry sites. Uses: timber, pulpwood, veneers	ME, MI, NH, VT, WI IA, KS, MO and the South Central states	60 ft (18 m); slow growth; 22–80 in (56–203 cm) precip. −33 °F (−36 °C)	Fire: tolerant shade: intolerant	landscape fruiting foliage
Quercus texana (Nuttall oak)	The tree is similar to pin oak and the wood is often marketed with red oak. It grows well on many soils, including clay soils with low permeability. Uses: timber, sap resins, veneers	AL, IL, KY, MS, TN MO and the South Central states	110 ft (34 m); rapid growth; 40–65 in (100–170 cm) precip. −18 °F (−28 °C)	Fire: intolerant shade: intolerant	landscape fruiting foliage
Quercus velutina (black oak)	Grows on a variety of soils in the eastern and midwestern US. The wood is often marketed with red oak. Uses: timber, veneers	All the South Central states and the western Midwest	80 ft (24 m); avg. growth; 30–80 in (76–203 cm) precip. −30 °F (−34 °C)	Fire: intolerant shade: medium	landscape fruiting foliage
Quercus virginiana (live oak)	Abundant on partly damp to partly dry soils in much of its range. The wood is strong, dense and heavy. Uses: timber, landscaping, pulpwood	VA and the Southeast LA, TX, UT	50 ft (15 m); rapid growth; 32–70 in (81–178 cm) precip. 7 °F (−14 °C)	Fire: medium shade: medium	landscape fruiting foliage
Robinia pseudoacacia (black locust)	Grows best on damp fertile limestone soils. It has become naturalized in the US. Used mostly to improve soils through nitrogen fixation, as a windbreak and for fuel. Uses: timber, landscaping, pulpwood	All all but AK, HI	60 ft (18 m); rapid growth; 16–65 in (41–165 cm) precip. −37 °F (−38 °C)	Fire: tolerant shade: intolerant	landscape foliage
Sabal palmetto (cabbage palmetto)	Tolerates a broad range of damp soils and even brackish marshes. Planted as an ornamental. The fruit is edible. Uses: landscaping, palatable food	The Southeast LA, TX	90 ft (27 m); slow growth; 30–70 in (76–178 cm) precip. 16 °F (−9 °C)	Fire: intolerant shade: tolerant	landscape fruiting foliage
Salix nigra (black willow)	The largest and the only regularly harvested native willow in the US. Also planted as an ornamental and to protect soil from eroding. The shallow roots require water access. Uses: landscaping, pulpwood	All CO, the South Central states and the western Midwest	100 ft (30 m); rapid growth; 18–80 in (46–203 cm) precip. 58 °F (14 °C)	Fire: intolerant shade: intolerant	landscape foliage
Sassafras albidum (sassafras)	Thrives in the Great Smoky Mountains on damp fertile soils in open areas. The entire tree is strongly scented, and oil from the bark has been used in perfumery. Uses: landscaping, palatable food	All IA, KS, MO and the South Central states	75 ft (23 m); avg. growth; 30–80 in (76–203 cm) precip. −27 °F (−33 °C)	Fire: tolerant shade: intolerant	landscape foliage
Tilia americana (American basswood)	Harvested for timber, especially in and around the Great Lakes. Also a nectar source for honey. Grows best on layers of fertile, damp soil. Uses: timber, landscaping, sap resins	All the western Midwest and the South Central states	100 ft (30 m); avg. growth; 21–80 in (53–203 cm) precip. −46 °F (−43 °C)	Fire: intolerant shade: tolerant	landscape foliage
Ulmus alata (winged elm)	Named for the winged seeds (samaras). The tree generally grows where other elms grow and its wood is marketed along with other elm wood. Uses: timber	IL, IN, MD, VA and the Southeast KS, MO and the South Central states	65 ft (20 m); avg. growth; 40–70 in (100–180 cm) precip. −18 °F (−28 °C)	Fire: intolerant shade: tolerant	landscape foliage
Ulmus americana (American elm)	Has not recovered from the devastation caused by Dutch elm disease over the past century. When available, the wood has many uses, including in furniture and construction. Uses: timber, pulpwood, sap resins	All CO, MT, WY, the western Midwest and the South Central states	120 ft (37 m); rapid growth; 15–70 in (38–178 cm) precip. −46 °F (−43 °C)	Fire: medium shade: medium	landscape foliage
Ulmus crassifolia (cedar elm)	Prefers damp limestone soils. The very strong wood is marketed with rock elm. Uses: timber, landscaping	FL, MS, TN MO and the South Central states	90 ft (27 m); rapid growth; 20–70 in (51–178 cm) precip. −10 °F (−23 °C)	Fire: medium shade: medium	landscape foliage
Ulmus rubra (slippery elm)	"Slippery" refers to the inner bark. The tree prefers damp, fertile soils. Susceptible to Dutch elm disease. Uses: timber, pulpwood	All CO, the western Midwest and the South Central states	85 ft (26 m); rapid growth; 21–83 in (53–211 cm) precip. −43 °F (−42 °C)	Fire: medium shade: tolerant	landscape foliage
Ulmus serotina (September elm)	Susceptible to Dutch elm disease. Not an abundant species. The wood is marketed with rock elm. Uses: timber, landscaping	AL, GA, IL, KY, MS, TN AR, OK	70 ft (21 m); rapid growth; 40–60 in (100–150 cm) precip. −21 °F (−29 °C)	Fire: medium shade: tolerant	landscape foliage
Ulmus thomasii (rock elm)	Thrives on damp loamy soils. The very hard wood is used in construction and veneers. Uses: timber, veneers	KY, TN, the eastern Midwest, the Mid-Atlantic and New England AR and the western Midwest	90 ft (27 m); avg. growth; 22–60 in (56–152 cm) precip. −46 °F (−43 °C)	Fire: intolerant shade: medium	landscape foliage
Umbellularia californica (California laurel)	Produces an oil similar to camphor that is germicidal, insecticidal and also sometimes toxic for humans. The wood is used in furniture and carpentry. Uses: timber, landscaping, palatable food, sap resins, veneers	— CA, OR	80 ft (24 m); avg. growth; 13–84 in (33–213 cm) precip. −13 °F (−25 °C)	Fire: intolerant shade: tolerant	landscape foliage

== See also ==
- List of inventoried conifers in Canada
- List of inventoried conifers in the United States
