= List of inventoried conifers in the United States =

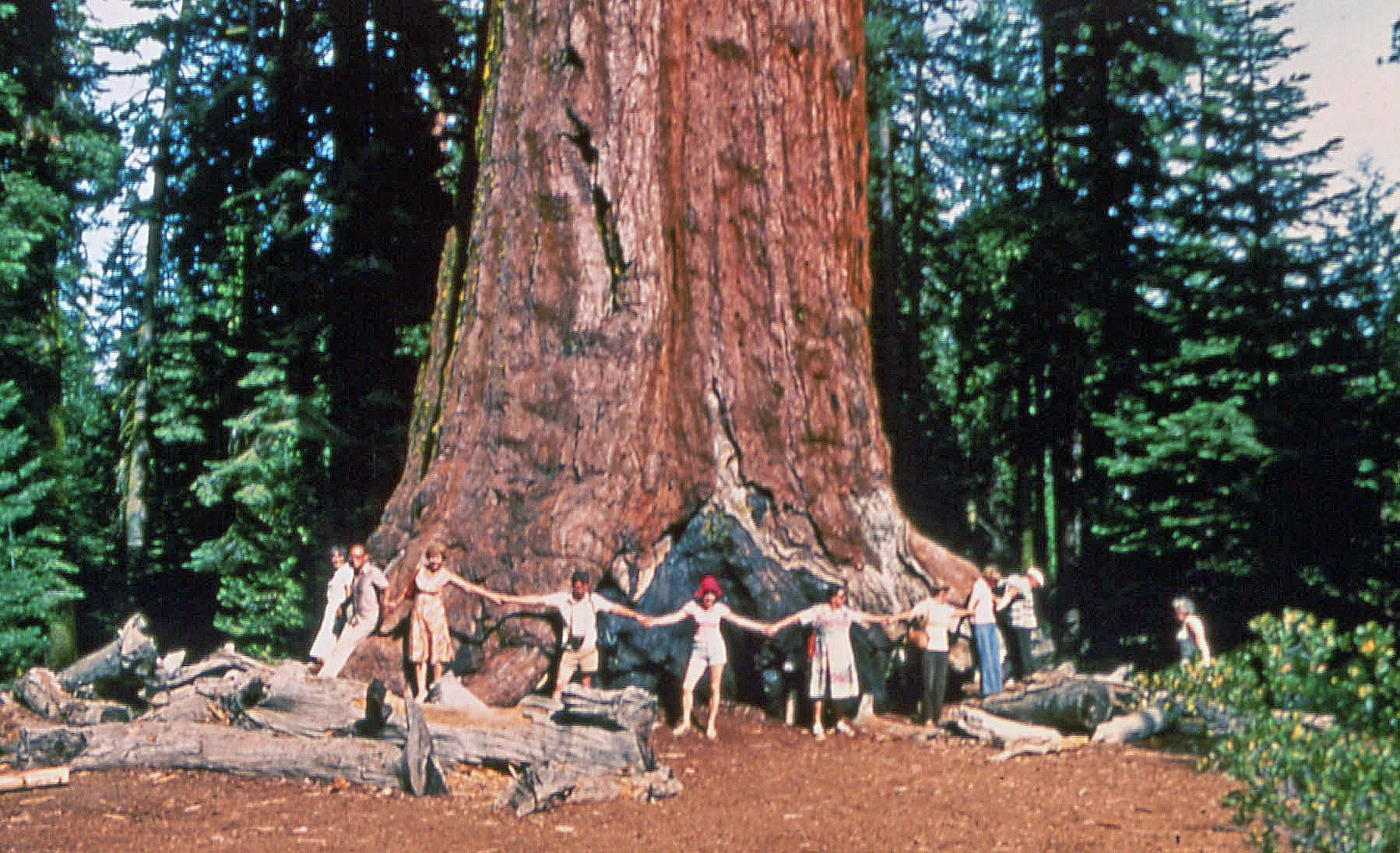
Giant sequoia

Silvics of North America (1991), a forest inventory compiled and published by the United States Forest Service, includes many conifers. (Note: The taxonomy (classification) on this page comes from Plants of the World Online except as noted, and omits hybrids and varieties. The 1991 inventory has limited coverage outside Canada and the continental United States, and is not used outside these areas in this list.) It superseded Silvics of Forest Trees of the United States (1965), which was the first extensive American tree inventory. A variety of statistics on all of these trees are maintained by the National Plant Data Team of the US Department of Agriculture.

All of the conifers in the inventory except the larches and some bald cypresses are evergreens. Apart from two species in the yew family, all are in either the pine family (including firs, larches, spruces, pines, Douglas firs and hemlocks) or the cypress family (including junipers, redwoods, giant sequoias, bald cypresses and four genera of cedars). (Note: Alaska cedars, incense cedars, white cedars and thuja cedars)

Softwood from North American conifers has a variety of commercial uses. The sturdier timber is milled for plywood, wood veneer and construction framing, including structural support beams and studs. Logs can be fashioned into posts, poles and railroad ties. Less sturdy timber is often ground and processed into pulpwood, principally for papermaking. Resins from sap yield wood tar, turpentine or other terpenes. Some resins and other tree products contain dangerous toxins (not generally listed below).

== Key ==
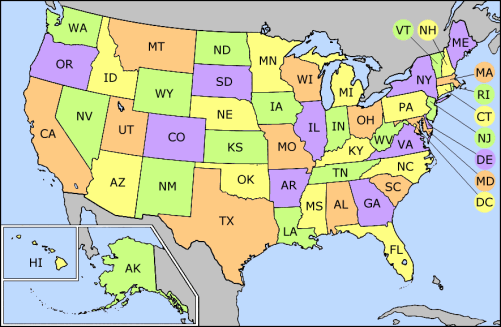

West of the Mississippi River: AK Alaska AR Arkansas AZ Arizona CA California CO Colorado IA Iowa ID Idaho KS Kansas LA Louisiana MN Minnesota MO Missouri MT Montana ND North Dakota NE Nebraska NM New Mexico NV Nevada OK Oklahoma OR Oregon SD South Dakota TX Texas UT Utah WA Washington WY Wyoming. (Hawaii is not associated with any conifer species in the 1991 inventory.)

These can be divided into:

The continental Western states: AK AZ CA CO ID MT NM NV OR UT WA WY
The South Central states: AR LA OK TX
The Midwestern states west of the Mississippi (including MN, which is mostly west or north of the river), also called the western Midwest: IA KS MN MO ND NE SD

East of the Mississippi: AL Alabama CT Connecticut DE Delaware FL Florida GA Georgia IL Illinois IN Indiana KY Kentucky MA Massachusetts MD Maryland ME Maine MI Michigan MS Mississippi NC North Carolina NH New Hampshire NJ New Jersey NY New York OH Ohio PA Pennsylvania RI Rhode Island TN Tennessee VA Virginia VT Vermont WI Wisconsin WV West Virginia

These can be divided into:

New England: CT MA ME NH RI VT
The Mid-Atlantic: DE MD NJ NY PA VA WV
The Southeast: AL FL GA KY MS NC SC TN
The Midwestern states east of the Mississippi, also called the eastern Midwest: IL IN MI OH WI

== Conifers ==
Conifers
Species and a common name	Notes and commercial uses	Eastern distribution western distribution (Note: In this list, "The [region]" means "All, or all but one or two, of the states in the [region]".) avg height; growth rate	Limits for soil pH, annual precipitation and low temperature	Tolerance to Fire and Shade	Landscapes, bark and cones with foliage
Abies amabilis (Pacific silver fir)	Can reach 230 ft (70 m) in height. The timber is lightweight, with low resin content. The species can easily be distinguished from non-fir conifers by the grey, blistery trunk and rigid branches. Uses: timber; landscaping, pulpwood, veneers, winter holiday decorations	— AK CA OR WA 165 ft (50 m); slow	pH 3.3–6.0 38–260 in (97–660 cm) −28 °F (−33 °C)	Fire: intolerant Shade: tolerant	landscape foliage and landscape bark cone and foliage
Abies balsamea (balsam fir)	A significant source of food and shelter for wildlife. Horizontal blisters in the bark contain aromatic Canada balsam. Uses: timber; landscaping, pulpwood, terpenes, veneers, winter holiday decorations	IN MI OH WI, New England and the Mid-Atlantic — 60 ft (18 m); slow	pH 4.0–6.0 13–60 in (33–152 cm) −43 °F (−42 °C)	Fire: intolerant Shade: tolerant	habit landscape bark cones and foliage
Abies concolor (white fir)	The high-grade wood is used widely for framing and plywood. Uses: timber; landscaping, pulpwood, veneers, winter holiday decorations	MA ME AZ CO ID NM NV OR UT WY 120 ft (37 m); slow	pH 5.5–7.8 18–80 in (46–203 cm) −38 °F (−39 °C)	Fire: medium Shade: medium	landscape bark cone and foliage
Abies fraseri (Fraser fir)	The only fir with a range limited to the southern Appalachians. It provides watershed protection, and is grown commercially for winter holidays. Uses: landscaping, pulpwood, veneers, winter holiday decorations	GA NC TN VA — 55 ft (17 m); moderate	pH 3.5–5.5 45–100 in (110–250 cm) −23 °F (−31 °C)	Fire: intolerant Shade: tolerant	landscape bark cone and foliage
Abies grandis (grand fir)	Can reach 230 ft (70 m) in height. The foliage has a distinct orange-like scent. The wood is soft, and not as durable as in other fir species. Uses: timber; landscaping, pulpwood, veneers, winter holiday decorations	— CA ID MT OR WA 150 ft (46 m); moderate	pH 4.5–7.5 11–100 in (28–254 cm) −33 °F (−36 °C)	Fire: tolerant Shade: tolerant	landscape bark young cones
Abies lasiocarpa (subalpine fir)	Provides habitat for wildlife and nutrition for livestock. Uses: timber; landscaping, pulpwood, winter holiday decorations	— the continental Western states 90 ft (27 m); slow	pH 4.0–6.5 20–150 in (51–381 cm) −51 °F (−46 °C)	Fire: intolerant Shade: tolerant	landscape bark cones and foliage
Abies magnifica (California red fir)	Prevalent near many natural water sources at high altitudes in California. Uses: timber; landscaping, pulpwood, veneers, winter holiday decorations	NY CA NV OR 150 ft (46 m); slow	pH 5.0–6.1 33–64 in (84–163 cm) −23 °F (−31 °C)	Fire: intolerant Shade: tolerant	landscape bark cone and foliage
Abies procera (noble fir)	Limited to the Cascade Range and coastal mountain ranges west of that range. It is the largest fir. The wood is stronger (and generally more expensive) than in other firs. Uses: timber; landscaping, pulpwood, veneers, winter holiday decorations	— CA OR WA 230 ft (70 m); rapid	pH 6.0–7.5 64–120 in (160–300 cm) −23 °F (−31 °C)	Fire: intolerant Shade: medium	landscape bark cone and foliage
Callitropsis nootkatensis (Alaska cedar)	Formerly a significant timber tree providing durable, multi-use wood. Most of the trees have already been cleared, aside from limited numbers in protected areas. It is listed as Chamaecyparis nootkatensis in the 1991 inventory. Uses: timber; landscaping	— AK CA OR WA 75 ft (23 m); slow	pH 5.5–7.0 45–100 in (110–250 cm) −22 °F (−30 °C)	Fire: intolerant Shade: tolerant	three treetops habit and foliage bark cone and foliage
Calocedrus decurrens (incense cedar)	Known as Libocedrus decurrens in the 1991 inventory. The heartwood is often used for siding. Uses: timber; posts, veneers	— CA NV OR 100 ft (30 m); slow	pH 4.6–7.1 20–80 in (51–203 cm) −25 °F (−32 °C)	Fire: intolerant Shade: medium	landscape bark cone and foliage
Chamaecyparis lawsoniana (Port Orford cedar)	Susceptible to root rot. The logs are frequently exported to Japan. As an ornamental tree, it has more than 200 known cultivars. Uses: construction	— CA OR 200 ft (61 m); moderate	pH 4.2–7.5 49–110 in (120–280 cm) −12 °F (−24 °C)	Fire: medium Shade: tolerant	landscape bark cone and foliage
Chamaecyparis thyoides (Atlantic white cedar)	Usually found in swamps and marshes. The decay-resistant wood retains commercial value in the Southeast, although harvesting has considerably reduced its acreage. Uses: timber; landscaping, posts	AL MS and every state on the Atlantic coast — 50 ft (15 m); moderate	pH 3.5–6.3 40–70 in (100–180 cm) −36 °F (−38 °C)	Fire: medium Shade: medium	landscape bark cone and foliage
Juniperus occidentalis (western juniper)	Used locally since the 19th century for durable poles and as firewood, and now also for furniture, toys and paneling. Uses: landscaping, posts, veneers	— CA ID NV OR WA 33 ft (10 m); slow	pH 6.0–8.5 8–24 in (20–61 cm) −33 °F (−36 °C)	Fire: intolerant Shade: intolerant	landscape bark cone and foliage
Juniperus scopulorum (Rocky Mountain juniper)	Usually a shrub or small tree. The wood is durable, especially when seasoned, and suitable for furniture. The resins are aromatic. Uses: landscaping, posts, veneers	— All continental states west of the Mississippi, except for AK, CA and the five states just west of the river (AR IA LA MN MO) 50 ft (15 m); slow	pH 5.0–8.5 9–26 in (23–66 cm) −38 °F (−39 °C)	Fire: intolerant Shade: intolerant	landscape bark foliage and cones
Juniperus virginiana (eastern red cedar)	An important support species for wildlife throughout its range. Although the tree has limited commercial use, the wood is highly valued for its appearance and robustness. The resins are aromatic. J. silicicola is also listed in the 1991 inventory, but this is now a synonym of a variety of J. virginiana. Uses: landscaping, posts, veneers, winter holiday decorations	All states east of the Mississippi CO KS ND NE OK OR SD TX and the five states just west of the river (AR IA LA MN MO) 50 ft (15 m); slow	pH 4.7–8.0 15–68 in (38–173 cm) −43 °F (−42 °C)	Fire: intolerant Shade: medium	landscape bark foliage and cones
Larix laricina (tamarack)	Adapted to a variety of poor soil conditions, including peatland. The tree has one of the widest distributions among North American conifers. Uses: timber; landscaping, posts, pulpwood	The eastern Midwest, New England and the Mid-Atlantic AK MN 80 ft (24 m); rapid	pH 5.5–6.5 7–55 in (18–140 cm) −79 °F (−62 °C)	Fire: intolerant Shade: intolerant	landscape bark cone and foliage
Larix lyallii (subalpine larch)	Distinguishable from western larch by its woolly buds and new growth. In its range, the subalpine larch is often found growing higher on cold mountain slopes than other trees. Uses: landscaping	— ID MT WA 40 ft (12 m); slow	pH 3.9–5.6 26–95 in (66–241 cm) −58 °F (−50 °C)	Fire: intolerant Shade: intolerant	landscape bark cone and foliage
Larix occidentalis (western larch)	The largest larch, and the most important one commercially for its timber. Also a significant source of arabinogalactan, a gum used as a thickening agent. Uses: timber; landscaping, posts, pulpwood, veneers	— ID MT OR UT WA WY 200 ft (61 m); rapid	pH 6.0–7.0 13–50 in (33–127 cm) −43 °F (−42 °C)	Fire: intolerant Shade: intolerant	landscape bark cone
Picea breweriana (Brewer spruce)	Also called "weeping spruce", for the fringe-like branchlets that hang from the horizontal branches. It is a popular tree for landscaping in Europe. Uses: timber; landscaping	— CA OR 100 ft (30 m); slow	pH 4.6–7.5 21–110 in (53–279 cm) −13 °F (−25 °C)	Fire: intolerant Shade: tolerant	landscape bark cone and foliage
Picea engelmannii (Engelmann spruce)	Typically contains many small wood knots that lower the grade of the timber. The light colour, long fibres and very low resin content contribute to the quality of its pulpwood. Uses: timber; landscaping, posts, pulpwood, terpenes, veneers	— the continental Western states 120 ft (37 m); slow	pH 6.0–8.0 21–160 in (53–406 cm) −50 °F (−46 °C)	Fire: intolerant Shade: tolerant	landscape foliage and cone
Picea glauca (Note: Of these sources, only Plants of the World Online lists this as Picea laxa.) (white spruce)	Used to build furniture, pallets and musical instruments. Uses: timber; pulpwood	MD MI NJ NY PA WI and New England AK ID MN MT SD WY 100 ft (30 m); slow	pH 4.0–8.2 7–50 in (18–127 cm) −65 °F (−54 °C)	Fire: intolerant Shade: medium	landscape bark cone and foliage
Picea mariana (black spruce)	Mainly harvested for pulpwood; construction uses are limited by the small size (for a spruce). The pale yellow wood is lightweight but strong. Uses: timber; landscaping, pulpwood, terpenes, winter holiday decorations	IL MI NJ NY PA WI and New England AK MN 65 ft (20 m); slow	pH 4.7–6.5 5–60 in (13–152 cm) −79 °F (−62 °C)	Fire: intolerant Shade: tolerant	landscape bark cones and foliage
Picea pungens (blue spruce)	The brittle wood has little economic value, but the tree's symmetry and unusual color make it a popular ornamental tree with at least 38 cultivars. Uses: landscaping, winter holiday decorations	MD ME NY PA AZ CO ID MN NM UT WY 100 ft (30 m); slow	pH 5.5–7.8 20–45 in (51–114 cm) −38 °F (−39 °C)	Fire: intolerant Shade: medium	landscape bark cone and foliage
Picea rubens (red spruce)	The straight-grained wood is lightweight but strong. It is the most popular choice in many stringed instruments for its resonance. Uses: timber; posts, pulpwood, terpenes, veneers	NC TN, the Mid-Atlantic and New England — 110 ft (34 m); moderate	pH 4.0–5.8 28–52 in (71–132 cm) −47 °F (−44 °C)	Fire: intolerant Shade: tolerant	landscape bark cones and foliage
Picea sitchensis (Sitka spruce)	The largest spruce. The strong wood is used in light aircraft, masts and turbine blades. It is also used in many musical instruments for its resonance. Uses: timber; pulpwood, terpenes	— AK CA OR WA 200 ft (61 m); moderate	pH 3.9–5.7 22–225 in (56–572 cm) −33 °F (−36 °C)	Fire: intolerant Shade: tolerant	landscape trunk cone and foliage
Pinus albicaulis (whitebark pine)	A slow-growing and long-lived pioneer species that helps reduce the movement of soil and snow. The seeds are a source of nutrition for birds, small mammals, black bears and grizzly bears. Uses: no significant economic uses	— CA ID MT NV OR WA WY 65 ft (20 m); slow	pH 4.8–8.0 18–72 in (46–183 cm) −58 °F (−50 °C)	Fire: intolerant Shade: medium	landscape bark cone and foliage
Pinus banksiana (jack pine)	Sometimes milled for utility poles and railroad ties. Uses: timber; landscaping, posts, pulpwood, terpenes	NY PA WV, the eastern Midwest and New England MN MO ND 80 ft (24 m); rapid	pH 6.0–8.2 15–35 in (38–89 cm) −53 °F (−47 °C)	Fire: intolerant Shade: intolerant	landscape bark cones and foliage
Pinus clausa (sand pine)	Grown on plantations for biofuel. Uses: timber; pulpwood, winter holiday decorations	AL FL GA MS NC TX 80 ft (24 m); slow	pH 4.2–5.5 40–65 in (100–170 cm); 2 °F (−17 °C)	Fire: intolerant Shade: medium	landscape bark cone and foliage
Pinus contorta (lodgepole pine)	Used in paneling, and sometimes milled for utility poles and railroad ties. The trees usually grow rapidly when young and can be harvested economically. Uses: timber; posts, pulpwood, terpenes, veneers	— SD and the continental Western states 99 ft (30 m); rapid	pH 6.2–7.5 18–25 in (46–64 cm) −70 °F (−57 °C)	Fire: intolerant Shade: intolerant	landscape bark (for var. latifolia) cone and foliage
Pinus echinata (shortleaf pine)	One of the most economically important softwood trees in the Southeast, providing mainly pulpwood and construction timber. Uses: timber; landscaping, posts, pulpwood, terpenes, veneers, winter holiday decorations	OH IL, the Southeast and the Mid-Atlantic MO and the South Central states 100 ft (30 m); rapid	pH 4.0–6.0 34–65 in (86–165 cm) −18 °F (−28 °C)	Fire: tolerant Shade: intolerant	landscape bark cone and foliage
Pinus edulis (twoneedle pinyon)	The large, edible seeds are the most valuable product of the tree. Many isolated communities in the southwestern US have relied on the trees for firewood. Uses: landscaping, posts, winter holiday decorations	— AZ CA CO NM NV OK TX UT WY 50 ft (15 m); slow	pH 6.5–8.5 9–27 in (23–69 cm) −31 °F (−35 °C)	Fire: intolerant Shade: intolerant	landscape bark cone and foliage
Pinus elliottii (slash pine)	Still one of the most frequently planted North American timber trees, it has supplied much of the world's demand for turpentine and resin since the 1700s. It is native to the Southeast. Uses: timber; landscaping, posts, pulpwood, terpenes, veneers	The Southeast LA TX 100 ft (30 m); rapid	pH 4.0–6.4 40–80 in (100–200 cm) −18 °F (−28 °C)	Fire: intolerant Shade: intolerant	landscape bark cone and foliage
Pinus flexilis (limber pine)	A slow-growing species not usually planted for its timber, but sometimes harvested along with other species. It is adapted to harsh climates, including windy and dry conditions, and provides the only tree cover available on some sites. The species is long-lived; one specimen was found to be 1650 years old. Uses: timber; landscaping, edible seeds	— ND NE SD and the continental Western states 66 ft (20 m); slow	pH 5.7–6.5 20–70 in (51–178 cm) −43 °F (−42 °C)	Fire: intolerant Shade: intolerant	landscape foliage bark cone and foliage
Pinus glabra (spruce pine)	Grows near water or in swampland in coastal plains. The wood is brittle, not durable, and not highly valued. Uses: timber; winter holiday decorations	AL FL GA MS SC LA 90 ft (27 m); rapid	pH 3.8–5.6 35–66 in (89–168 cm) −2 °F (−19 °C)	Fire: intolerant Shade: tolerant	landscape bark cone and foliage
Pinus jeffreyi (Jeffrey pine)	Discovered in 1852 by John Jeffrey, the tree produces wood similar in structure and quality to ponderosa pine wood. Uses: timber; landscaping, posts, pulpwood, terpenes, veneers	— CA NV OR 180 ft (55 m); rapid	pH 5.6–8.4 20–80 in (51–203 cm) −38 °F (−39 °C)	Fire: medium Shade: intolerant	landscape bark cone and foliage
Pinus lambertiana (sugar pine)	The largest and tallest pine, and one of the oldest, sometimes living 500 years or more. Mature trees often have long cones weighing down the tips of the upper branches. Uses: timber; pulpwood, veneers	— CA NV OR 229 ft (70 m); rapid	pH 5.6–8.0 25–90 in (64–229 cm) −28 °F (−33 °C)	Fire: intolerant Shade: medium	landscape bark cone and foliage
Pinus monophylla (singleleaf pinyon)	One of the slowest-growing conifers. Many of the trees are wider than they are tall. The edible seeds are harvested and sold commercially. Uses: landscaping, posts, winter holiday decorations	— AZ CA NV ID NM UT 50 ft (15 m); slow	pH 6.2–7.5 11–20 in (28–51 cm) −23 °F (−31 °C)	Fire: intolerant Shade: intolerant	landscape bark cone and foliage
Pinus monticola (western white pine)	Straight-grained, lightweight and low in resin, the timber is often used in framing and woodworking. Uses: timber; landscaping, pulpwood, terpenes, veneers	— CA ID MT NV OR UT WA 200 ft (61 m); rapid	pH 5.5–7.0 15–30 in (38–76 cm) −33 °F (−36 °C)	Fire: intolerant Shade: medium	landscape bark cones and foliage
Pinus nigra (Austrian pine)	Not a native tree, but it has been in cultivation in the US since the 1700s for timber and as an ornamental tree. Its range may extend slightly west of the Mississippi. Uses: landscaping, veneers, winter holiday decorations	IL MA MD ME MI MS NJ NY OH PA — 120 ft (37 m); moderate	pH 5.5–7.5 35–50 in (89–127 cm) −38 °F (−39 °C)	Fire: intolerant Shade: intolerant	landscape bark cone and foliage
Pinus palustris (longleaf pine)	A traditional provider of turpentine and resins for naval and other uses. Forests of these trees may once have covered 60 million acres (240,000 km^{2}), but have been reduced to less than one-fifteenth of that. Uses: timber; landscaping, posts, pulpwood, terpenes, veneers	VA and the Southeast AR LA TX 120 ft (37 m); rapid	pH 6.0–7.0 40–60 in (100–150 cm) −3 °F (−19 °C)	Fire: medium Shade: intolerant	landscape bark cone and foliage
Pinus ponderosa (ponderosa pine)	Can reach more than 70 m (230 ft) in height. It is a widely distributed tree in western North America, and one of the main sources of timber, with a relatively fast growth rate. Uses: timber; landscaping, posts, pulpwood, terpenes, veneers	— All continental states west of the Mississippi, except for AK, KS and the five states just west of the river (AR IA LA MN MO) 223 ft (68 m); moderate	pH 5.0–9.0 15–25 in (38–64 cm) −36 °F (−38 °C)	Fire: tolerant Shade: intolerant	landscape bark foliage and cones
Pinus pungens (Table Mountain pine)	Mostly valued for watershed management and pulpwood. Uses: timber; landscaping, pulpwood	GA IL MD NC NJ PA SC TN VA WV — 50 ft (15 m); slow	pH 4.5–7.0 36–60 in (91–152 cm) −18 °F (−28 °C)	Fire: intolerant Shade: intolerant	landscape bark cone and foliage
Pinus radiata (Monterey pine)	Internationally, the most widely planted pine species, mainly for timber and pulpwood. The wood tends to be lower-grade and is not widely sold in the US. Uses: landscaping, winter holiday decorations	— CA 120 ft (37 m); rapid	pH 4.5–5.2 16–30 in (41–76 cm); 23 °F (−5 °C)	Fire: intolerant Shade: medium	landscape bark cone and foliage
Pinus resinosa (red pine)	One of the fastest-growing conifer species. The wood is straight-grained and moderately hard. Some of it is milled for railroad ties and cabin logs. Uses: timber; landscaping, posts, pulpwood, veneers, winter holiday decorations	IL IN NC WI, New England and the Mid-Atlantic — 80 ft (24 m); rapid	pH 4.5–6.0 15–60 in (38–152 cm) −43 °F (−42 °C)	Fire: intolerant Shade: intolerant	landscape bark foliage and cone
Pinus rigida (pitch pine)	Rigida (rigid) refers to the needles and cone scales. The wood, which is resinous and rot-resistant, is suitable for shipbuilding, mine timbers, fencing and railroad ties. Uses: landscaping, posts, pulpwood, terpenes, winter holiday decorations	GA IL IN KY NC OH SC TN, the Mid-Atlantic and New England — 80 ft (24 m); rapid	pH 3.5–5.1 37–56 in (94–142 cm) −43 °F (−42 °C)	Fire: intolerant Shade: intolerant	landscape bark cone and foliage
Pinus sabiniana (California foothill pine)	Not widely used today, but it provided food and was crafted into baskets and drums by the Indigenous peoples of California. Uses: landscaping	— CA OR 80 ft (24 m); slow	pH 6.0–8.3 14–24 in (36–61 cm); 12 °F (−11 °C)	Fire: intolerant Shade: intolerant	landscape bark cone and foliage
Pinus serotina (pond pine)	Valued as a tree that produces pulpwood in wetter conditions than most pines will tolerate. Uses: timber; pulpwood	AL DE FL GA MD NC NJ SC VA — 80 ft (24 m); moderate	pH 4.8–6.8 40–60 in (100–150 cm) −3 °F (−19 °C)	Fire: medium Shade: intolerant	landscape bark cone and foliage
Pinus strobus (eastern white pine)	One of the most commercially important trees in eastern North America, in part due to its rapid growth. The timber is durable but soft enough for woodworking. Uses: timber; landscaping, posts, pulpwood, veneers, winter holiday decorations	All states east of the Mississippi except FL and MS — 150 ft (46 m); rapid	pH 4.0–6.5 20–80 in (51–203 cm) −33 °F (−36 °C)	Fire: intolerant Shade: medium	snowy landscape tree bark cone and foliage
Pinus sylvestris (Scots pine)	The most widely planted non-native pine species in North America, valued for winter holidays and erosion control as well as pulpwood. Its range may extend slightly west of the Mississippi. Uses: landscaping, pulpwood, winter holiday decorations	New England, the eastern Midwest and the Mid-Atlantic — 110 ft (34 m); rapid	pH 5.0–7.5 24–45 in (61–114 cm) −36 °F (−38 °C)	Fire: intolerant Shade: intolerant	landscape bark cone and foliage
Pinus taeda (loblolly pine)	The most economically valuable forest tree in the Southern US, representing more than half of the total volume of erect pines. Uses: timber; posts, pulpwood, terpenes, veneers	DE IL MD NJ OH VA and the Southeast MO and the South Central states 100 ft (30 m); rapid	pH 4.0–7.0 35–65 in (89–165 cm) −8 °F (−22 °C)	Fire: tolerant Shade: intolerant	landscape bark cone and foliage
Pinus virginiana (Virginia pine)	Formerly called "scrub pine", it has become a principal provider of timber and pulpwood in the Southeast, and a popular choice for reforestation and mine reclamation sites. Uses: timber; landscaping, posts, pulpwood, terpenes, veneers, winter holiday decorations	IL IN OH, the Mid-Atlantic and the Southeast MO 70 ft (21 m); rapid	pH 4.5–7.5 32–65 in (81–165 cm) −23 °F (−31 °C)	Fire: medium Shade: intolerant	landscape bark cone and foliage
Pseudotsuga macrocarpa (bigcone Douglas fir)	The wood is sturdy and strong but not durable. It is no longer harvested commercially for its coarse lumber. Uses: landscaping	— CA 75 ft (23 m); moderate	pH 5.0–7.0 12–40 in (30–102 cm) −13 °F (−25 °C)	Fire: intolerant Shade: intolerant	landscape bark cone and foliage
Pseudotsuga menziesii (Douglas fir)	Worldwide, one of the most commercially successful timber trees. Uses: timber; landscaping, posts, pulpwood, terpenes, veneers, winter holiday decorations	NJ NY PA MN TX and the continental Western states 200 ft (61 m); moderate	pH 5.0–7.5 18–100 in (46–254 cm) −33 °F (−36 °C)	Fire: intolerant Shade: medium	landscape bark and foliage bark cones and foliage
Sequoia sempervirens (redwood)	Closely related to the giant sequoia (Sequoiadendron), this tree relies on the wet winters and foggy summers prevalent along the central and northern coasts of California. Its decay-resistant wood and very hard bark have a variety of uses in construction and landscaping. Uses: timber; landscaping, posts, pulpwood, veneers	— CA OR 250 ft (76 m); rapid	pH 5.0–7.0 20–200 in (51–508 cm); 7 °F (−14 °C)	Fire: intolerant Shade: tolerant	landscape bark cone and foliage
Sequoiadendron giganteum (giant sequoia)	Grown as an ornamental tree in many countries. Because of the tree's extreme size and longevity and restricted natural habitat, most giant sequoia forests have been granted protected status. Uses: timber; landscaping	— CA 200 ft (61 m); slow	pH 5.5–7.5 35–55 in (89–140 cm) −24 °F (−31 °C)	Fire: intolerant Shade: intolerant	landscape bark cone and foliage
Taxodium distichum (bald cypress)	Grows on soggy or flooded ground in coastal plains in the Southern US. Often displays cypress knees near the base of the trunk. Uses: timber; landscaping, posts, terpenes	IL IN OH, the Mid-Atlantic and the Southeast MO and the South Central states 130 ft (40 m); rapid	pH 4.5–6.0 40–65 in (100–170 cm) −18 °F (−28 °C)	Fire: intolerant Shade: medium	landscape bark cone and foliage
Taxus brevifolia (western yew)	A shade-tolerant tree of the Yew family. When competing with taller and faster-growing trees, it becomes part of the undergrowth. The seed cones have red arils. Uses: landscaping, posts	— AK CA ID MT NV OR WA 40 ft (12 m); slow	pH 6.2–7.5 24–60 in (61–152 cm) −18 °F (−28 °C)	Fire: intolerant Shade: tolerant	landscape bark foliage and cones
Thuja occidentalis (arborvitae)	The termite- and rot-resistant wood, durable in a range of outdoor conditions, is used in fencing, cabin logs and roof shingles. Uses: timber; landscaping, posts, pulpwood, veneers	NC SC TN, the eastern Midwest, New England, and the Mid-Atlantic — 50 ft (15 m); slow	pH 5.2–7.0 35–55 in (89–140 cm) −33 °F (−36 °C)	Fire: intolerant Shade: medium	landscape bark foliage and cones
Thuja plicata (western redcedar)	The only native Thuja species in western North America. The lightweight, durable wood makes good insulation, and is often used in shingles and other roofing materials. Uses: timber; landscaping, posts, pulpwood, veneers	— AK CA ID MT OR WA 150 ft (46 m); slow	pH 5.1–7.1 30–120 in (76–305 cm) −33 °F (−36 °C)	Fire: intolerant Shade: tolerant	landscape tree bark foliage and cones
Torreya taxifolia (Florida nutmeg)	An endangered evergreen in the yew family. Uses: landscaping, posts, winter holiday decorations	FL GA — 40 ft (12 m); moderate	pH 5.0–7.0 30–60 in (76–152 cm); 12 °F (−11 °C)	Fire: intolerant Shade: tolerant	Seed and foliage pictured, lower right (not cone)
Tsuga canadensis (eastern hemlock)	Shade-tolerant, long-lived and slow-growing. Historically, it provided tannin for curing leather. Uses: timber; landscaping, pulpwood	AL GA IN MI NC OH SC TN WI, the Mid-Atlantic and New England — 105 ft (32 m); slow	pH 4.2–5.7 32–55 in (81–140 cm) −33 °F (−36 °C)	Fire: medium Shade: tolerant	landscape bark foliage and cones
Tsuga heterophylla (western hemlock)	Used widely in construction. It is also a good source of wood fibre. Uses: timber; landscaping, pulpwood, veneers	— AK CA ID MT OR WA 170 ft (52 m); slow	pH 4.5–6.0 38–150 in (97–381 cm) −23 °F (−31 °C)	Fire: intolerant Shade: tolerant	forest landscape bark foliage and cone
Tsuga mertensiana (mountain hemlock)	Grows well in snow-covered subalpine zones. Uses: timber; landscaping, pulpwood, veneers	— AK CA ID MT NV OR WA 125 ft (38 m); slow	pH 4.5–7.3 42–140 in (110–360 cm) −18 °F (−28 °C)	Fire: intolerant Shade: tolerant	landscape bark cone and foliage

== See also ==
- List of gymnosperm families
- List of inventoried conifers in Canada
- List of inventoried hardwoods in the United States
