= Ulmus alata 'Lace Parasol' =

Elm cultivar

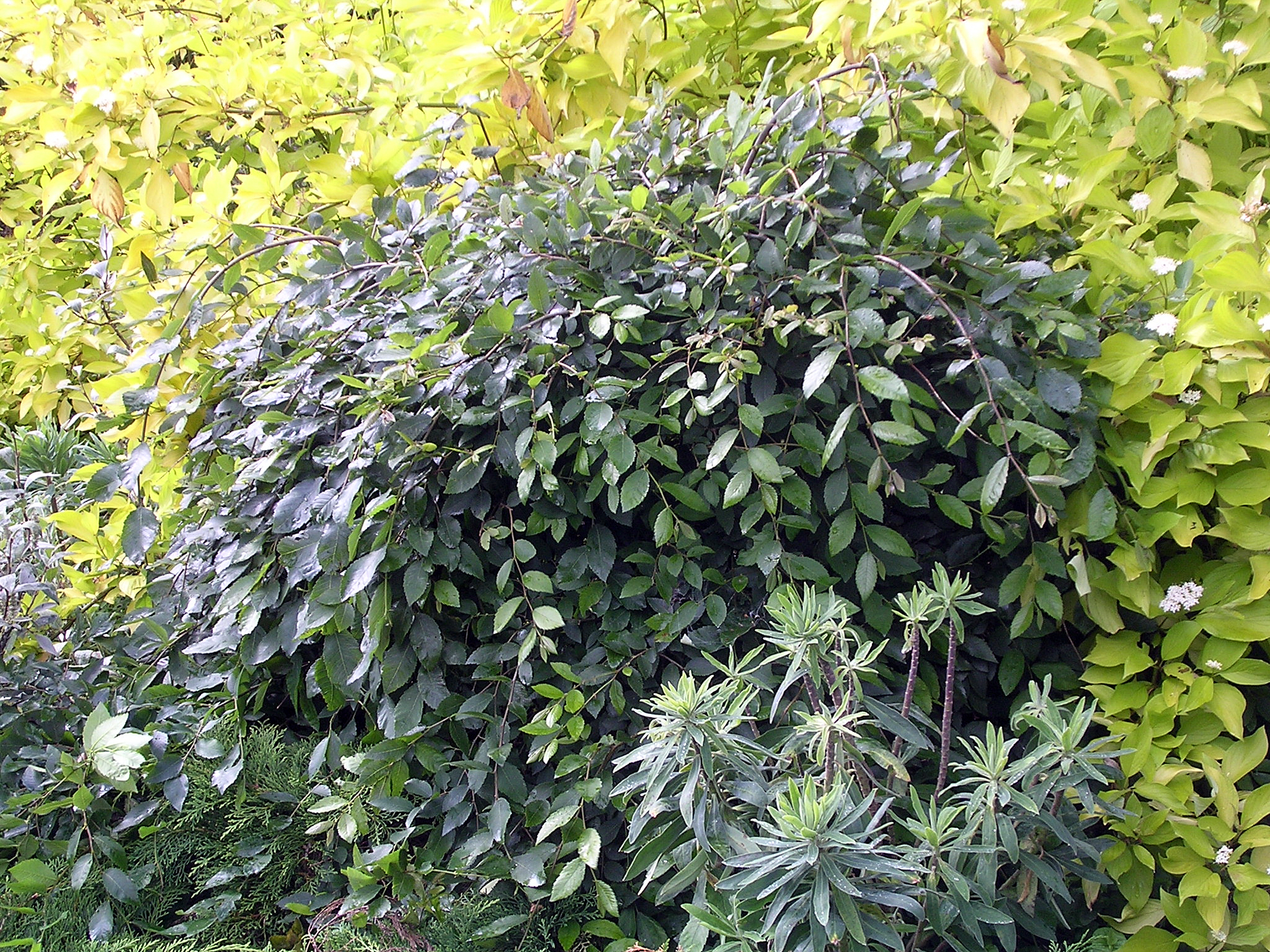
- Lace Parasol aged 14 years (height < 60 cm), Sir Harold Hillier Gardens, UK
- Species: Ulmus alata
- Cultivar: 'Lace Parasol'
- Origin: North Carolina, USA

The winged elm cultivar Ulmus alata 'Lace Parasol' was found by a North Carolina nurseryman growing in local woods. Removed to his yard, it remained there until his death, when it was removed again to the North Carolina State Arboretum in Raleigh by J. C. Raulston.

== Description ==
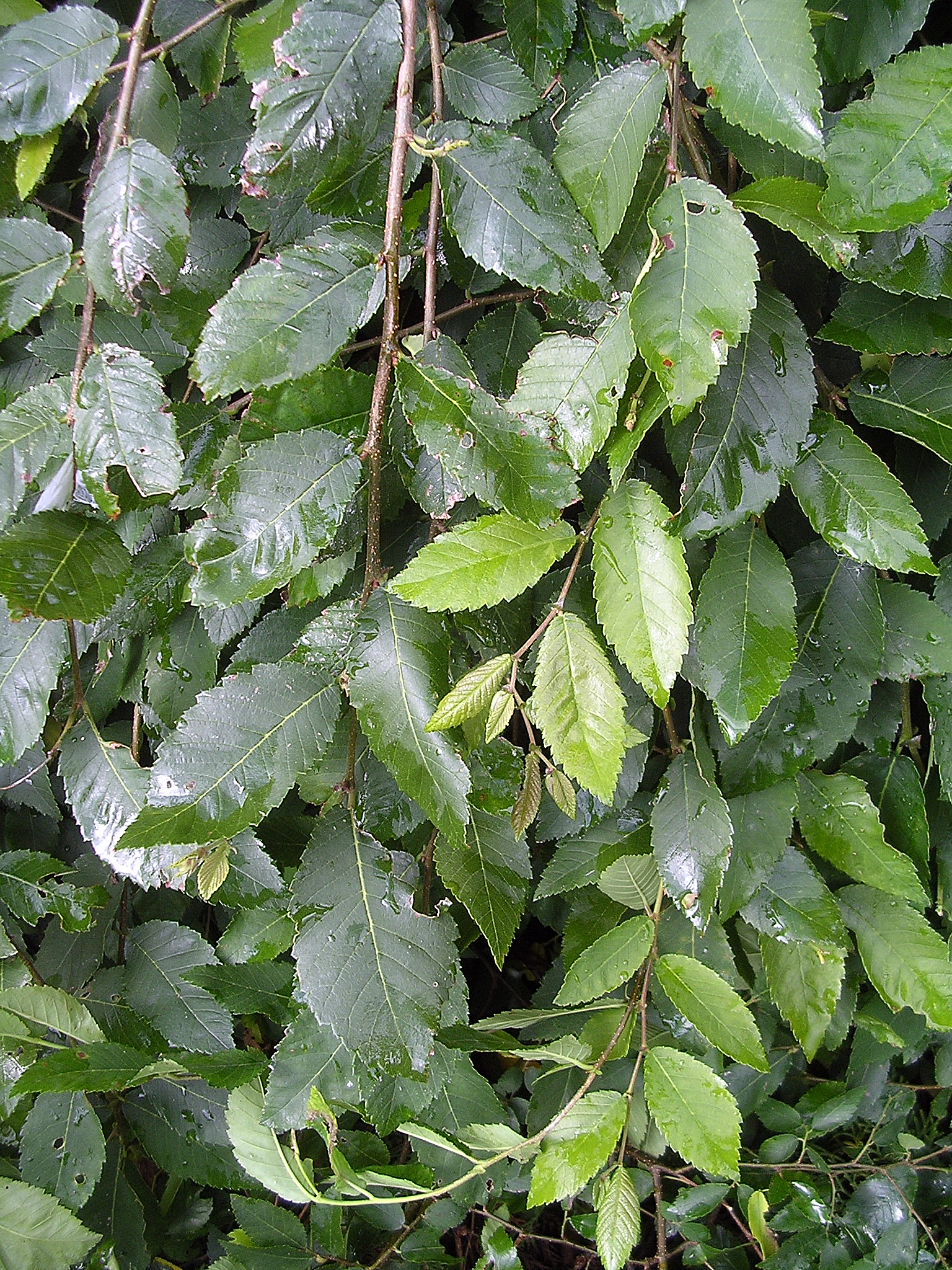

'Lace Parasol' is a very slow-growing, rounded, weeping form. The original tree is now over 50 years old, but remains only 10 ft (3 m.) in height and spread, resembling a mature Acer palmatum but with an ornamental bark. The specimen at the Sir Harold Hillier Gardens in southern England had attained a height of only 60 cm 14 years after it was planted in the Winter Garden. The foliage turns a vivid yellow in autumn. Trees raised for sale are usually grafts on either U. alata or U. parvifolia rootstock.

== Pests and diseases ==
Owing to its diminutive height, the tree is unattractive to the Scolytus beetles which act as vectors of Dutch elm disease and therefore unlikely to become infected.

== Cultivation ==
The tree only known to be in commerce in the USA. A single specimen is known to be in cultivation in Europe.

== Accessions ==
=== North America ===
- Brookside Gardens. Acc. no. 98-258
- North Carolina State University Arboretum see text
- Scott Arboretum. Acc. no. 2003-172
- U S National Arboretum , Washington, D.C., United States. Acc. no. 57846

=== Europe ===
- Sir Harold Hillier Gardens, UK. Acc. no. 1994.0634

== Nurseries ==
=== North America ===
- Foothills Nursery , Mt. Airy, North Carolina
- PendulousPlants, Horse Shoe, North Carolina
