= List of gymnosperm families =

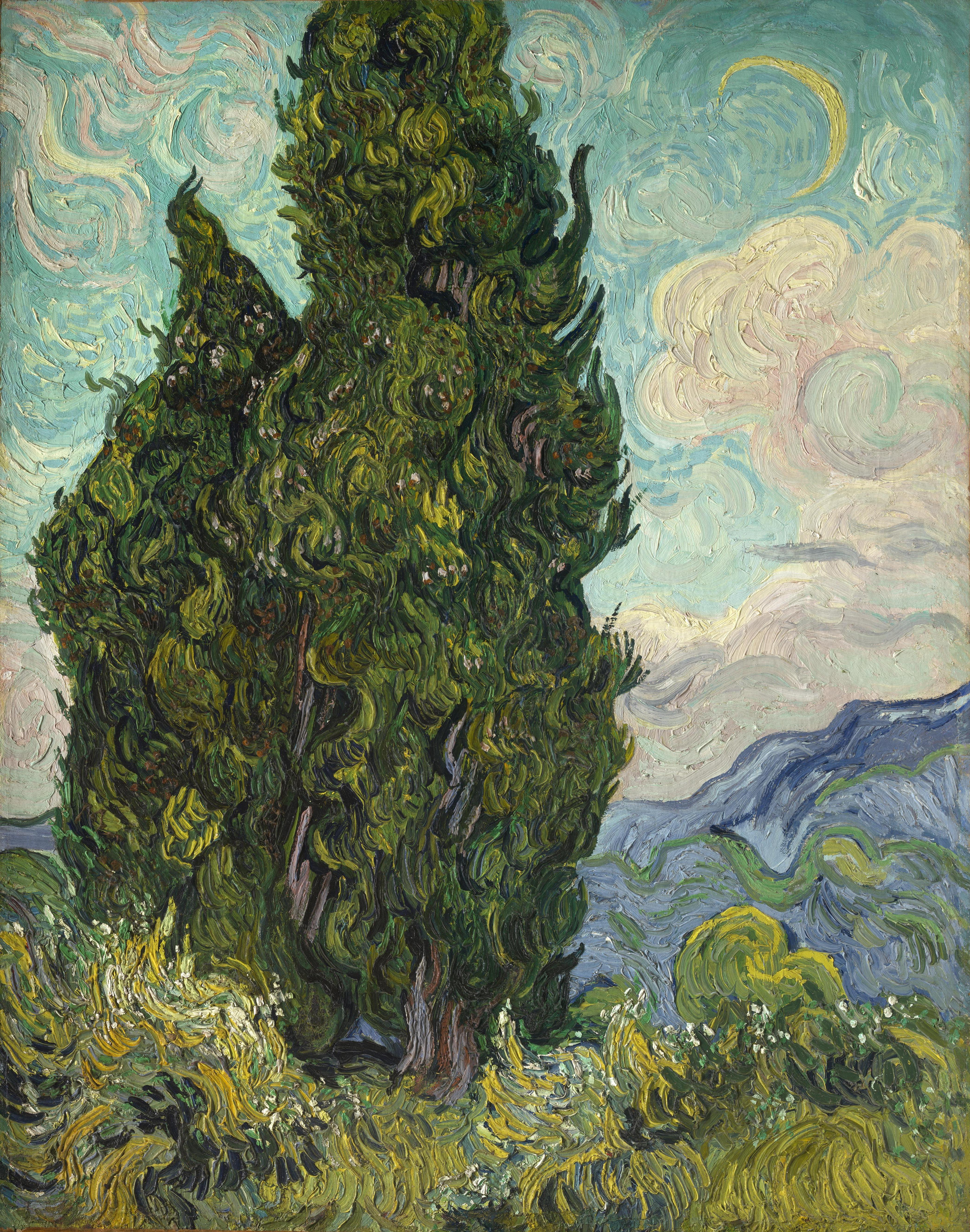
Cypresse, painted by Vincent van Gogh

The gymnosperms consist of five orders of seed plants, Cupressales, Cycadales, Ginkgoales, Gnetales and Pinales. (Note: The taxonomy (classification) in this list follows the Gymnosperm section of the Angiosperm Phylogeny Website, and largely follows Plants of the World (2017). Total counts of genera for each family come from Plants of the World Online (POWO). (See the POWO license.) Extinct taxa are not included.) They developed more than 350 million years ago, long before flowering plants, according to the fossil record. The name comes from the Greek for "naked seed"; the egg cells are not protected by ovaries, as in flowering plants.

All current gymnosperms are woody perennial plants, though herbaceous gymnosperm fossils are known from the Triassic period. Gymnosperms are divided into twelve extant families of trees, shrubs, and woody vines. Sequoiadendron giganteum, the giant redwood, is the largest tree in the world, Sequoia sempervirens, the coastal redwood, is the tallest, and Pinus longaeva the oldest. Ginkgo trees tolerate urban pollutants well, and are often planted in and near cities. The pine family is the main source of softwood timber, paper pulp and turpentine. The flexible wood of the yew family is used in longbows and musical instruments.

== Glossary ==
From the glossary of botanical terms:

- deciduous: falling seasonally, as with bark, leaves, or petals
- evergreen: leaves persisting long enough that the plant is never without foliage at any time of the year
- unisexual: of one sex; bearing only male or only female reproductive organs
- woody: hard and lignified; not herbaceous

== Families ==
Families
Family and a common name (Note: Each family's formal name ends in the Latin suffix -aceae and is derived from the name of a genus that is or once was part of the family.)	Type genus and etymology (Note: Some plants were named after naturalists (unless otherwise noted).)	Total genera; global distribution	Description and uses	Order	Type genus images
Araucariaceae (kauri-tree family)	Araucaria, after the Araucano people (Mapuche)	3 genera, mostly in the Southern Hemisphere in southern South America, parts of the southwestern Pacific, and locally southeast Asia (Indonesia, Philippines)	Evergreen trees growing to 5–70 m tall, usually with whorled branches. Many of the larger species are harvested for timber.	Cupressales	Araucaria araucana
Cupressaceae (cypress family)	Cupressus, from Greek and Latin plant names	30 genera, widespread in the Northern Hemisphere, and scattered in the Southern Hemisphere in tropical to southern temperate zones	Trees and shrubs, 0.3–118 m tall. Taxodium is an aquatic tree genus with roots that form knees in some species. Many species provide timber that resists fungal and termite damage.	Cupressales	Cupressus sempervirens
Cycadaceae (sago family)	Cycas, from a Greek plant name	1 genus, scattered widely around Southeast Asia, northern Australia, and parts of India and Africa	Unisexual trunked plants with leaf bases that periodically sprout new leaves. The raw plants are toxic for humans, but carefully prepared starches from some species are added to certain Asian dishes.	Cycadales	Cycas revoluta
Ephedraceae (ephedra family)	Ephedra, from Greek and Latin plant names	1 genus, in arid zones in northern temperate regions and the Andes and other parts of South America	Mostly unisexual shrubs and vines. Generally, photosynthesis occurs in the branches rather than the leaves. Many plants contain the medicinal compound ephedrine.	Gnetales	Ephedra distachya
Ginkgoaceae (ginkgo family)	Ginkgo, from Chinese and Japanese plant names	1 genus, in eastern China	Deciduous unisexual trees with fan-like leaves, 20–35 m tall. Trees nearly identical to the modern Ginkgo are frequently found in the fossil record from the Mesozoic Era.	Ginkgoales	Ginkgo biloba
Gnetaceae (gnetum family)	Gnetum, from a Maluku or Malay plant name	1 genus, scattered in the tropics	Unisexual woody vines, and occasionally trees. At least two species are cultivated or gathered for food in Africa and Indonesia. Some plants provide fibre and wood.	Gnetales	Gnetum edule
Pinaceae (pine family)	Pinus, from a Latin plant name	11 genera, widespread in the Northern Hemisphere, marginal in the Southern Hemisphere (Sumatra)	Evergreen and deciduous conifers, mostly trees and some shrubs, 1–100 m tall; often with heavily scented resin. Leaves are needle-shaped or linear. Many of the larger species are harvested for timber; several species are grown commercially for pine nuts. Many species are grown as ornamental plants, and also for christmas trees.	Pinales	Pinus sylvestris
Podocarpaceae (yellowwood family)	Podocarpus, from Greek for "stalked fruit"	20 genera, scattered in the Southern Hemisphere, and locally in the Northern Hemisphere in east and southeast Asia, and in and near Central America and the Caribbean	Evergreen trees and shrubs, 0.2–60 m tall, with a few species that grow in water or on other plants. Timber production has decreased due to overharvesting.	Cupressales	Podocarpus elongatus
Sciadopityaceae (kōyamaki family)	Sciadopitys, from Greek for "umbel" or "parasol" (the leaves) + "pine"	1 genus, in Japan	Evergreen trees to 40 m tall with unisexual cones and photosynthetic branchlets	Cupressales	Sciadopitys verticillata
Taxaceae (yew family)	Taxus, from a Latin plant name	5 genera, scattered mainly in the Northern Hemisphere	Evergreen shrubs and trees 1–40 m tall with berry-like cones, seed toxic in some species	Cupressales	Taxus baccata
Welwitschiaceae (tumbo family)	Welwitschia, after Friedrich Welwitsch (1806–1872)	1 genus, in desert regions of southwestern Africa near the coast	Unisexual plants with short, concave stems and two (occasionally three) large torn leaves. Some individuals live for more than a thousand years.	Gnetales	Welwitschia mirabilis
Zamiaceae (coontie family)	Zamia, from a Latin plant name	9 genera, scattered widely in the tropics and subtropics	Unisexual trunked plants with leaf bases that periodically sprout new leaves. Seeds of Dioon edule are prepared and used in some tortillas.	Cycadales	Zamia pumila

== See also ==
- List of plant family names with etymologies
