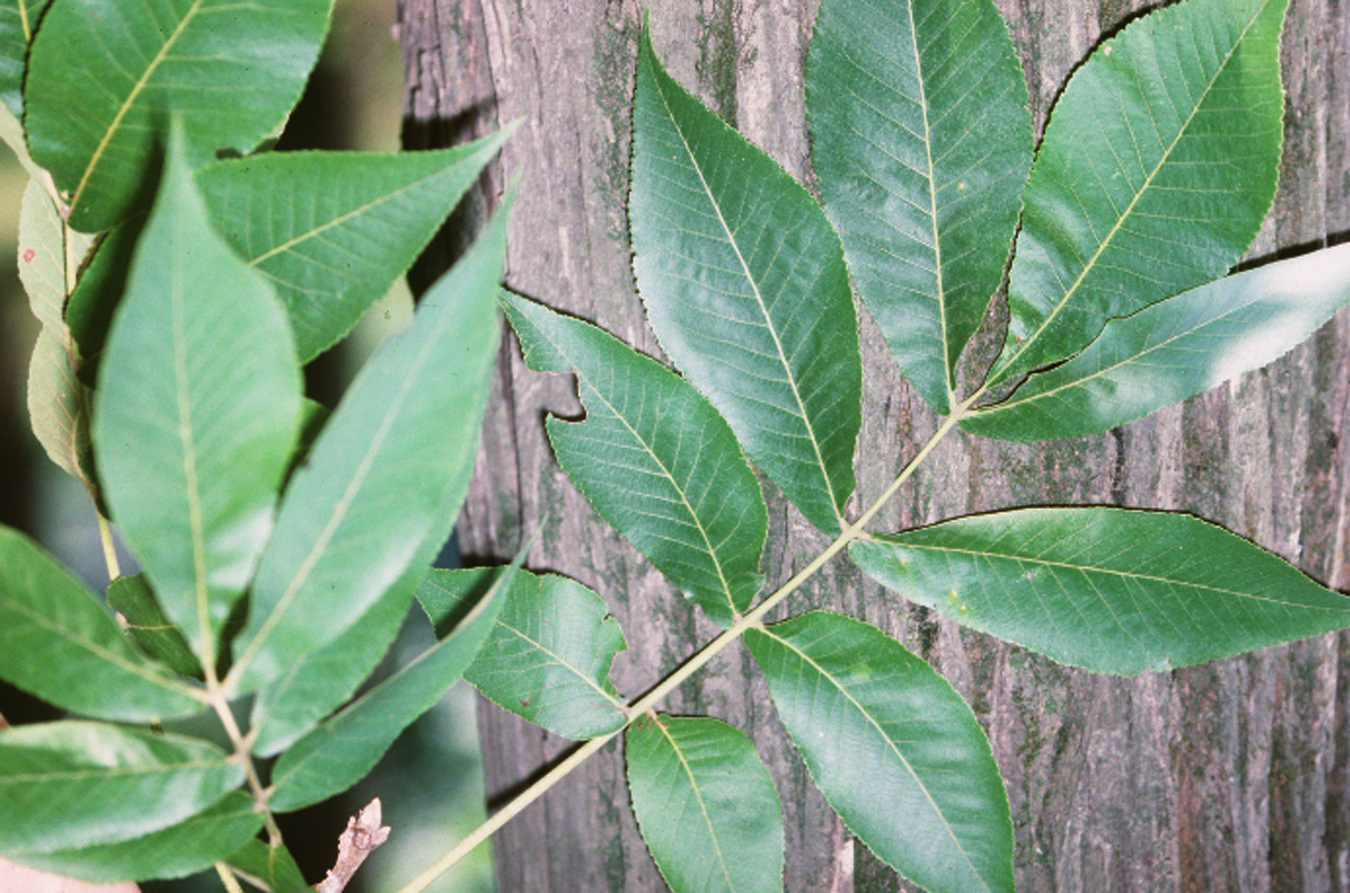
- Leaves and bark

Conservation status
- Least Concern (IUCN 3.1)

Scientific classification
- Kingdom: Plantae
- Clade: Embryophytes
- Clade: Tracheophytes
- Clade: Angiosperms
- Clade: Eudicots
- Clade: Rosids
- Order: Fagales
- Family: Juglandaceae
- Genus: Carya
- Section: Carya sect. Carya
- Species: C. laciniosa

Binomial name
- Carya laciniosa (Mill.) K.Koch
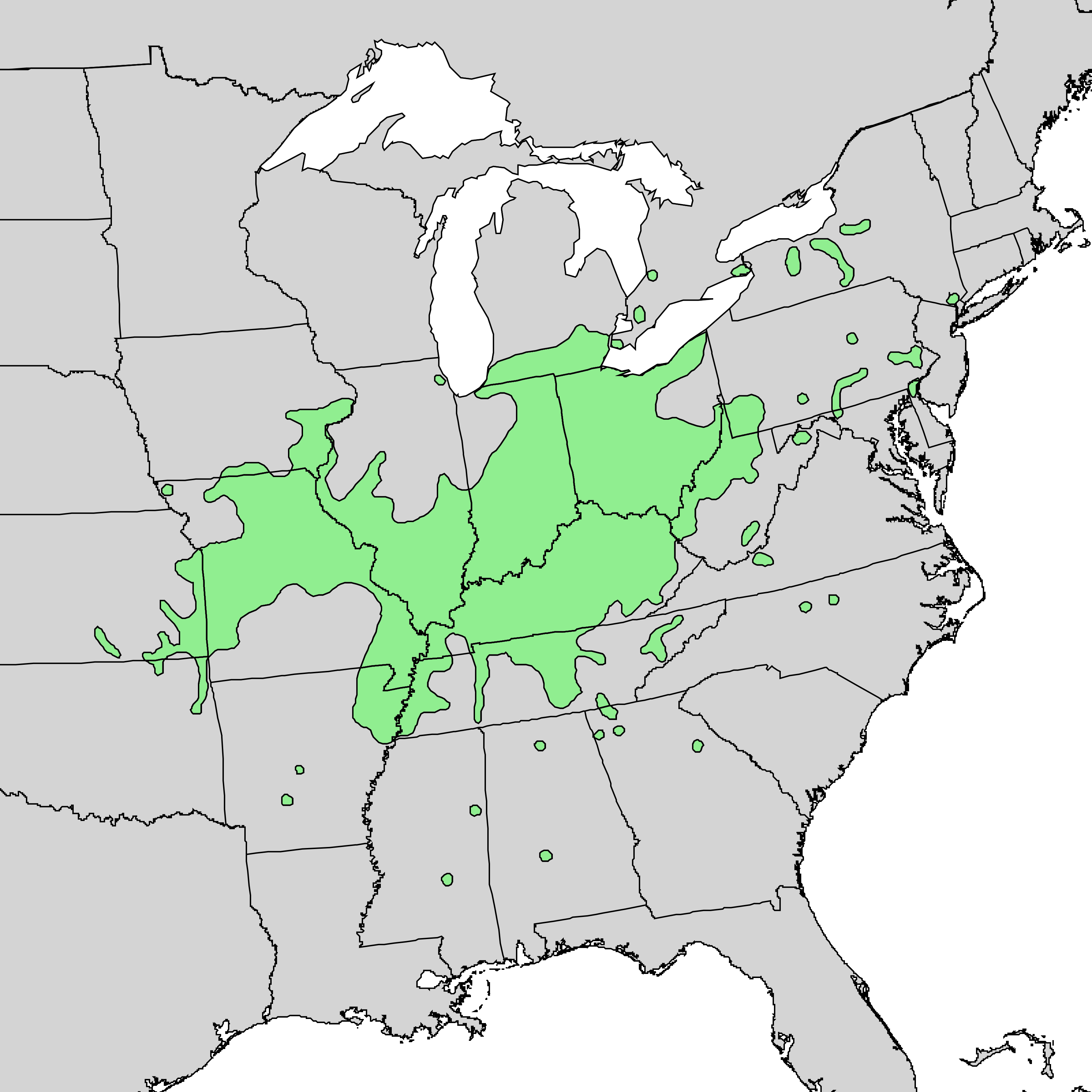
- Natural range

Synonyms
- Carya sulcata var. laciniosa (F.Michx.) K.Koch; Hicorius acuminata Dippel; Hicorius laciniosa (F.Michx.) Sarg.; Hicorius sulcata Raf.; Hicorius sulcata Britton; Juglans ambigua F.Michx.; Juglans laciniosa F.Michx.; Juglans pubescens Willd.; Juglans sulcata Willd.

= Carya laciniosa =

Shellbark hickory

Species of tree

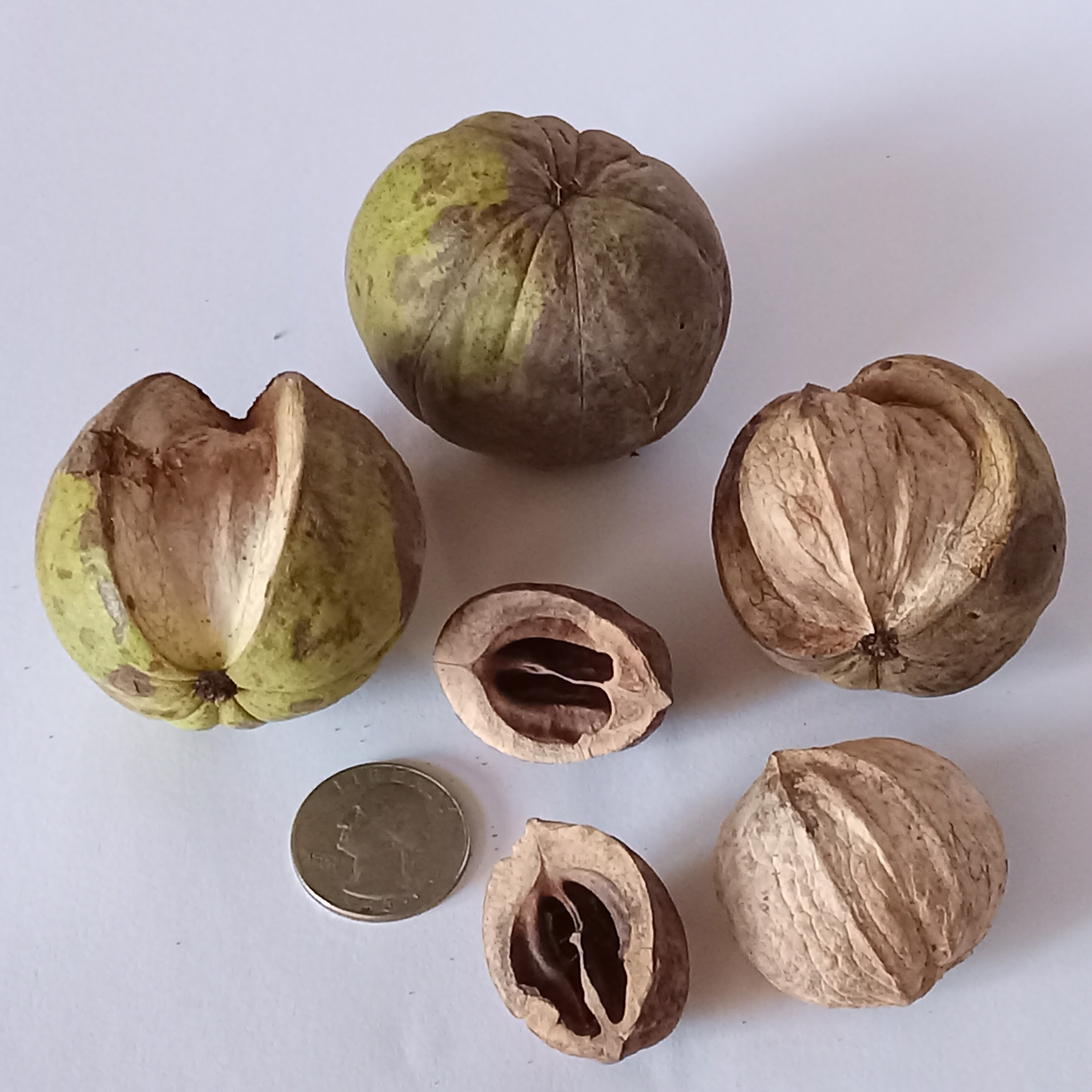
Fruit and Nuts

Carya laciniosa, the shellbark hickory, in the Juglandaceae or walnut family is also called kingnut, big, bottom, thick, or western shellbark, attesting to some of its characteristics. It is a slow-growing, long-lived tree, hard to transplant because of its long taproot, and subject to insect damage. The nuts, largest of all hickory nuts, are sweet and edible. Wildlife and people harvest most of them; those remaining produce seedling trees readily. The wood is hard, heavy, strong, and very flexible, making it a favored wood for tool handles. A specimen tree has been reported in Missouri with 117 cm (46 in) diameter at breast height, 36.9 m (121 ft 1 in) tall, and a spread of 22.6 m (74 ft 2 in).

== Description ==
=== Sapling and pole stages to maturity ===
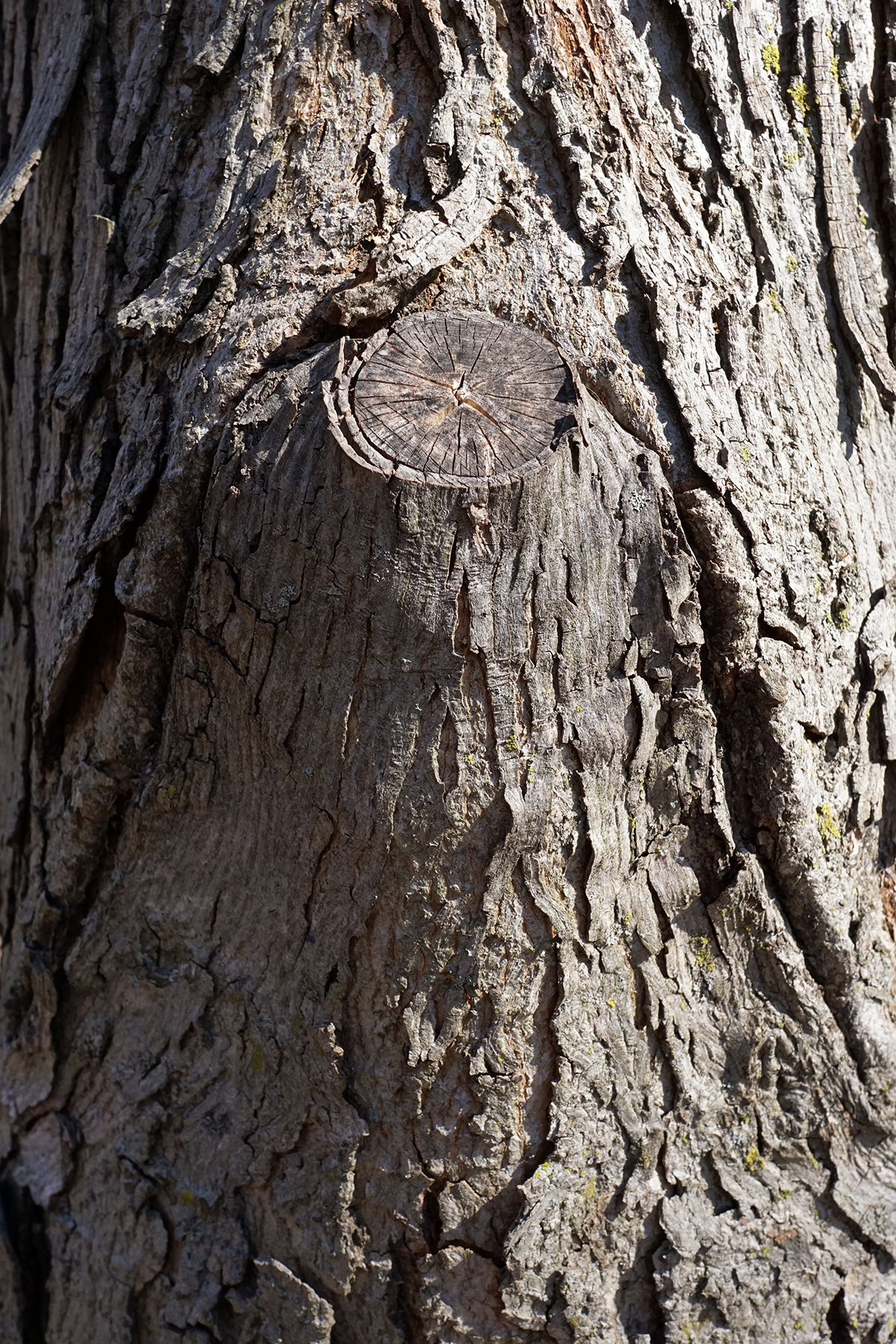
Bark

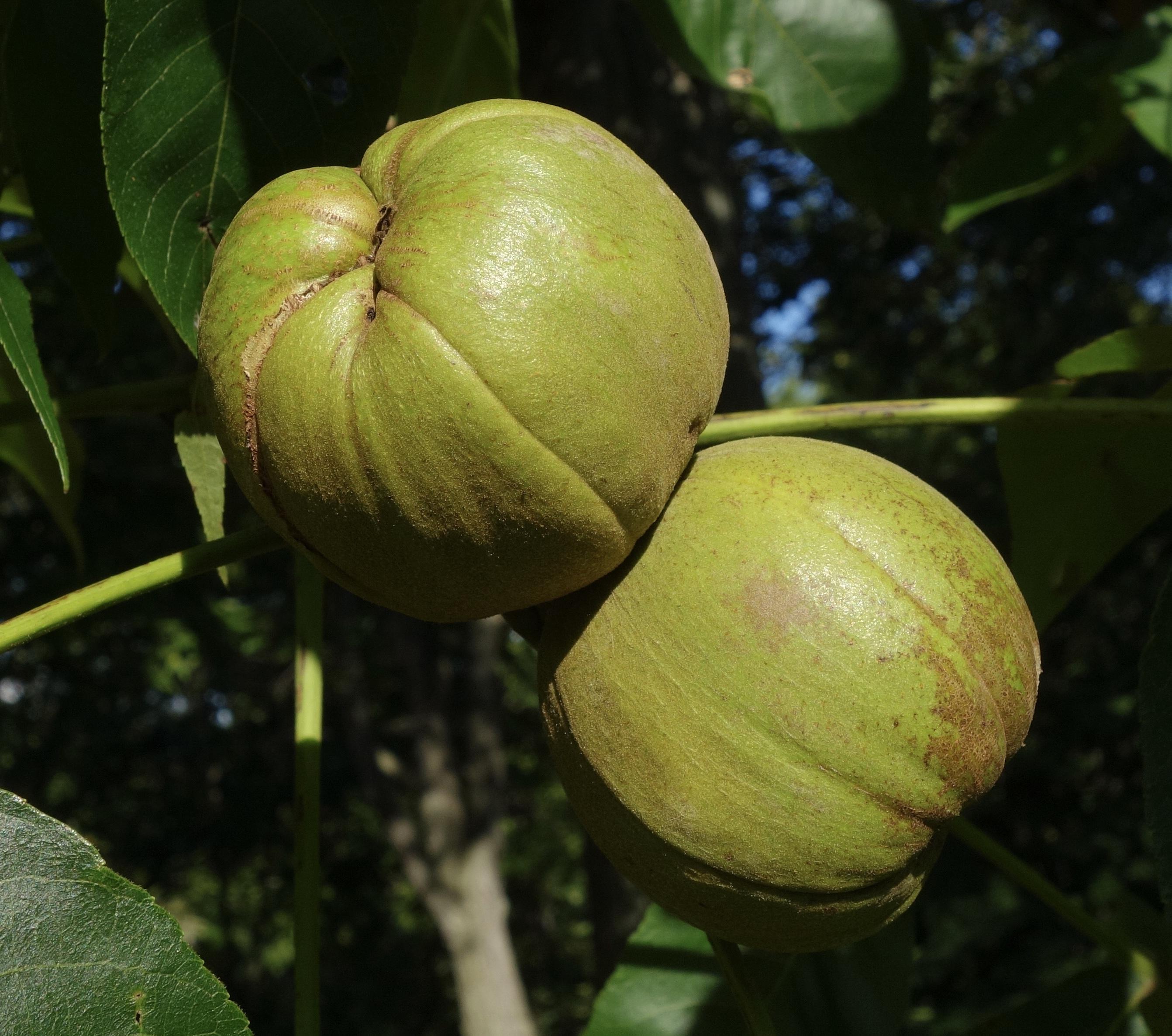
Maturing fruit

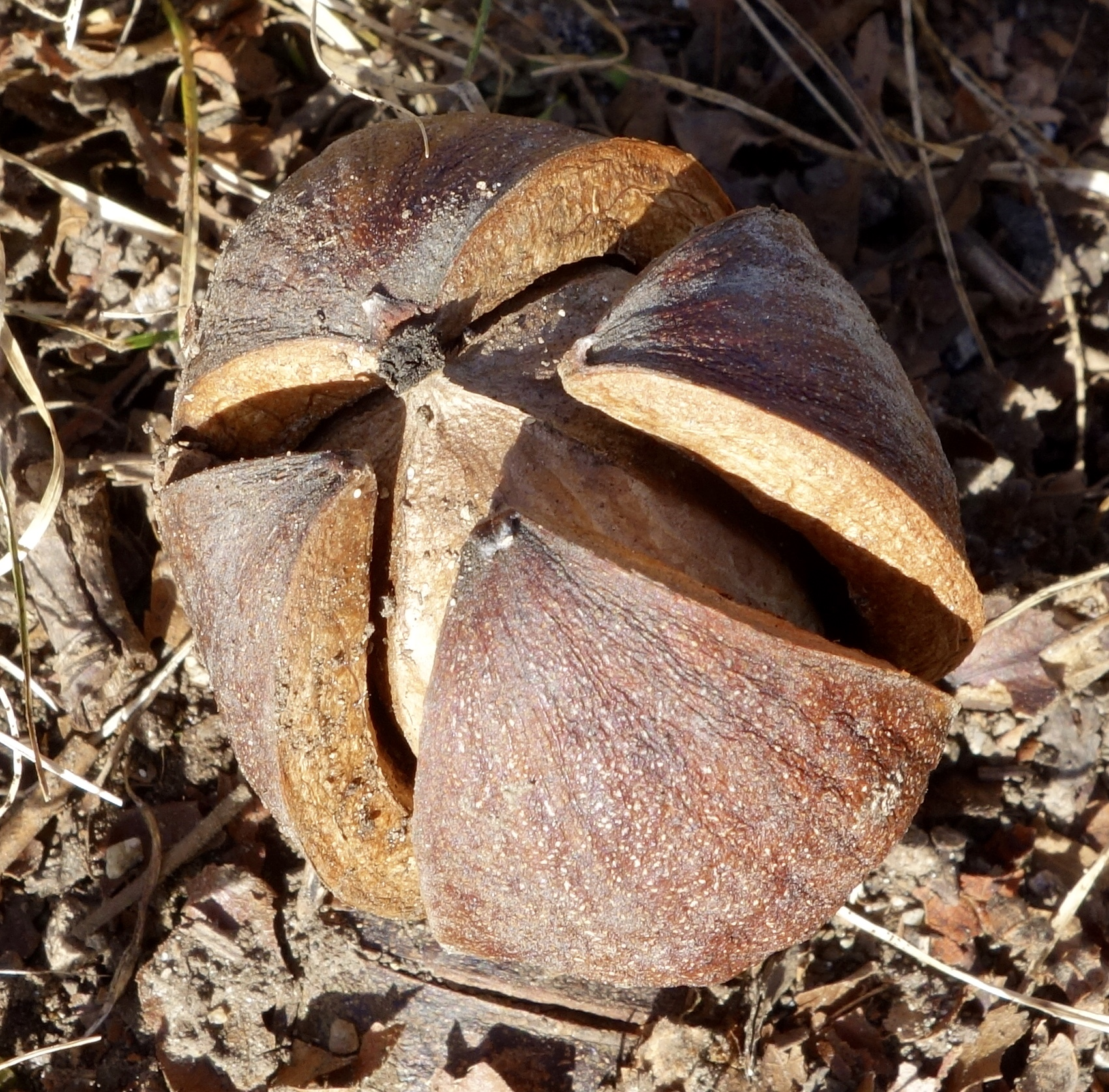
Mature fruit

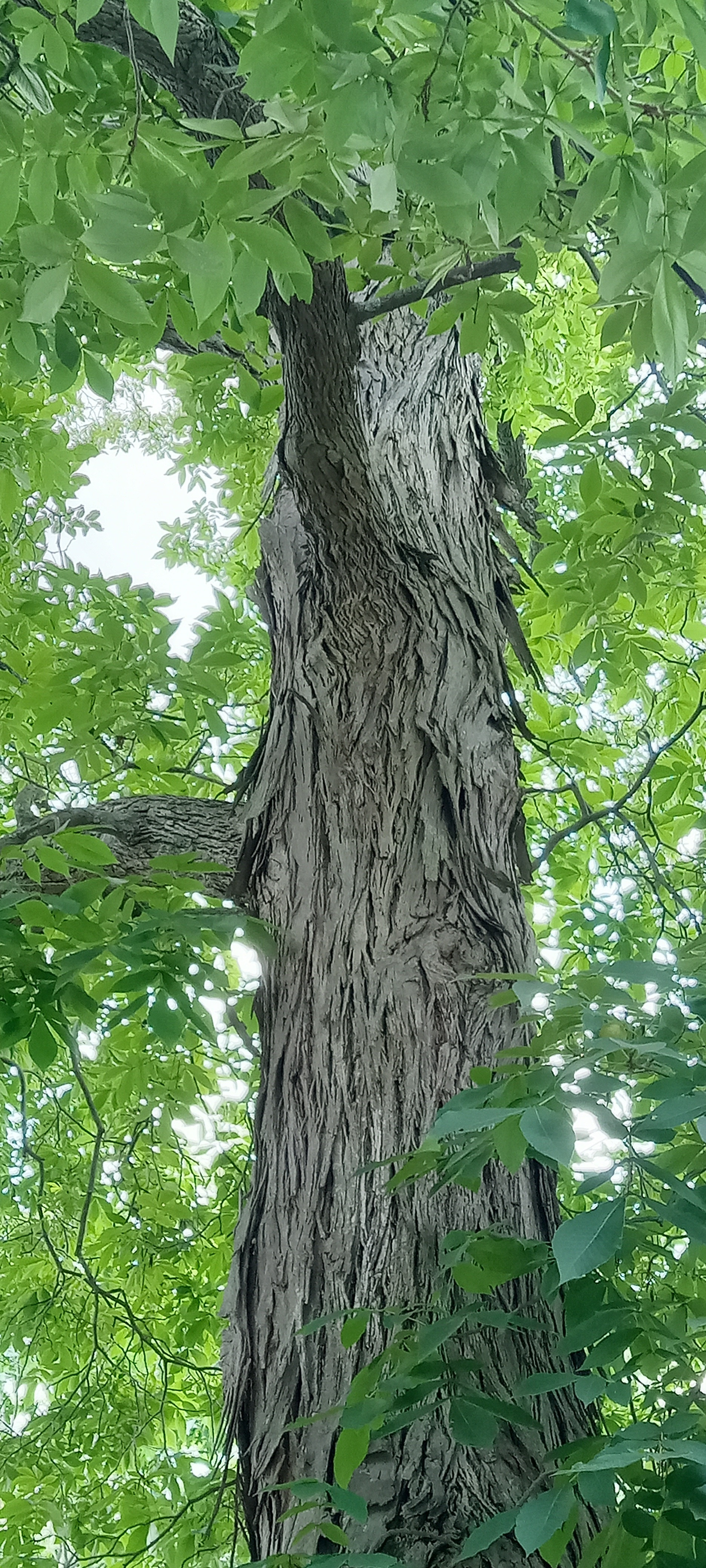
Mature trunk

Growth and yield: The hickories as a group grow slowly in diameter, and shellbark hickory is no exception. Sapling size trees average 2 mm (3/32 in) per year in diameter growth, increasing to 3 mm (1/8 in) per year as poles and sawtimber. Second-growth trees show growth rates of 5 mm (3/16 in) per year. Shellbark hickory occasionally grows to a height of 40 m (130 ft) and a diameter of 100 centimetres (39 in).

Rooting habit: Shellbark hickory develops a large taproot that penetrates deeply into the soil. Lateral roots emerge at nearly right angles to the taproot, spreading horizontally through the soil. Major distinct lateral roots usually develop 12 inches or more below ground level and appear only after taproot is well formed. In Illinois, root growth was rapid in April, slowed during July and August, increased again in September, and ended in late November.

Mycorrhizal associations are formed when trees are young. The only specific fungus identified from shellbark hickory roots is an ectotrophic mycorrhiza, Laccaria ochropurpurea.

Reaction to competition: Shellbark hickory is very shade-tolerant, exceeded only by sugar maple (Acer saccharum) and beech (Fagus grandifolia). It grows slowly under a dense canopy, however. In stands with only partial shade, it reproduces well. It is a very strong competitor in most of the species associations in which it is found.

Under forest conditions, shellbark hickory often develops a clear bole for half its length and has a narrow, oblong crown. Open-grown trees have egg-shaped crowns. Heavy release sometimes results in epicormic branching.

On mature trees, the bark peels away from the trunk in long, sometimes broad, strips. This gives the trees a "shaggy" appearance that is easily confused with that of the Shagbark hickory (Carya ovata). That close similarity is the reason Shellbark hickories are frequently misidentified. A closer examination of other traits is usually needed to distinguish the two species.

Damaging agents: Although numerous insects and diseases affect hickories, shellbark hickory has no enemies that seriously threaten its development or perpetuation as a species. Seed production can be reduced significantly, however, through attack by several insects. Two of the most important are the pecan weevil (Curculio caryae) and the hickory shuckworm (Laspeyresia caryana).

The hickory bark beetle (Scolytus quadrispinosus) feeds in the cambium and seriously weakens or even kills some trees. Adults of the hickory spiral borer (Agrilus arcuatus torquatus) feed on leaves, but the larvae feed beneath the bark and can be very destructive to hickory seedlings. The flatheaded appletree borer (Chrysobothris femorata) likewise is a foliage-feeder as an adult, but its larvae feed on the phloem and outer sapwood.

The living-hickory borer (Goes pulcher) feeds in the trunks and branches of trees. A twig girdler (Oncideres cingulata) can seriously affect reproduction by killing back the tops of seedlings and sprouts. Both standing dead trees and freshly cut logs are highly susceptible to attacks by numerous species of wood borers.

A large number of insect species feed on hickory foliage. None of them causes serious problems for shellbark hickory, although they may be responsible for some stem deformity and growth loss.

Shellbark hickory is free of serious diseases, but it is a host species for a variety of fungi. More than 130 fungi have been identified from species of Carya. These include leaf disease, stem canker, wood rot, and root rot-causing fungi. Specific information for shellbark hickory is not available.

Shellbark hickory is susceptible to bole injury from fire, and fire injuries are often invaded by wood rot fungi. It is resistant to snow and ice damage, but is susceptible to frost damage.

== Distribution and habitat ==
Shellbark hickory is widely distributed, but is common nowhere. The range extends from western New York through southern Michigan to southeast Iowa, south through eastern Kansas into northern Oklahoma, and eastward through Tennessee into Pennsylvania. This species is most prominent in the lower Ohio River region and south along the Mississippi River to central Arkansas. It is frequently found in the great river swamps of central Missouri and the Wabash River region in Indiana and Ohio. It's also found scattered in the Hudson valley in New York state.

In part due to the activities of humans, shellbark hickory has become rare in its natural range. The heavy seeds do not travel far from the parent tree and many stands have been lost to forest clearing and lumber harvesting. It is also not planted much as an ornamental due to its slow growth and difficulty of transplanting.

=== Climate ===
The mean length of the frost-free period within the range of shellbark hickory is from 150 to 210 days. The average January temperature is between −4 and 5 °C (25 and 41 °F), and for July the mean temperature is from 23 to 27 °C (73 to 81 °F). An average minimum temperature of −26 °C (−15 °F) occurs in the northern part of the range, and an average maximum temperature of 38 °C (100 °F) is found throughout the range. Precipitation varies between 750 and 1,500 mm (30 and 59 in) per year including 15 to 90 cm (5.9 to 35.4 in) of snow.

=== Soils and topography ===
Shellbark hickory grows best on deep, fertile, moist soils, most typical of the order Alfisols. It does not thrive in heavy clay soils, but grows well on heavy loams or silt loams. Shellbark hickory requires moister situations than do pignut, mockernut, or shagbark hickories (Carya glabra, C. alba, or C. ovata), although it is sometimes found on dry, sandy soils. Specific nutrient requirements are not known, but generally the hickories grow best on neutral or slightly alkaline soils.

The species is essentially a bottomland species and is often found on river terraces and second bottoms. Land subject to shallow inundations for a few weeks early in the growing season is favorable for shellbark. However, the tree will grow on a wide range of topographic and physiographic sites.

=== Associated forest cover ===
Shellbark hickory may be found in pure groups of several trees but is more frequent singly in association with other hardwoods. The species is a minor component of the forest cover types bur oak (Society of American Foresters type 42), pin oak–sweetgum (type 65), and swamp chestnut oak–cherrybark oak (type 91). It may also be found in one or more of the types in which hickories are included, but it is not identified at the species level.

Shellbark hickory commonly grows in association with American elm (Ulmus americana), slippery (U. rubra), and winged elms (U. alata), white (Fraxinus americana) and green ash (F. pennsylvanica), basswood (Tilia americana), American hornbeam (Carpinus caroliniana), red maple (Acer rubrum), blackgum (Nyssa sylvatica), sweetgum (Liquidambar styraciflua), and cottonwood (Populus deltoides). It is found in association with four other hickories–shagbark, mockernut, bitternut (Carya cordiformis), and water (C. aquatica), and numerous oak species, including swamp white (Quercus bicolor), pin (Q. palustris), white (Q. alba), Shumard (Q. shumardii), water (Q. nigra), Delta post (Q. stellata var. paludosa), swamp chestnut (Q. michauxii), and Nuttall (Q. nuttallii).

The herbaceous stratum includes numerous sedges and grasses. The shrub and small tree layer may be composed of painted buckeye (Aesculus sylvatica), pawpaw (Asimina triloba), flowering dogwood (Cornus florida), eastern redbud (Cercis canadensis), possumhaw (Ilex decidua), poison ivy (Toxicodendron radicans), and trumpet-creeper (Campsis radicans).

== Uses ==
The seeds within shellbark hickory nuts are edible and consumed by ducks, quail, wild turkeys, squirrels, chipmunks, deer, foxes, raccoons, and white-footed mice. A few plantations of shellbark hickory have been established for nut production, but the nuts are difficult to crack, though the kernel is sweet. The wood is used for furniture, tool handles, sporting goods, veneer, fuelwood, charcoal, and drum sticks.

== Genetics ==
Shellbark hickory hybridizes with the pecan, Carya illinoensis (C. x nussbaumeri Sarg.), and shagbark hickory, C. ovata (C. x dunbarii Sarg.). Shellbark hickory has 32 chromosomes. In general, species within the genus with the same chromosome number are able to cross. Numerous hybrids among the Carya species with 32 chromosomes (pecan, bitternut, shellbark, and shagbark) have been described.

== Gallery ==
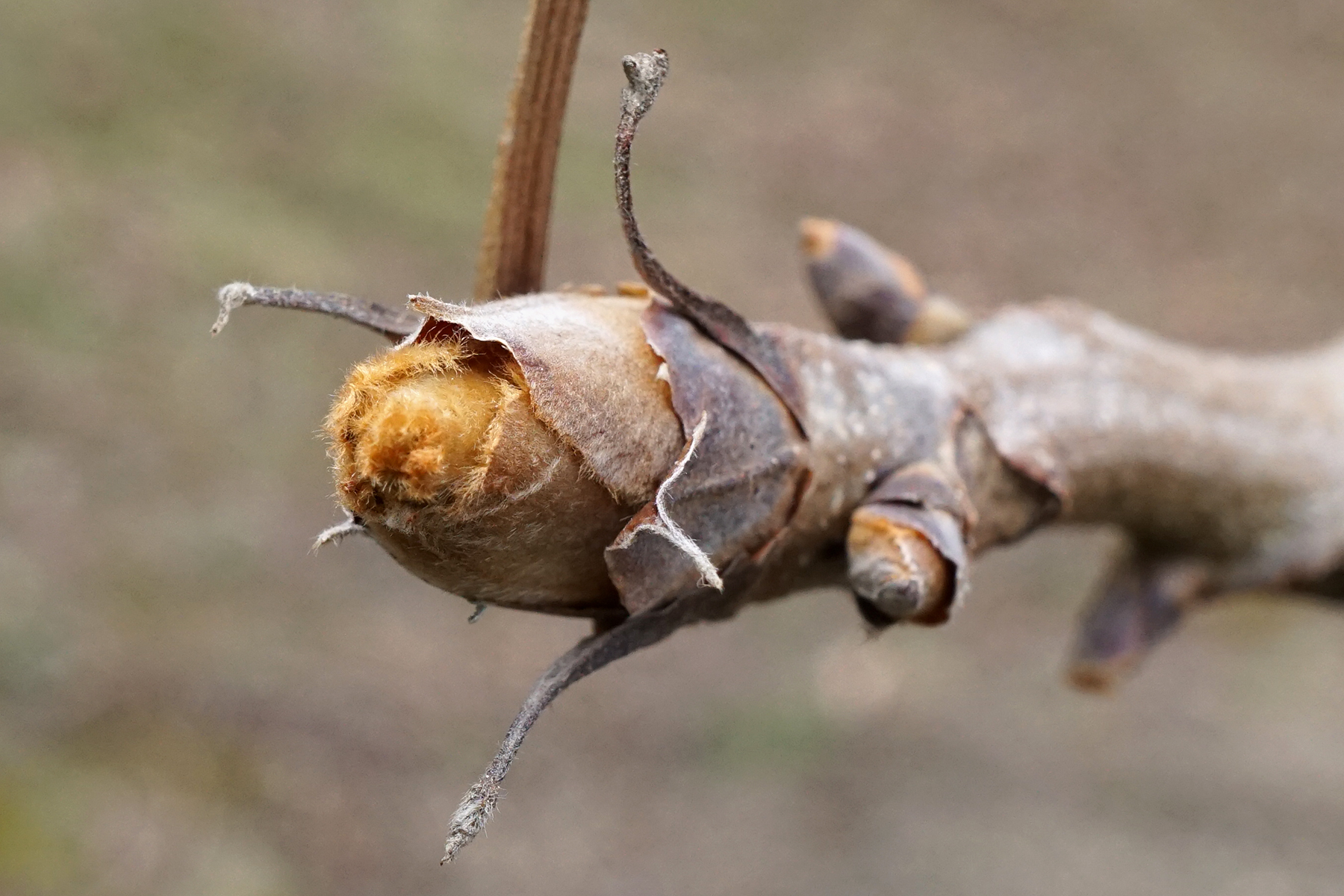
Bud

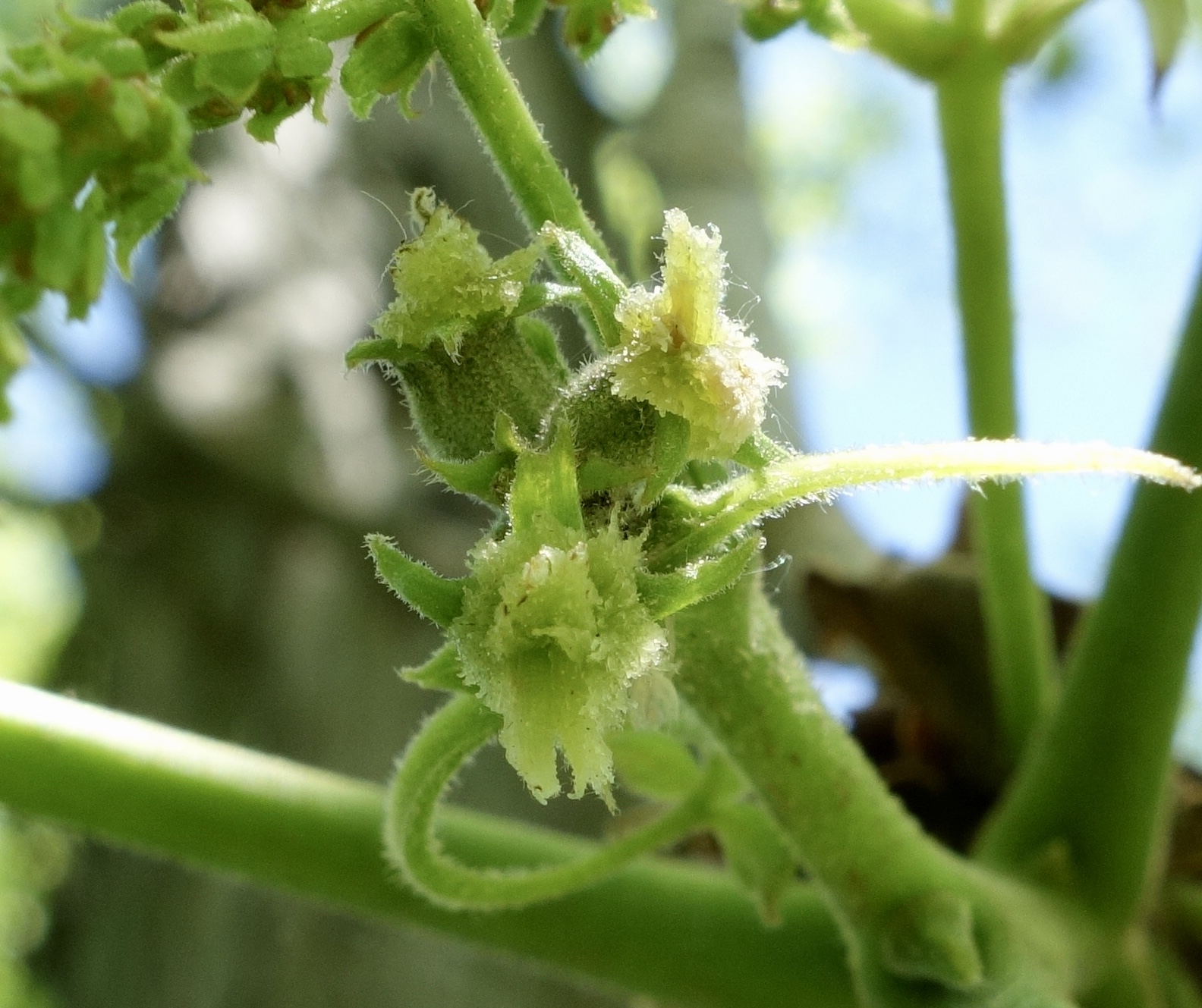
Female flowers

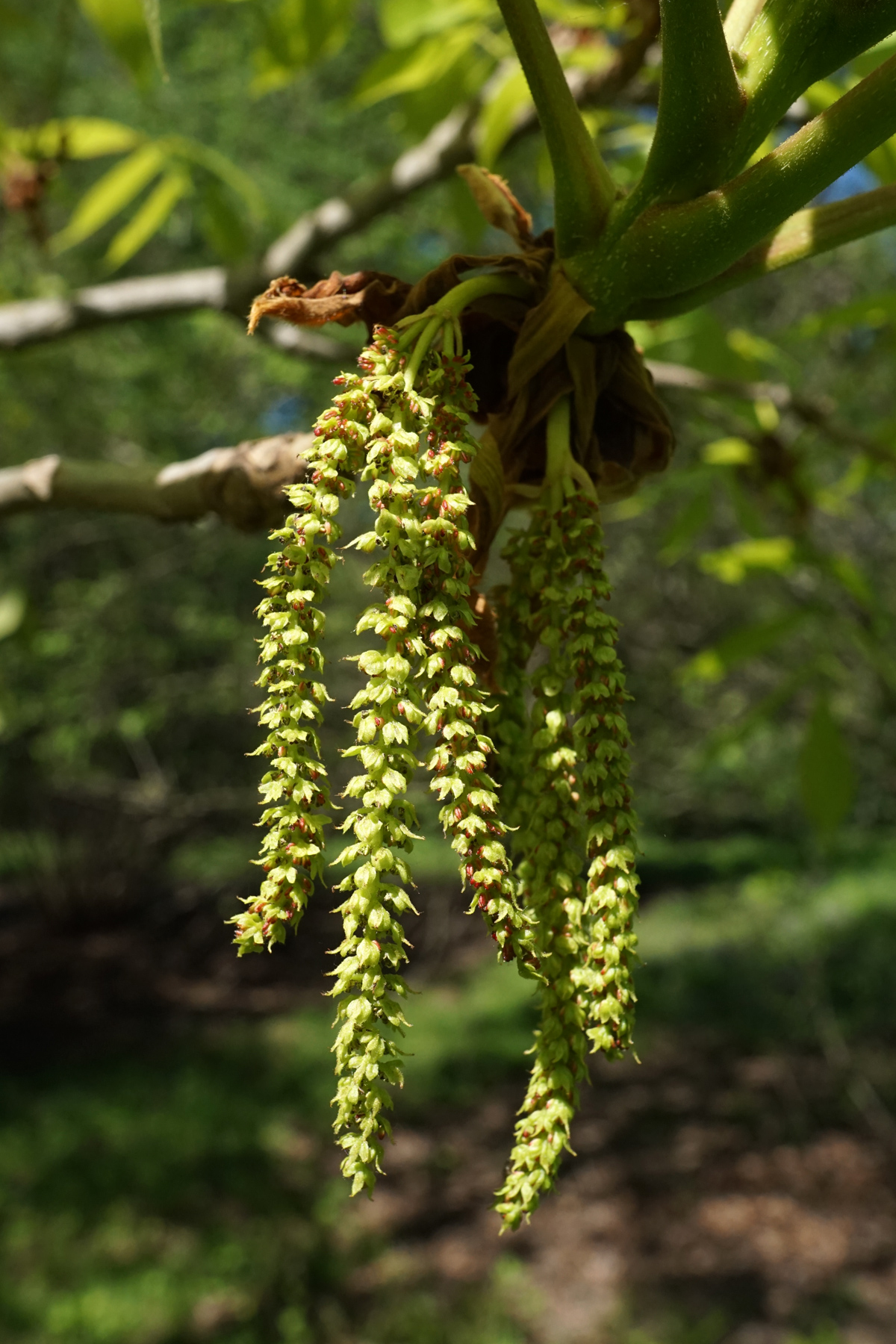
Catkins of male flowers

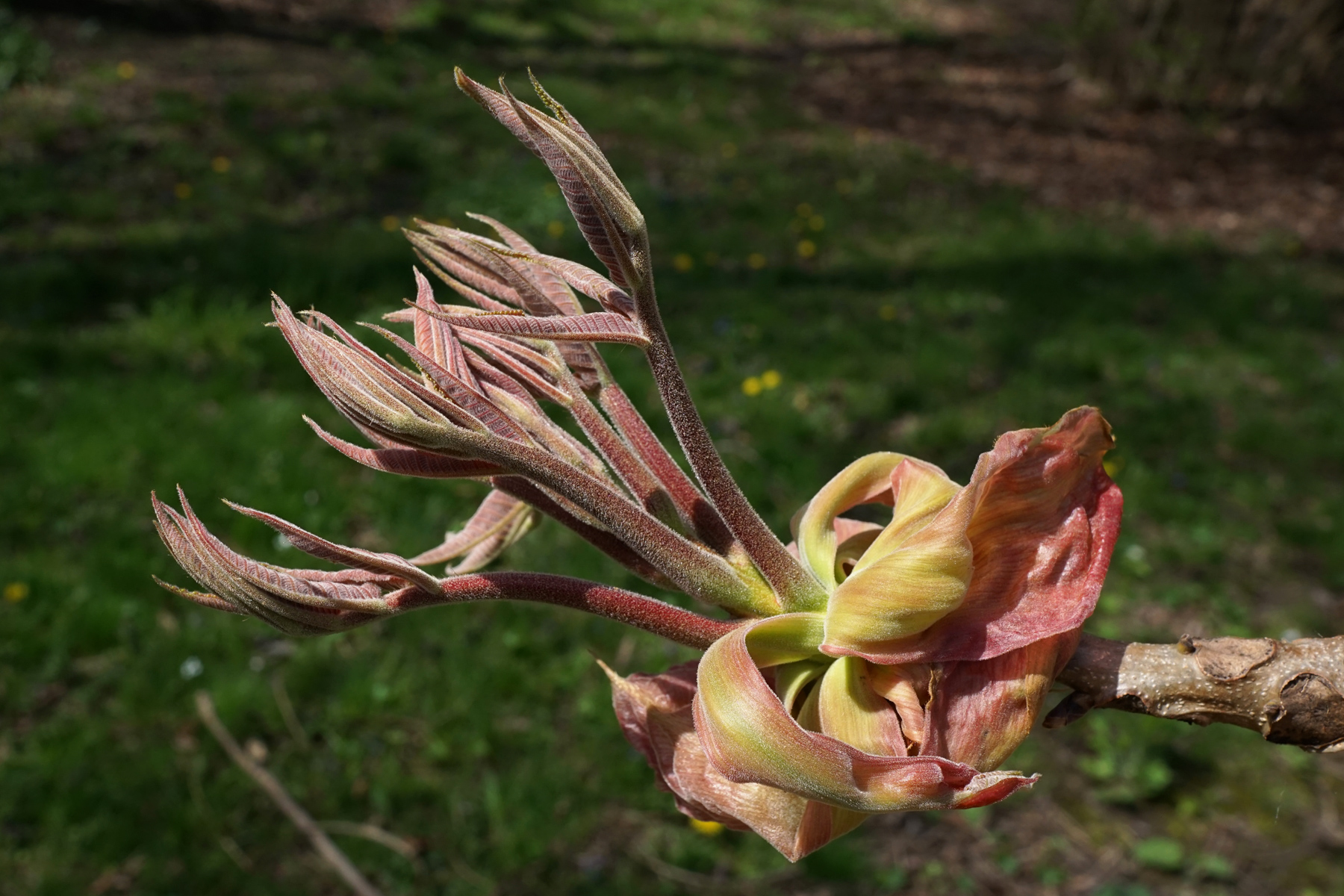
Bud break

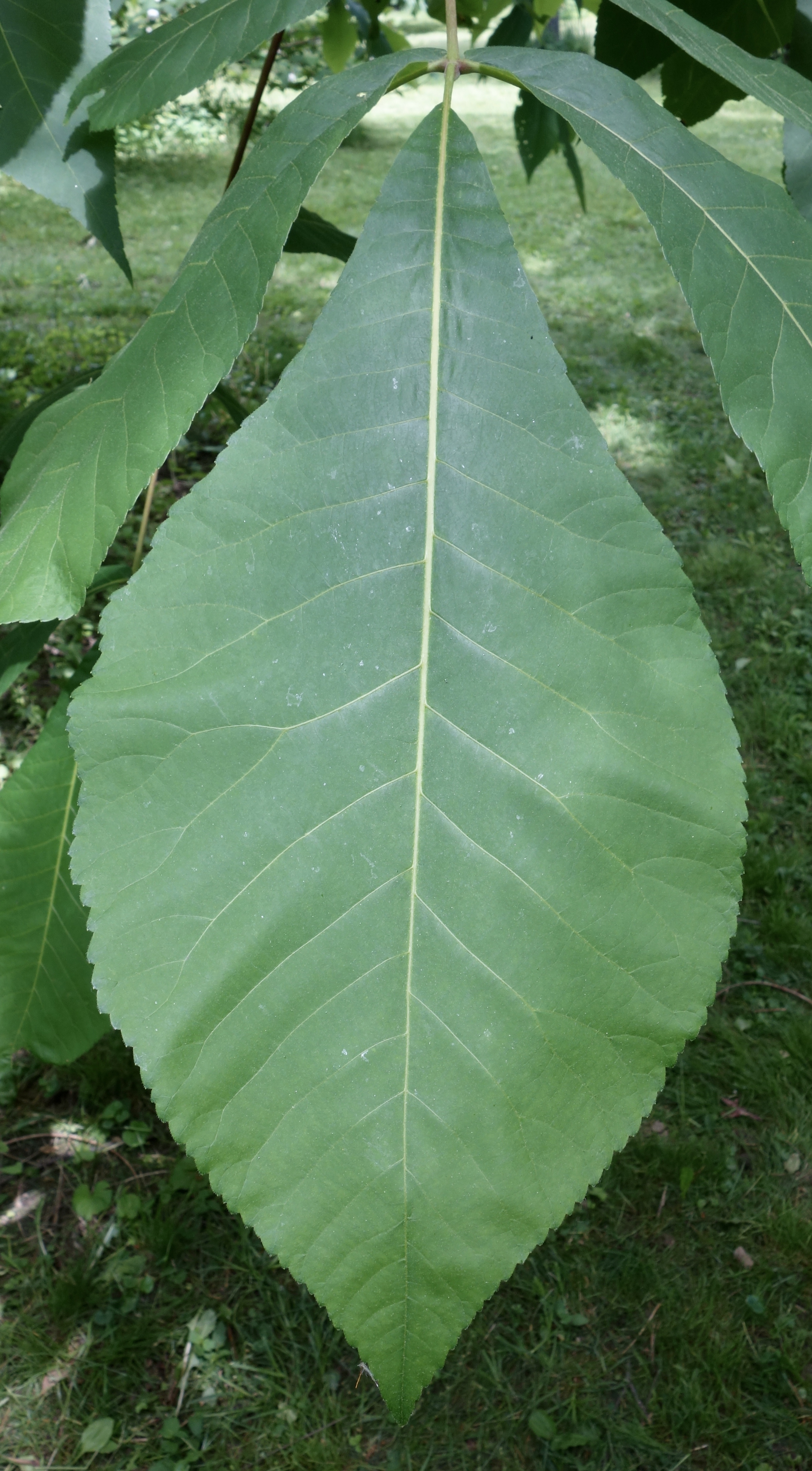
Terminal leaflet
