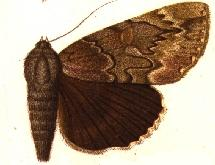

Scientific classification
- Kingdom: Animalia
- Phylum: Arthropoda
- Class: Insecta
- Order: Lepidoptera
- Superfamily: Noctuoidea
- Family: Erebidae
- Genus: Catocala
- Species: C. residua

Binomial name
- Catocala residua Grote, 1874

Synonyms
- Catabapta residua

= Catocala residua =

Species of moth

Catocala residua, the residua underwing, is a moth of the family Erebidae. The species was first described by Augustus Radcliffe Grote in 1874. It is found in North America from southern Ontario, Quebec and Maine south to North Carolina and Georgia west to Mississippi and Missouri and north to Iowa, Illinois and Michigan.

The wingspan is 60–73 mm. Adults are on wing from July to September depending on the location.

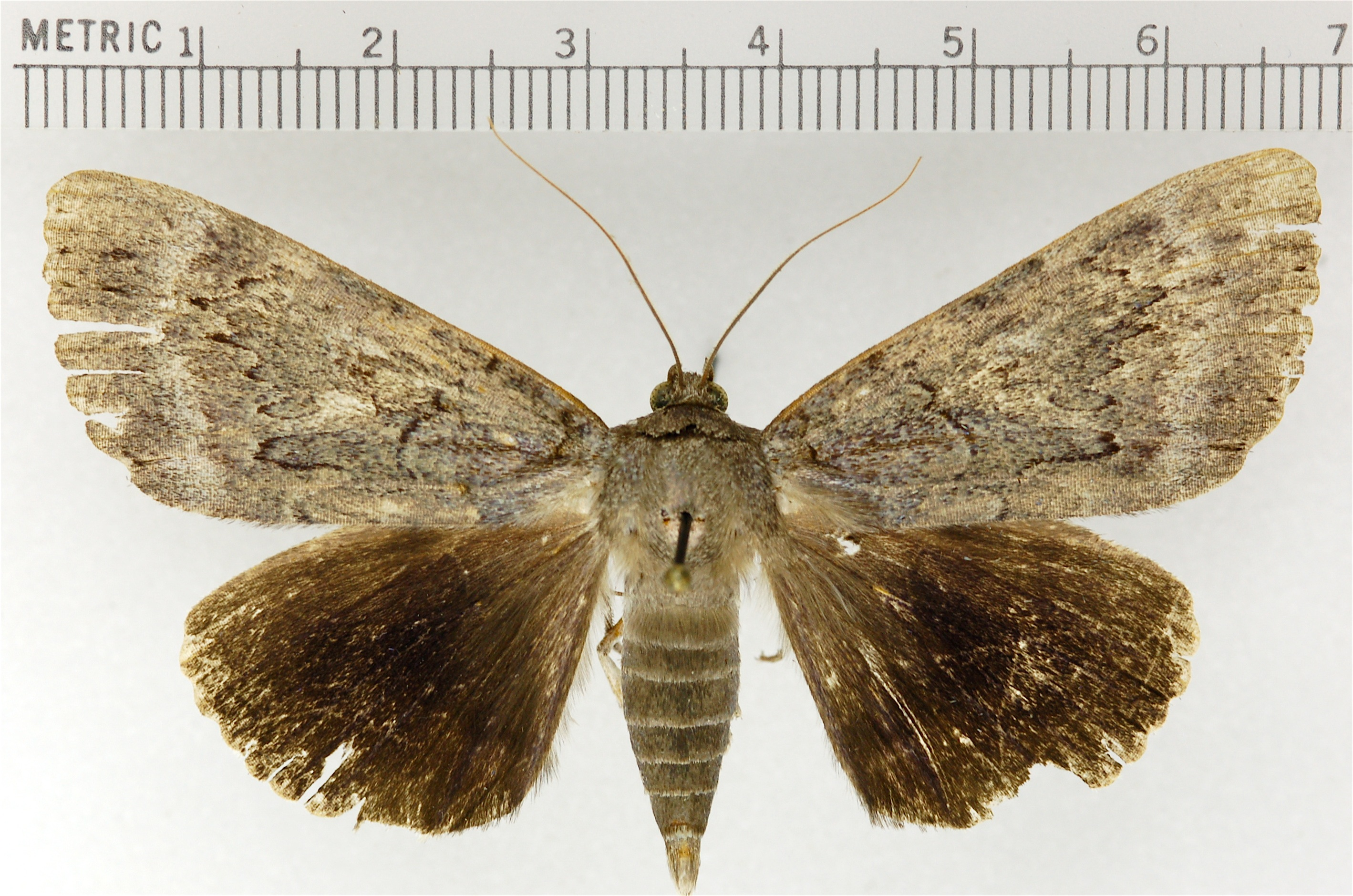

The larvae feed on the Carya species C. glabra, C. illinoinensis, C. laciniosa and C. ovata.
