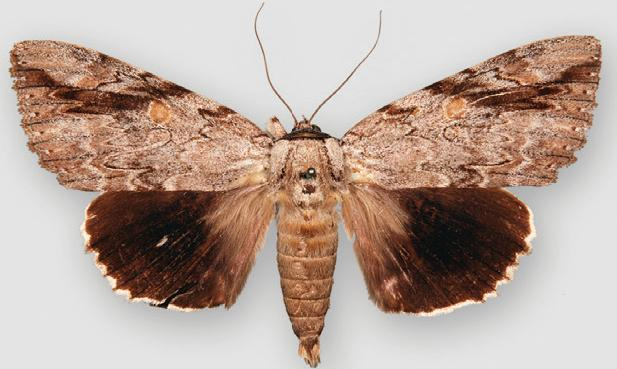

Scientific classification
- Kingdom: Animalia
- Phylum: Arthropoda
- Class: Insecta
- Order: Lepidoptera
- Superfamily: Noctuoidea
- Family: Erebidae
- Genus: Catocala
- Species: C. maestosa

Binomial name
- Catocala maestosa Hulst, 1884

Synonyms
- Catabapta viduata; Catocala viduata Guenée, 1852; Catocala guenei Grote, 1887; Catocala moderna Grote, 1900

= Catocala maestosa =

Sad underwing

Species of moth

Catocala maestosa, commonly known as the sad underwing, is a species of moth in the family Erebidae. The species was first described by George Duryea Hulst in 1884. It is found in the United States from New York south to Florida and Alabama, west to Texas and eastern Oklahoma and north to Illinois, Indiana and Minnesota.

The wingspan is 78–98 mm. Adults are on wing from July to October depending on the location. There is probably one generation per year.

The larvae feed on Carya aquatica, Carya illinoinensis and Juglans nigra.
