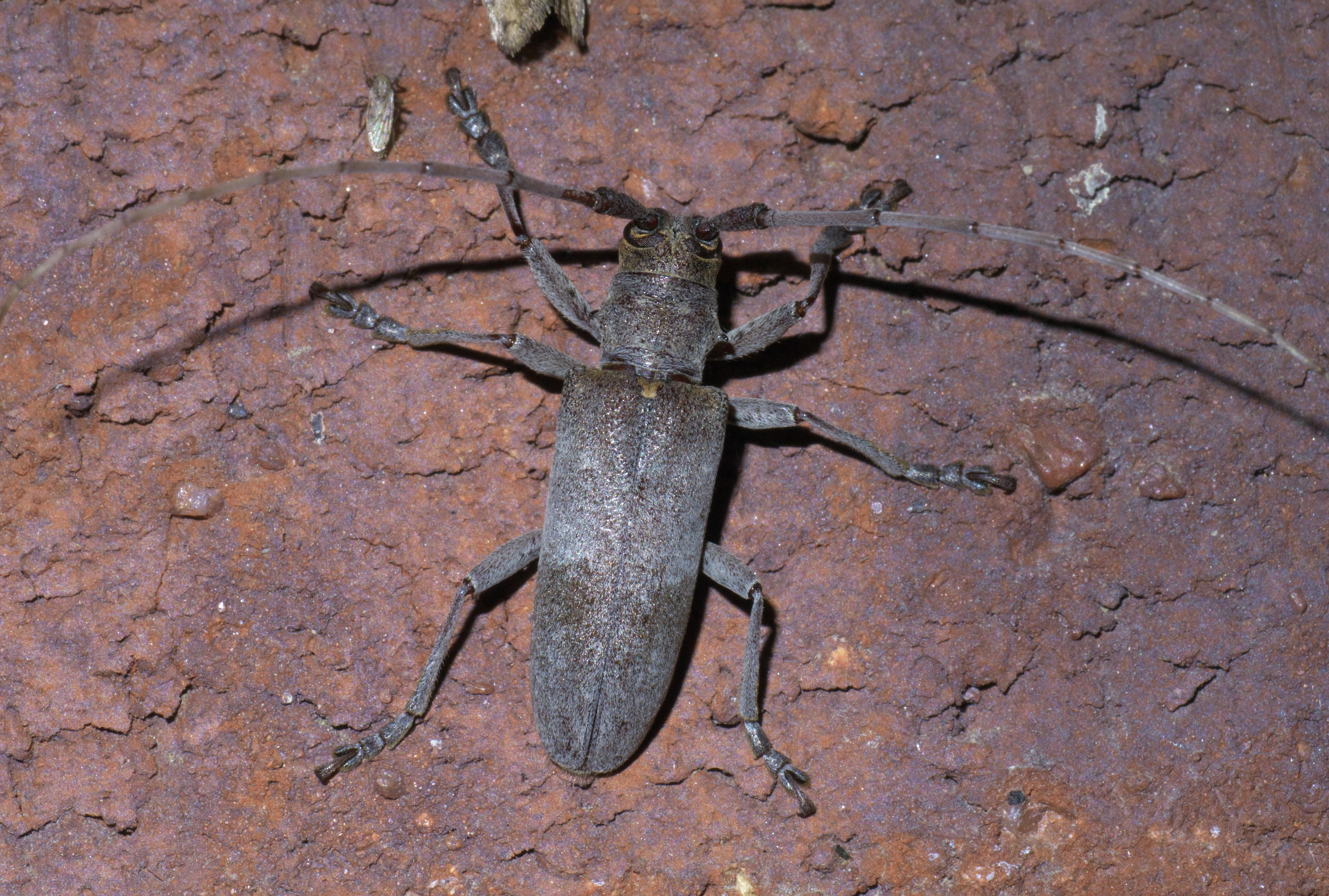

Scientific classification
- Domain: Eukaryota
- Kingdom: Animalia
- Phylum: Arthropoda
- Class: Insecta
- Order: Coleoptera
- Suborder: Polyphaga
- Infraorder: Cucujiformia
- Family: Cerambycidae
- Tribe: Lamiini
- Genus: Goes
- Species: G. pulverulentus

Binomial name
- Goes pulverulentus (Haldeman, 1847)

Synonyms
- Monohammus pulverulentus Haldeman, 1847

= Goes pulverulentus =

Species of beetle

Goes pulverulentus is a species of beetle in the family Cerambycidae. It was described by Haldeman in 1847, originally under the genus Monohammus. It is known from North America.
