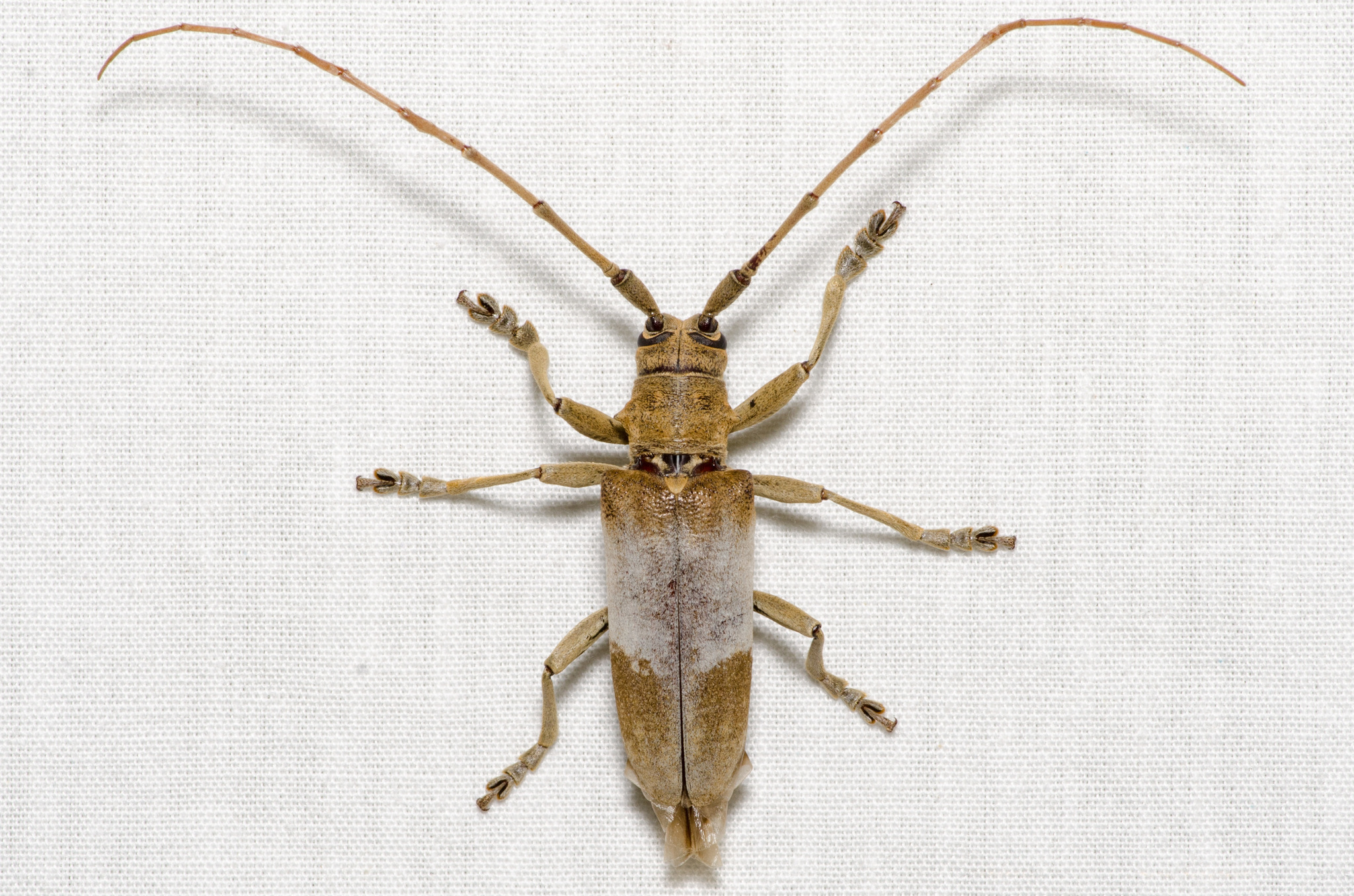

Scientific classification
- Domain: Eukaryota
- Kingdom: Animalia
- Phylum: Arthropoda
- Class: Insecta
- Order: Coleoptera
- Suborder: Polyphaga
- Infraorder: Cucujiformia
- Family: Cerambycidae
- Tribe: Lamiini
- Genus: Goes
- Species: G. fisheri

Binomial name
- Goes fisheri Dillon & Dillon, 1941

= Goes fisheri =

Species of beetle

Goes fisheri is a species of beetle in the family Cerambycidae. It was described by Dillon and Dillon in 1941. It is known from the United States.
