= Goes tumifrons =

Scientific classification
- Domain: Eukaryota
- Kingdom: Animalia
- Phylum: Arthropoda
- Class: Insecta
- Order: Coleoptera
- Suborder: Polyphaga
- Infraorder: Cucujiformia
- Family: Cerambycidae
- Tribe: Lamiini
- Genus: Goes
- Species: G. tumifrons

Binomial name
- Goes tumifrons Linsley & Chemsak, 1984

Species of beetle

Goes tumifrons is a species of beetle in the family Cerambycidae. It was described by Linsley and Chemsak in 1984. It is known from the United States.
