= Goes debilis =

Scientific classification
- Domain: Eukaryota
- Kingdom: Animalia
- Phylum: Arthropoda
- Class: Insecta
- Order: Coleoptera
- Suborder: Polyphaga
- Infraorder: Cucujiformia
- Family: Cerambycidae
- Tribe: Lamiini
- Genus: Goes
- Species: G. debilis

Binomial name
- Goes debilis LeConte, 1852

Species of beetle

Goes debilis is a species of beetle in the family Cerambycidae. It was described by John Lawrence LeConte in 1852. It is known from North America.
