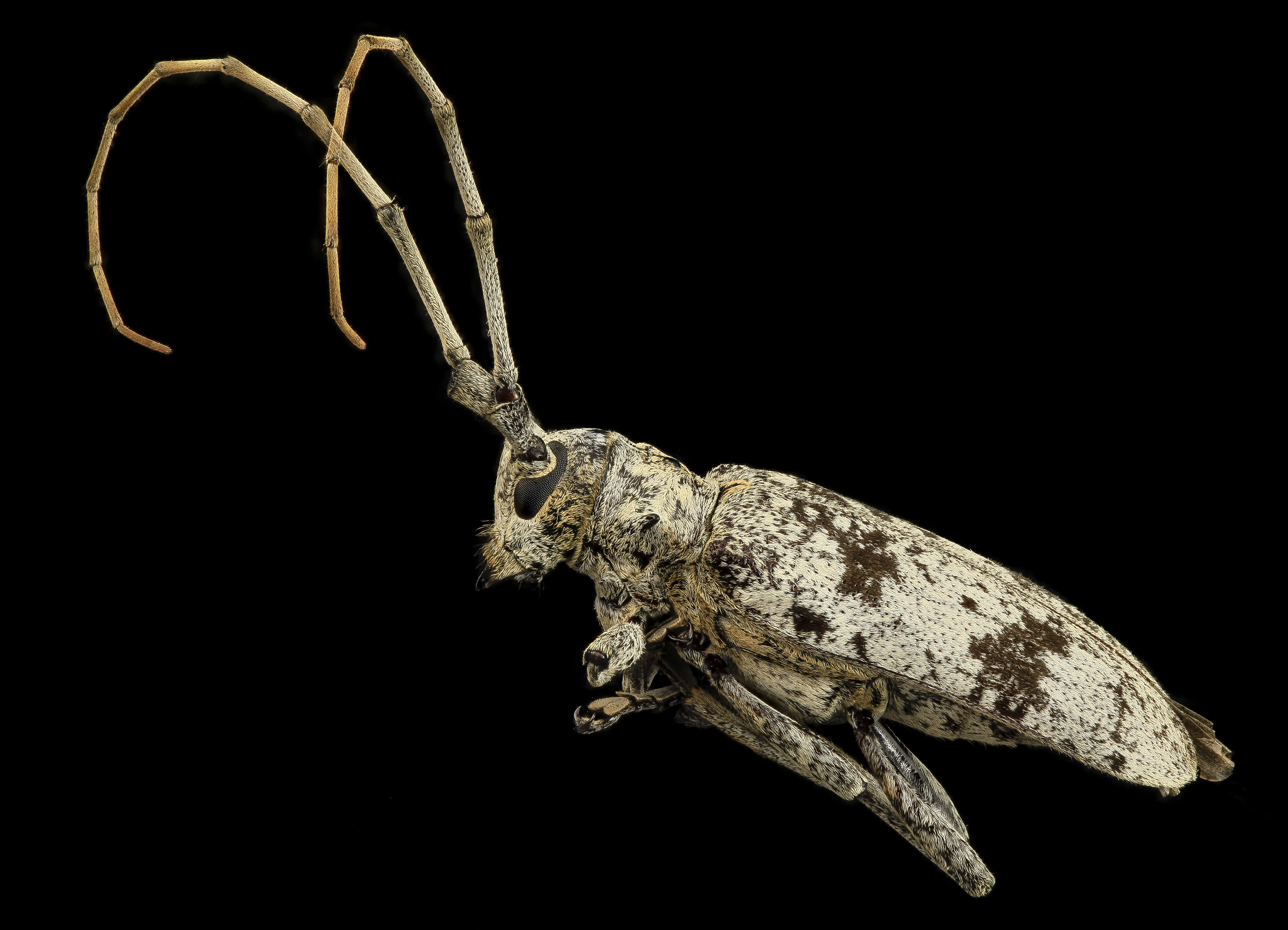

Scientific classification
- Domain: Eukaryota
- Kingdom: Animalia
- Phylum: Arthropoda
- Class: Insecta
- Order: Coleoptera
- Suborder: Polyphaga
- Infraorder: Cucujiformia
- Family: Cerambycidae
- Tribe: Lamiini
- Genus: Goes
- Species: G. tigrinus

Binomial name
- Goes tigrinus (DeGeer, 1775)

Synonyms
- Cerambyx tigrinus DeGeer, 1775

= Goes tigrinus =

Species of beetle

Goes tigrinus is a species of beetle in the family Cerambycidae. It was described by DeGeer in 1775, originally under the genus Cerambyx. It is known from the United States.
