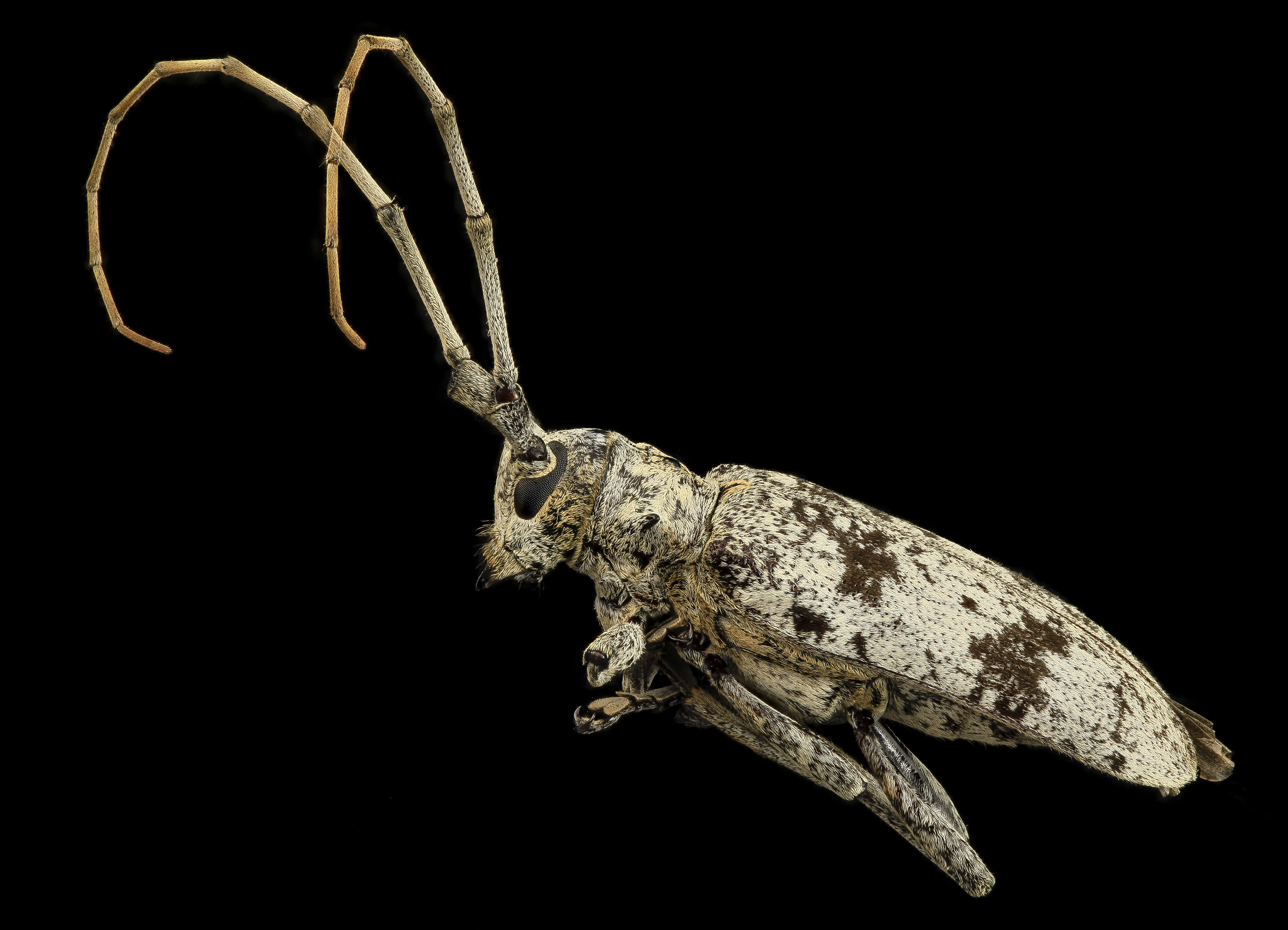
- White oak borer (Goes tigrinus)

Scientific classification
- Domain: Eukaryota
- Kingdom: Animalia
- Phylum: Arthropoda
- Class: Insecta
- Order: Coleoptera
- Suborder: Polyphaga
- Infraorder: Cucujiformia
- Family: Cerambycidae
- Subfamily: Lamiinae
- Tribe: Lamiini
- Genus: Goes; LeConte, 1852

= Goes (beetle) =

Genus of beetles

Goes is a genus of longhorn beetles, containing the following species:

- Goes debilis LeConte, 1852
- Goes fisheri Dillon & Dillon, 1941
- Goes novus Fall, 1928
- Goes pulcher (Haldeman, 1847)
- Goes pulverulentus (Haldeman, 1847)
- Goes tesselatus (Haldeman, 1847)
- Goes tigrinus (DeGeer, 1775)
- Goes tumifrons Linsley & Chemsak, 1984
- Goes variegatus Linsley & Chemsak, 1984
