= Goes tesselatus =

Scientific classification
- Domain: Eukaryota
- Kingdom: Animalia
- Phylum: Arthropoda
- Class: Insecta
- Order: Coleoptera
- Suborder: Polyphaga
- Infraorder: Cucujiformia
- Family: Cerambycidae
- Tribe: Lamiini
- Genus: Goes
- Species: G. tesselatus

Binomial name
- Goes tesselatus (Haldeman, 1847)

Synonyms
- Goes robinsoni Casey, 1914; Hammoderus amplipennis Casey, 1913; Monohammus tesselatus Haldeman, 1847

Species of beetle

Goes tesselatus is a species of beetle in the family Cerambycidae. It was described by Haldeman in 1847, originally under the genus Monohammus. It is known from the United States.
