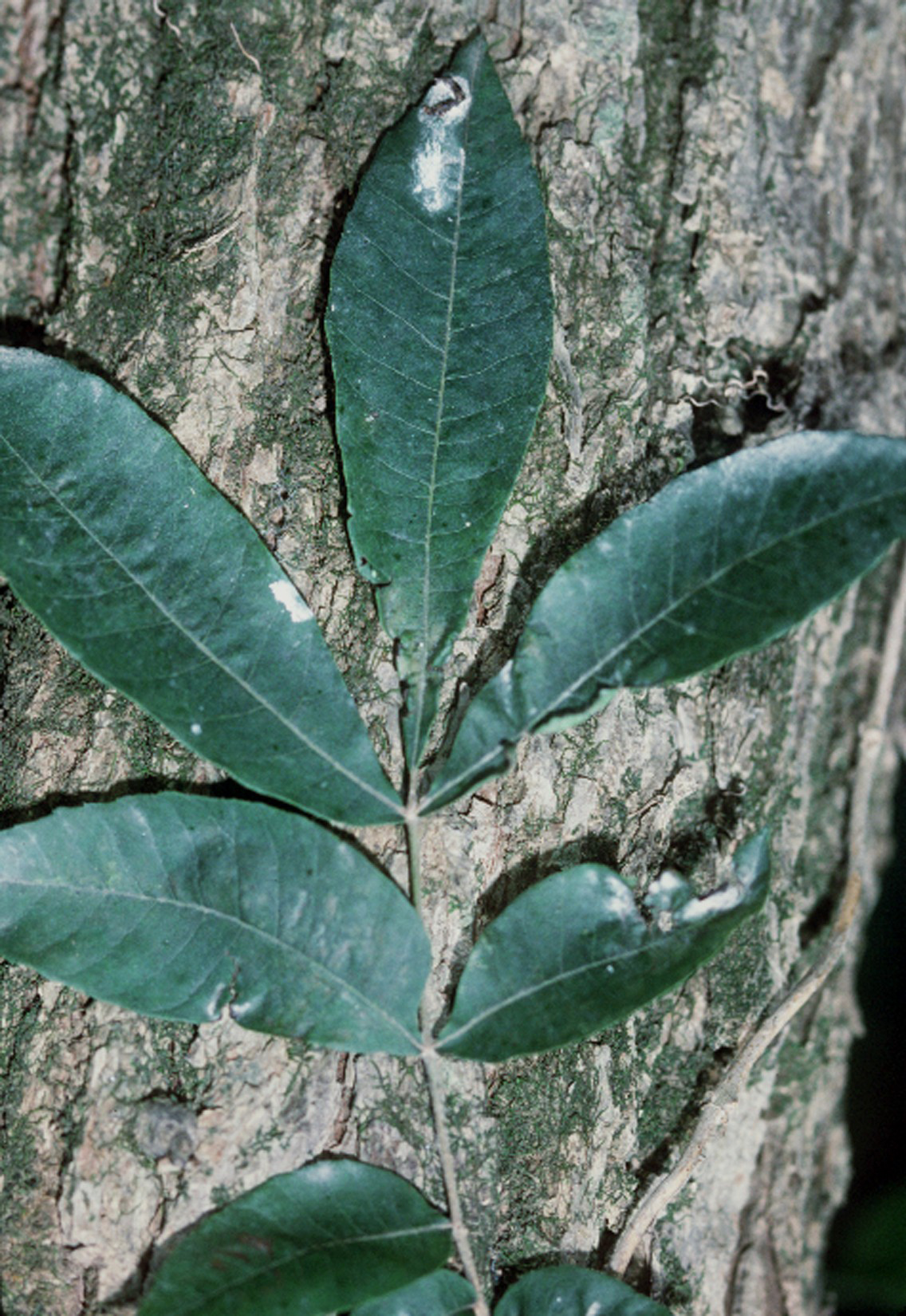

Conservation status
- Least Concern (IUCN 3.1)

Scientific classification
- Kingdom: Plantae
- Clade: Embryophytes
- Clade: Tracheophytes
- Clade: Angiosperms
- Clade: Eudicots
- Clade: Rosids
- Order: Fagales
- Family: Juglandaceae
- Genus: Carya
- Section: Carya sect. Apocarya
- Species: C. aquatica

Binomial name
- Carya aquatica (F.Michx.) Nutt. ex Elliott
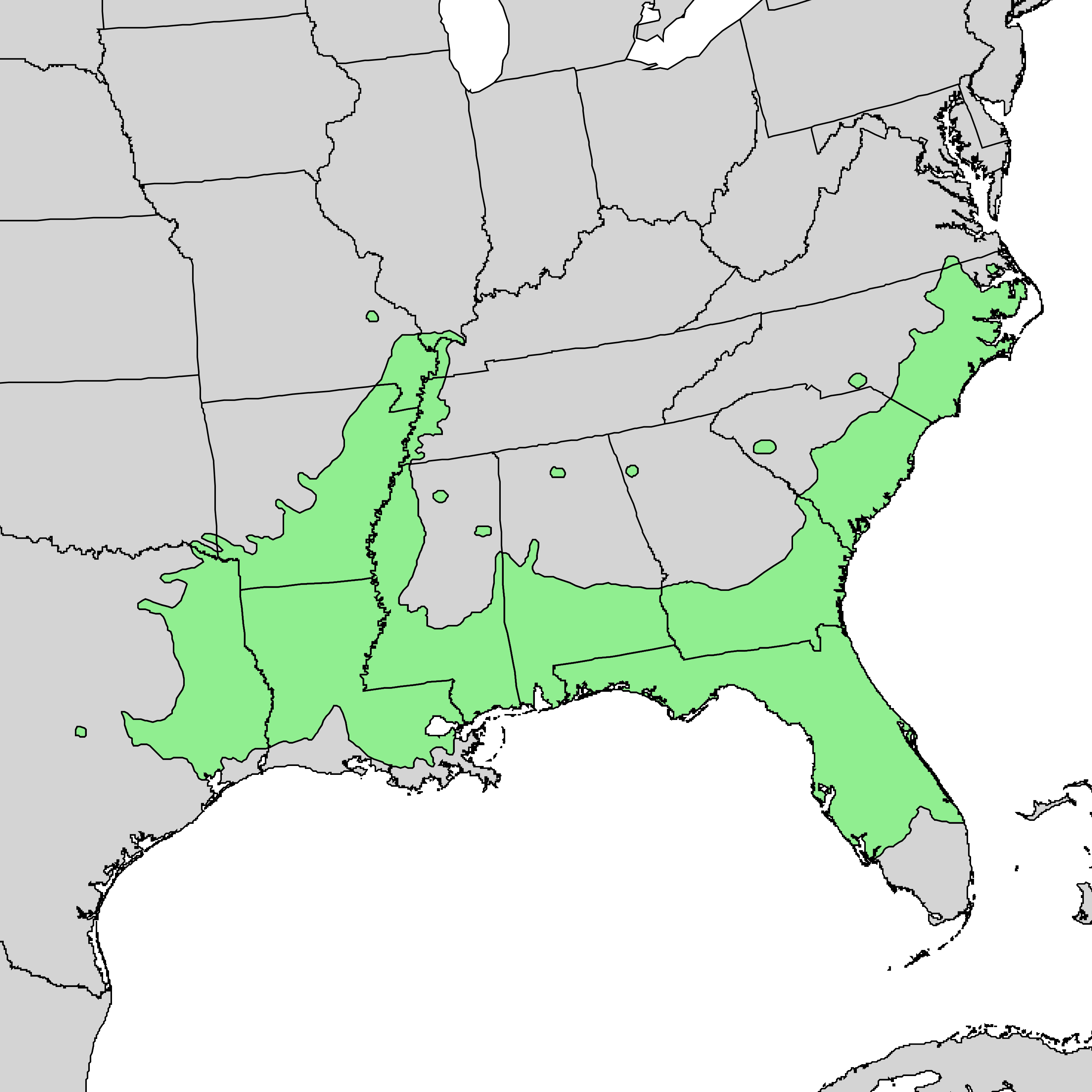
- Natural range of Carya aquatica

Synonyms
- Carya aquatica var. australis Sarg.; Hicorius aquatica (F.Michx.) Britton; Hicorius aquatica var. australis Sudw.; Juglans aquatica F.Michx.

= Carya aquatica =

Water hickory

Species of tree

Carya aquatica, the bitter pecan or water hickory, is a large tree of the Juglandaceae or walnut family. In the Southeastern United States it is a dominant plant species found on clay flats and backwater areas near streams and rivers. The species reproduces aggressively both by seed and sprouts from roots and from stumps of cut trees. Water hickory is a major component of wetland forests now in the southeastern US, because of the selective cutting of more desirable tree species for the lumber industry. It can grow over 30 metres (98 ft) tall. It is considered important in cleansing drainage waters since the plants slow water flow during flooding, allowing sediments to fall out of the water column. This tree species is tolerant of wet soils but grows best on well draining soils near rivers and other waterways.

== Habitat ==
=== Native range ===
Water hickory inhabits the Atlantic and Gulf Coastal Plains from southeastern Virginia to southern Florida, Alabama, west into eastern Texas, and the Mississippi Valley north to southern Illinois.

=== Soils and topography ===
Water hickory attains its best growth on moist but well-drained loamy or silty soils in the Mississippi River Valley and along some Coastal Plain streams. However, because of its slow growth rate and past logging and land management practices, it is rare on these sites except where it has been favored by repeated "high-grade" logging. Water hickory is now most often found on wet sites where only a few other species of trees grow, it is somewhat intolerant of competition being shade intolerant. It is common on clay flats, sloughs, and backwater areas, but seldom in coastal swamps or sites where soils are continually saturated. The species is most common on soils in the Vertic Haplaquepts subgroup of the order Inceptisols. Water hickory sites are subject to inundation during heavy rains and stream overflow, during droughts these sites dry out and develop cracking of the soil during occasional dry summers.

=== Associated forest cover ===
Water hickory is a major component of two forest cover types: Sugarberry-American elm-Green Ash (Society of American Foresters Type 93) and Overcup Oak-Water Hickory (Type 96). It is a minor component in Sweetgurn-Willow Oak (Type 92) and is sometimes found on the edge of Baldcypress (Type 101) and Baldcypress-Tupelo (Type 102).

Important associated tree species are Quercus lyrata - Overcup oak, Quercus nuttallii - Nuttall oak, and Quercus phellos - Willow oaks; Ulmus crassifolia - Ceder elm and Ulmus americana - American elm; waterlocust and honeylocust (Gleditsia aquatica and G. triacanthos); pecan; green ash (Fraxinus pennsylvanica); sugarberry (Celtis laevigata); persimmon (Diospyros virginiana); red maple (Acer rubrum); and baldcypress (Taxodium distichum).

The most frequent noncommercial trees and shrubs associated with water hickory are hawthorn (Crataegus spp.), swamp-privet (Forestiera acummata), roughleaf dogwood (Cornus drummondii), buttonbush (Cephalanthus occidentalis), possumhaw (Ilex decidua), and water-elm (Planera aquatica).

== Life history ==
=== Reproduction and early growth ===
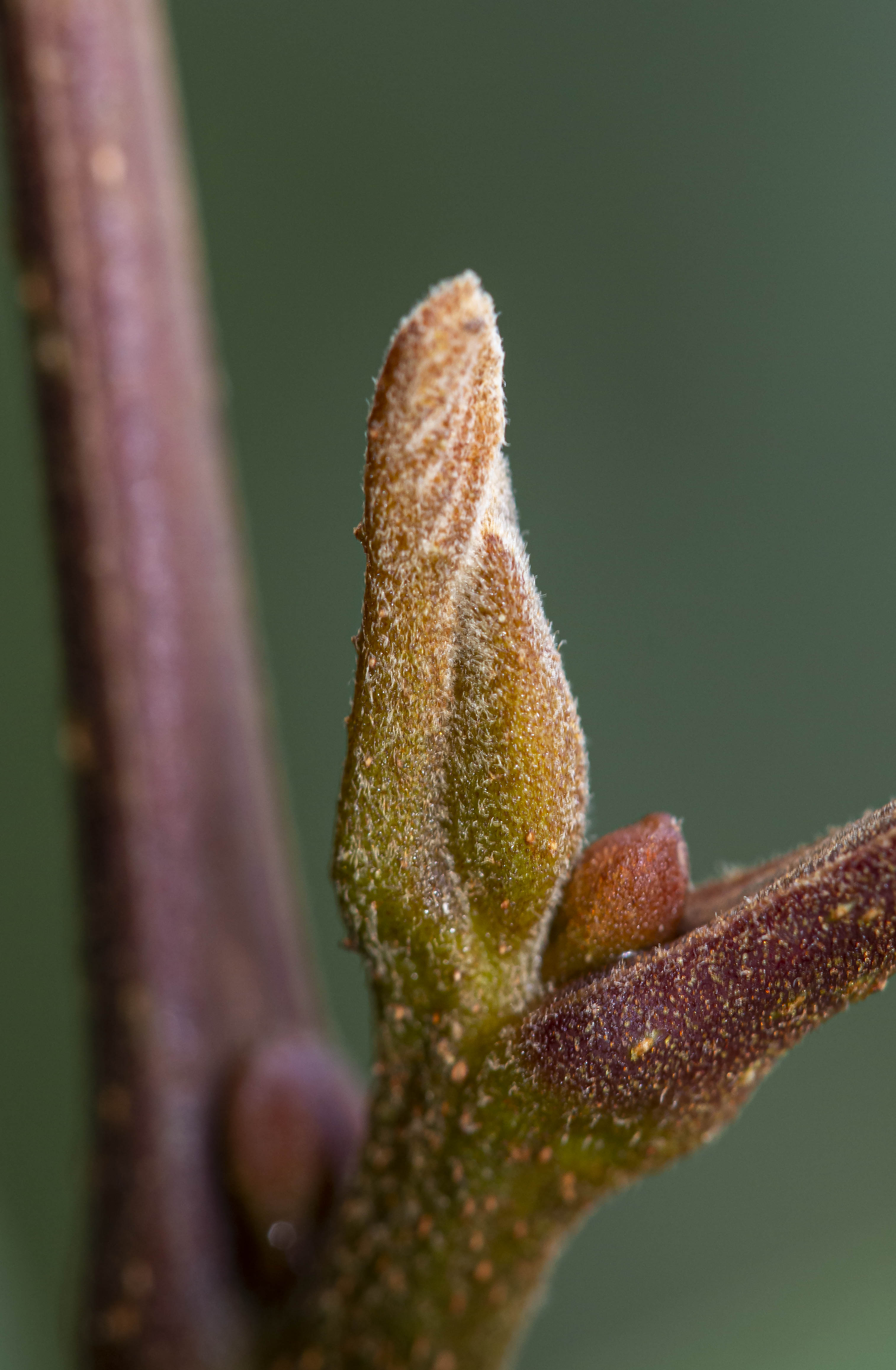
Carya aquatica bud

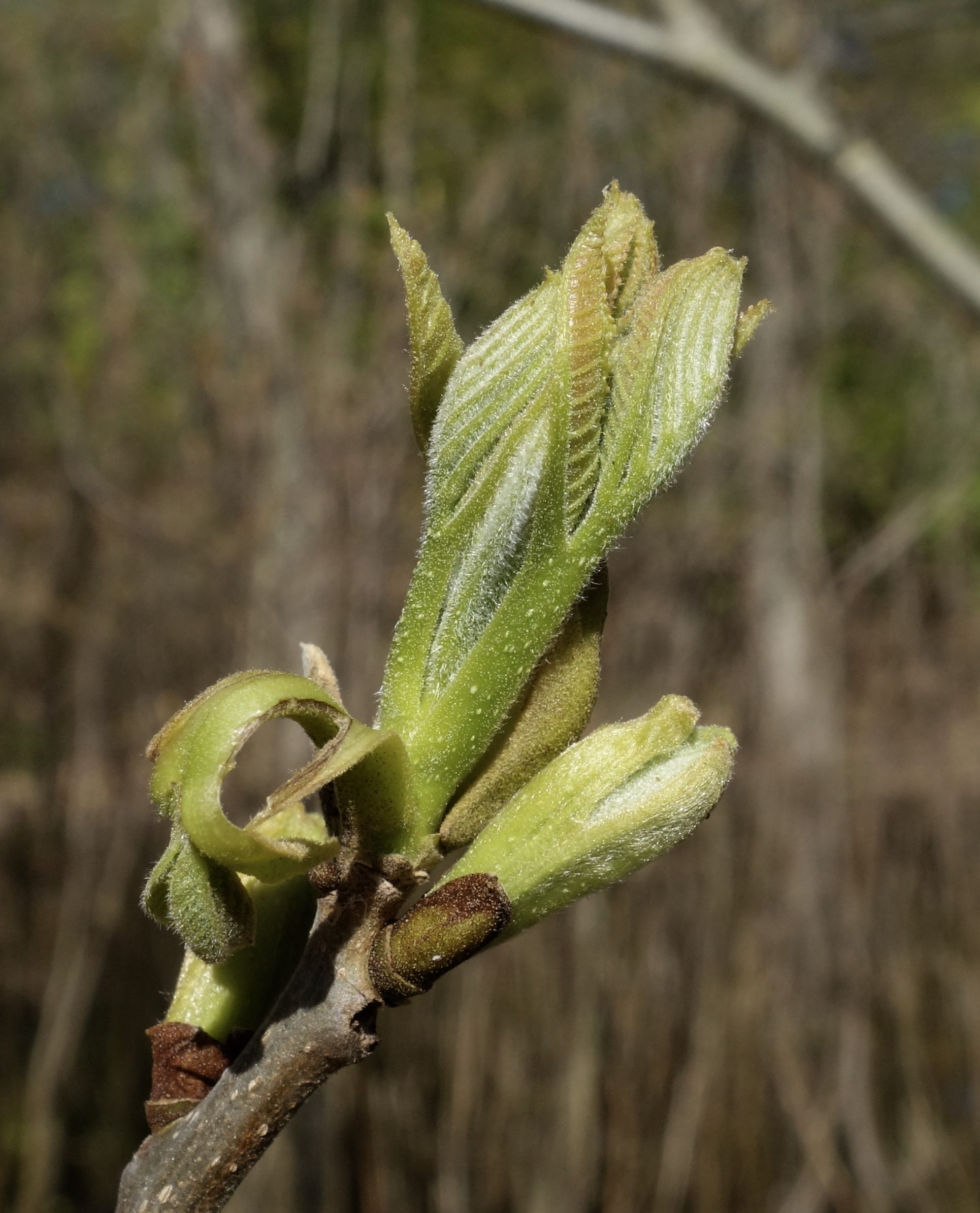
Carya aquatica bud break

Water hickory regenerates aggressively from seeds and sprouts. Seeds germinate and become established on disturbed soil or understory duff. To develop, understory seedlings must be released. Many of our present stands of water hickory, especially on imperfectly drained flats, have been regenerated and released by logging. On poorly drained sites, where competition is not so intense, water hickory grows to fill openings created by windthrow and natural mortality as well as logging.

Flowering and fruiting- Water hickory is monoecious. Male and female flowers appear during April and May, while the leaves are developing. The male flowers are in stalked catkins on branches of the current or previous year, and the female flowers are in short spikes or stalks. The fruit, covered by a thin husk during development, are thin-shelled, flattened, and have a bitter seed. Nuts fall between October and December of the same year.

Seed production and dissemination- Seed production begins when the trees are about 20 years old, or about 20 cm (7.9 in) in d.b.h. Optimum seed-bearing age is from 40 to 75 years, or after the trees reach 51 cm (20 in) in d.b.h. Heavy seed crops are produced in most years, and a thrifty tree may produce up to 70 liters (2 bu) of seeds. There are approximately 440 cleaned seeds per kilogram (200/lb). The seeds are disseminated by water and animals; floodwaters are particularly important in carrying seed to new areas.

Seedling development- After seedfall in the autumn, the seeds lie dormant until germination in late April through early June. Rarely do they remain viable until the second spring. Germination is hypogeal. Sometimes nearly 80 percent of the seed crop germinates. As a result, thickets and clumps of water hickory are not unusual. The species is tolerant enough to survive in the understory for at least 15 years, but full sunlight is necessary for development into trees. The relatively slow height growth of water hickory requires that it have near freedom from competition to establish itself in the overstory. Because of their extended dormant season, water hickory seedlings are able to survive late-spring floods better than most of their would-be competitors.

Vegetative reproduction- Stumps less than 61 cm (24 in) and severed roots of water hickory readily sprout. Sprouts grow three or four times faster than seedlings during the first year or two. Even on poorly drained clay soil, first-year sprouts sometimes are 1.5 m (4.9 ft) tall. Sprouts 4.6 m (15 ft) tall at 5 years have been reported.

Sapling and pole stages to maturity Growth and yield- Water hickory on a good site may reach 33.5 m (110 ft) tall and 91 cm (36 in) in diameter, with about 16 m (52 ft) of merchantable bole. The tall straight trunk is topped by slender to moderately stout ascending branches. Diameter growth of water hickory is slow for southern species, 2 to 8 mm (0.079 to 0.315 in) per year. At 50 years, dominants might average 35 cm (14 in) in d.b.h. on good sites and only 25 cm (9.8 in) on poor sites. Site index at base age 50 years ranges between 20 and 29 m (66 and 95 ft). Slow growth rates are typical of water hickory in competition with oaks, sugarberry, gum, and other species on good sites.

Maximum mean annual production of a pure stand (found rarely) on a good site has been established at 10.5 m³/ha (150 ft³/acre). Maximum mean annual production on medium and poor sites was estimated at 7.0 m³/ha (100 ft³/acre) and 3.5 m³/ha (50 ft³/acre), respectively. An average water hickory site might realistically yield 210 m³/ha (3,000 ft³/acre) at maturity. Slow growth and poor sites usually keep yields low.

Rooting habit- Water hickory, like other hickories, grows a taproot in the seedling stage. The wet clayey soils where water hickory usually is found restricts the entire root system to fairly shallow depths. The taproot eventually becomes the source of a coarse, wide spreading but shallow lateral root system. The taproot of a 30-cm (12-in) individual, excavated on moderately well-drained clayey soil, ended abruptly with three large lateral roots growing out at right angles. Only a few fine roots extended deeper than 50 cm (20 in).

Reaction to competition- Water hickory is classed as intermediate in shade tolerance. Owing to its slow growth, poor quality, and consequent low value, most silvicultural operations are intended to favor species other than water hickory. Much "high-grade" logging has made the species more abundant and widespread than it would have been naturally. Water hickory responds well to release. On better drained sites, cutting or deadening all stems above 5 cm (2.0 in) in d.b.h. should relegate water hickory to a minor position in the future stand. Many seedlings and sprouts may emerge, but most of these are eventually overtopped by faster growing species. In the Overcup Oak-Water Hickory cover type, any kind of harvest will probably result in a major component of water hickory in the future stand. Water control projects that prolong spring flooding tend to favor water hickory.

Damaging agents- Water hickory is occasionally damaged by insects. Of several borers that attack water hickory, the living-hickory borer, Goes pulcher, is the most common. Borer attacks most often occur on young trees up to 14 cm (5.5 in) in diameter. Trunks weakened by tunnels sometimes break, and logs formerly infested by borers are of low value. Although this borer is widely distributed, damaging populations are rather local. Leaf-eating insects, especially the forest tent caterpillar, Malacosoma disstria, occasionally defoliate trees.

Diseases are ordinarily unimportant to water hickory. Butt and stem rots entering through wounds from fire or logging can be a major source of cull. Heart-rot fungi tend to spread faster in the trunks of this species than in associated oaks and other bottom-land hardwoods.

"Shake" disease, most common in situations of waterlogging, is a major contributor to loss of timber value, though yellow-bellied sapsuckers also cause defects. Water hickory is a prominent host for mistletoe (Phoradendron serotinum).

== Special uses ==
The nuts of water hickory are used to a limited extent by ducks, squirrels, feral hogs, and other wildlife. Water hickory is occasionally planted or retained In natural stands for a shade tree. The wood is a locally preferred firewood and sometimes used to make fence posts.

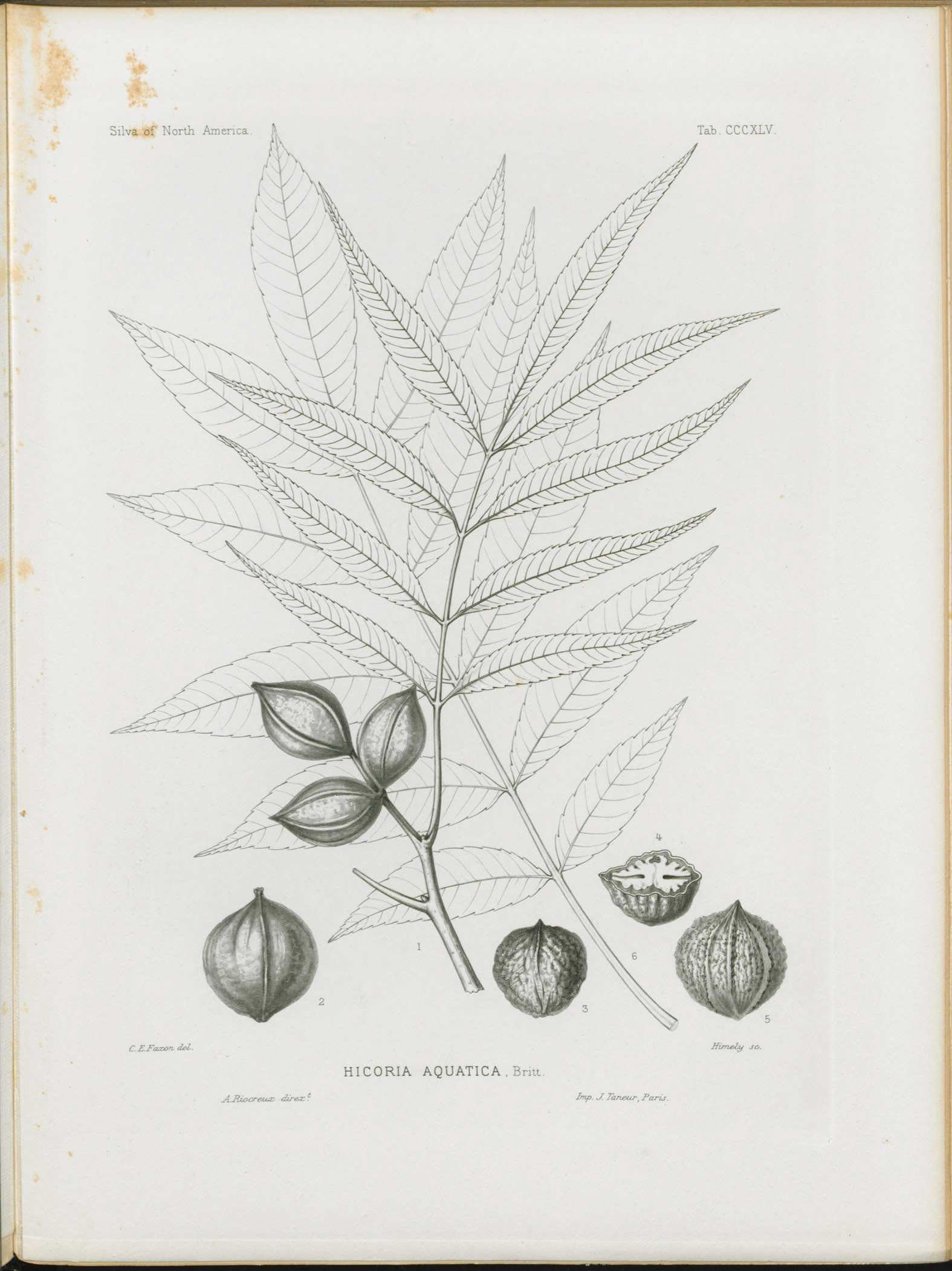
Illustration showing fruits on tree and a nut in cross section

Low floodplains, in which water hickory is a dominant species, are being increasingly recognized for their ability to cleanse drainage water and provide refuge for many threatened species of plants and animals.

== Genetics ==
No races have been recorded; population and geographic variations have not been studied except for the hybrid Carya x lecontei Little (C. aquatica x illinoensis). This hybrid is fairly common where the range of the two parent species overlaps. One other hybrid is recognized, C. x ludoviciana (Ashe) Little (C. aquatica x texana). Water Hickory is a 32 chromosome species (1N = 16).
