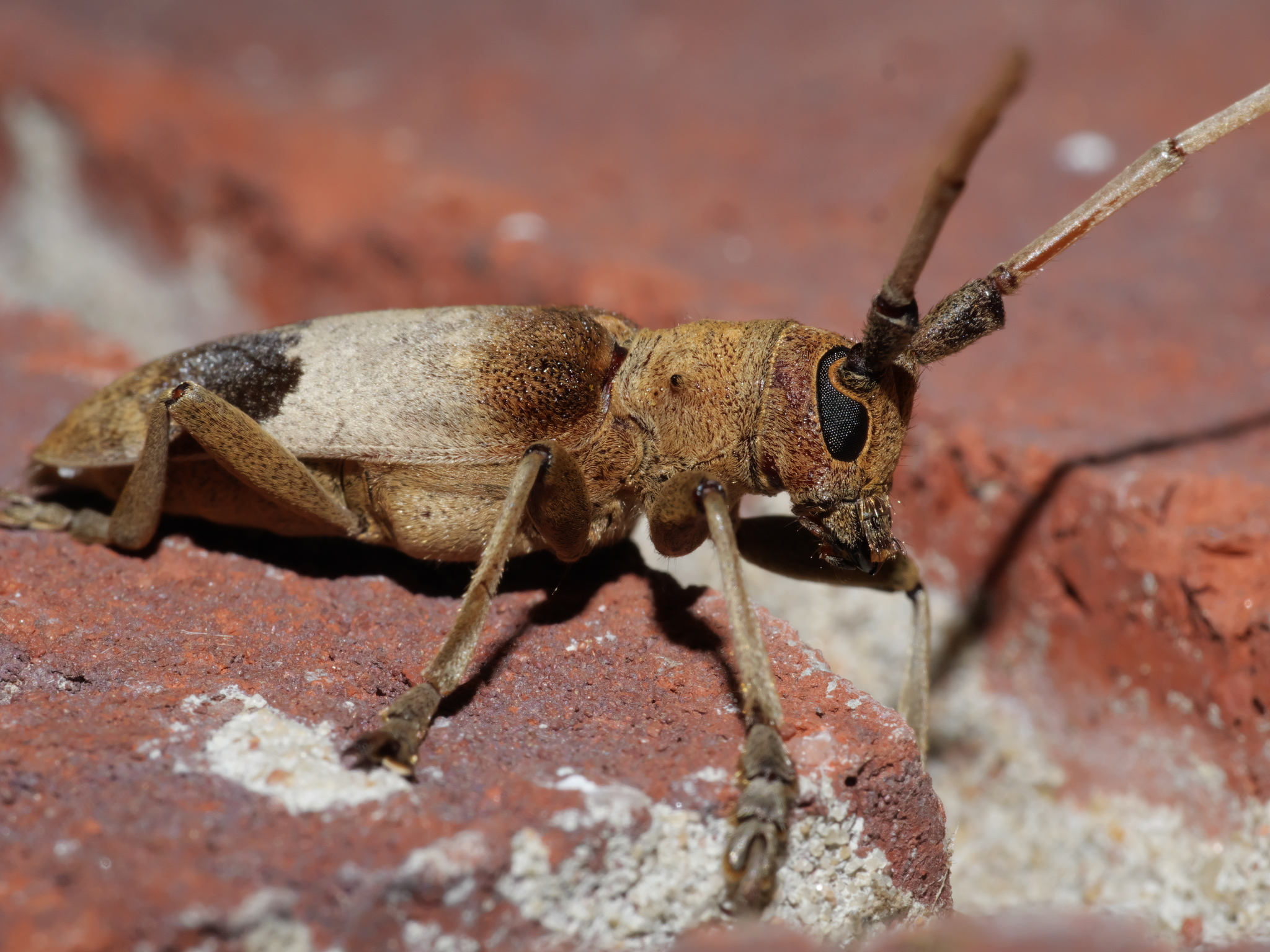
- Goes pulcher, Oklahoma

Scientific classification
- Kingdom: Animalia
- Phylum: Arthropoda
- Clade: Pancrustacea
- Class: Insecta
- Order: Coleoptera
- Suborder: Polyphaga
- Infraorder: Cucujiformia
- Family: Cerambycidae
- Subfamily: Lamiinae
- Tribe: Lamiini
- Genus: Goes
- Species: G. pulcher

Binomial name
- Goes pulcher (Haldeman, 1847)

Synonyms
- Goes pulchra Britton, 1920; Goes pulchar Shufeldt, 1884; Goes pulcher Gemminger & Harold, 1873; Monochamus pulcher Emmons, 1854; Monohammus pulcher Melsheimer, 1853; Monohammus pulcher Haldeman, 1847

= Goes pulcher =

Species of beetle

Goes pulcher, known generally as the living-hickory borer, is a species of flat-faced longhorn in the beetle family Cerambycidae. The common name "living-hickory borer" is sometimes confused with that of Megacyllene caryae, which is called "hickory borer".

Goes pulcher is a relatively uncommon beetle found in eastern North America. Adults may range from 18mm to 27mm in length.

This species was first described by Haldeman in 1847, originally under the genus Monohammus.

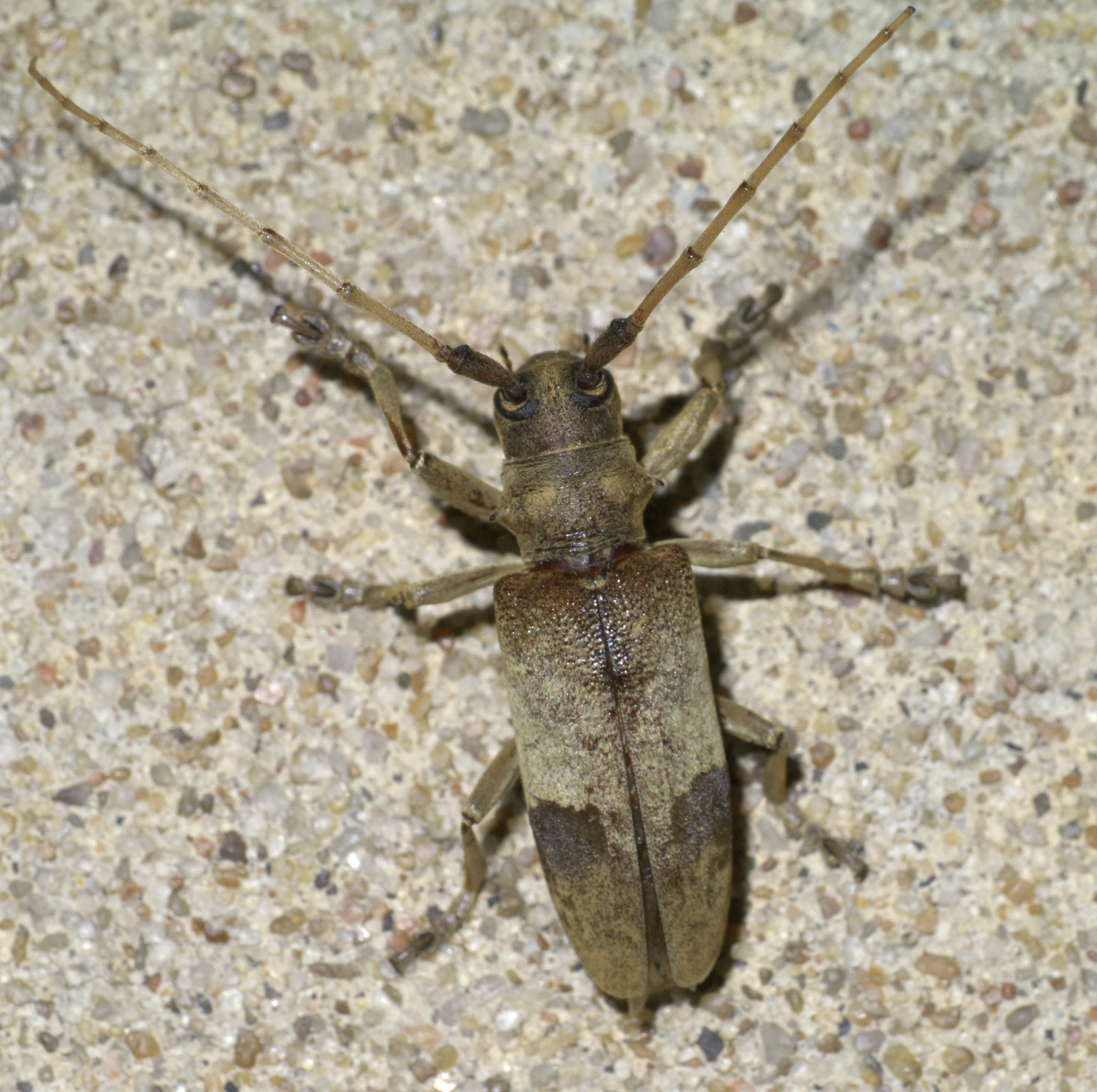
Goes pulcher, living-hickory borer
