= List of Rhopalomyia species =

This is a list of 223 species in the genus Rhopalomyia.

== Rhopalomyia species ==
- Rhopalomyia abdominalis Shinji, 1938
- Rhopalomyia abnormis Felt, 1908
- Rhopalomyia abrotani (Trail, 1886)
- Rhopalomyia achillearum (Kieffer, 1913)
- Rhopalomyia ajgyrcumensis Fedotova, 1999
- Rhopalomyia alatavicus (Fedotova, 2001)
- Rhopalomyia albicerata (Fedotova, 1999)
- Rhopalomyia albipennis Felt, 1908
- Rhopalomyia almataica (Fedotova, 1999)
- Rhopalomyia altaica (Fedotova, 1999)
- Rhopalomyia alticola (Cockerell, 1890)
- Rhopalomyia ambrosiae Gagne, 1975
- Rhopalomyia ambrosinae Gagne, 2004
- Rhopalomyia ampullaria Felt, 1916
- Rhopalomyia annua (Fedotova, 1999)
- Rhopalomyia antennariae (Wheeler, 1889)
- Rhopalomyia anthoides Gagne, 1983
- Rhopalomyia anthophila (Osten Sacken, 1869)
- Rhopalomyia apicata (Felt, 1908)
- Rhopalomyia aralensis (Fedotova, 2001)
- Rhopalomyia aralocaspica Fedotova, 1995
- Rhopalomyia arcuata Felt, 1907
- Rhopalomyia ardynka (Fedotova, 1999)
- Rhopalomyia arenariaflora (Fedotova, 1999)
- Rhopalomyia arenariagemma (Fedotova, 1999)
- Rhopalomyia artemisiae (Bouché, 1834)
- Rhopalomyia astericaulis Felt, 1907
- Rhopalomyia asteriflorae Felt, 1907
- Rhopalomyia audibertiae Felt, 1907 (sage leaf gall midge)
- Rhopalomyia baccarum (Wachtl, 1883)
- Rhopalomyia baccharis Felt, 1908 (coyote brush twisted stem gall midge)
- Rhopalomyia balchanica (Fedotova, 1999)
- Rhopalomyia barsukensis (Fedotova, 2001)
- Rhopalomyia baudysi Vimmer, 1928
- Rhopalomyia bedeguaris (Kieffer & Jörgensen, 1910)
- Rhopalomyia bergi (Fedotova, 1999)
- Rhopalomyia betheliana Cockerell, 1909
- Rhopalomyia bigeloviae (Cockerell, 1889)
- Rhopalomyia bigeloviaestrobiloides (Townsend, 1894)
- Rhopalomyia bigelovioides Felt, 1908
- Rhopalomyia botryosa Fedotova, 1984
- Rhopalomyia brevibulla Gagne, 1983
- Rhopalomyia bulbula Felt, 1908
- Rhopalomyia californica Felt, 1908 (coyote brush bud gall midge)
- Rhopalomyia callicarpae Shinji, 1939
- Rhopalomyia calvipomum Gagne, 1983
- Rhopalomyia campestris (Rübsaamen, 1916)
- Rhopalomyia capitata Felt, 1908
- Rhopalomyia carolina Felt, 1908
- Rhopalomyia caterva Monzen, 1937
- Rhopalomyia chionophylla (Fedotova, 1999)
- Rhopalomyia chrysanthemi (Ahlberg, 1939)
- Rhopalomyia chrysanthemum Monzen, 1937
- Rhopalomyia chrysopsidis (Loew, 1862)
- Rhopalomyia chrysothamni Felt, 1916 (chrysanthemum gall midge)
- Rhopalomyia cinerarius Monzen, 1937
- Rhopalomyia clarkei Felt, 1907
- Rhopalomyia clinata Gagne, 1975
- Rhopalomyia cockerelli Felt, 1915
- Rhopalomyia coloradella (Cockerell, 1904)
- Rhopalomyia conica Gagne, 1983
- Rhopalomyia cramboides Gagne, 1983
- Rhopalomyia crassulina (Cockerell, 1908)
- Rhopalomyia cristaegalli Kieffer, 1898
- Rhopalomyia cruziana Felt, 1908
- Rhopalomyia culmata Gagne, 1983
- Rhopalomyia disciformans Kovalev, 1967
- Rhopalomyia dracunculiflora (Fedotova, 1999)
- Rhopalomyia efremovi (Fedotova, 1999)
- Rhopalomyia ehstragoni (Fedotova, 1999)
- Rhopalomyia enceliae Felt, 1916
- Rhopalomyia ericameriae Felt, 1916
- Rhopalomyia erigerontis Felt, 1916
- Rhopalomyia erii (Felt, 1912)
- Rhopalomyia euthamiae (Stebbins, 1910)
- Rhopalomyia flavipalpis Vimmer, 1928
- Rhopalomyia floccosa (Felt, 1916)
- Rhopalomyia florella Gagne, 1983
- Rhopalomyia florum (Kieffer, 1890)
- Rhopalomyia foliorum (Loew, 1850)
- Rhopalomyia frigida Fedotova, 1999
- Rhopalomyia fusiformae Felt, 1907
- Rhopalomyia gelleri (Fedotova, 1999)
- Rhopalomyia gemmaria (Stebbins, 1910)
- Rhopalomyia gerasimovi (Fedotova, 1999)
- Rhopalomyia giraldii Kieffer & Trotter, 1900
- Rhopalomyia globifex Kieffer & Jörgensen, 1910
- Rhopalomyia glutinosa Felt, 1916
- Rhopalomyia gnaphalodis Felt, 1911
- Rhopalomyia goodeniae Kolesik, 1996
- Rhopalomyia gossypina Gagne, 1983
- Rhopalomyia grindeliae Felt, 1916
- Rhopalomyia grossulariae Felt, 1911 (gooseberry gall midge)
- Rhopalomyia gutierreziae (Cockerell, 1901)
- Rhopalomyia gynaptera (Mamaev, 1972)
- Rhopalomyia haasi Kieffer, 1905
- Rhopalomyia heptapotamica (Fedotova, 1999)
- Rhopalomyia hirtibulla Gagne, 1983
- Rhopalomyia hirticaulis Gagne, 1983
- Rhopalomyia hirtipes (Osten Sacken, 1862)
- Rhopalomyia hirtipomum (Gagne, 1983)
- Rhopalomyia hispanica Tavares, 1904
- Rhopalomyia hypogaea (Low, 1885)
- Rhopalomyia hyssopi Fedotova, 1983
- Rhopalomyia ilexifoliae Shinji, 1944
- Rhopalomyia iliica Fedotova, 1999
- Rhopalomyia incognita Fedotova, 1995
- Rhopalomyia inquisitor Felt, 1908
- Rhopalomyia integrifoliae Lehr, 2001
- Rhopalomyia iwatensis Shinji, 1938
- Rhopalomyia japonica Monzen, 1937
- Rhopalomyia jaxartica (Fedotova, 1999)
- Rhopalomyia junceaflora (Fedotova, 1999)
- Rhopalomyia karatavica Fedotova, 1999
- Rhopalomyia karmyshevae (Fedotova, 1999)
- Rhopalomyia kashkarovi (Fedotova, 1999)
- Rhopalomyia kemrudica Fedotova, 1999
- Rhopalomyia kiefferi Trotter, 1900
- Rhopalomyia koktalica (Fedotova, 1999)
- Rhopalomyia korovini (Fedotova, 1999)
- Rhopalomyia kozlovi Fedotova, 1999
- Rhopalomyia kugitangica (Fedotova, 1999)
- Rhopalomyia kunini (Fedotova, 1999)
- Rhopalomyia lanceolata Felt, 1908
- Rhopalomyia lateriflori Felt, 1908
- Rhopalomyia lawrenciae Kolesik, 1998
- Rhopalomyia lignea Gagne, 1983
- Rhopalomyia lignitubus Gagne, 1983
- Rhopalomyia lippiae Kieffer & Jörgensen, 1910
- Rhopalomyia lobata Felt, 1908
- Rhopalomyia lobulifera Mamaev, 1990
- Rhopalomyia longitubifex (Shinji, 1938)
- Rhopalomyia lonicera Felt, 1925
- Rhopalomyia luetkemuelleri Thomas, 1893
- Rhopalomyia magnusi Rübsaamen, 1893
- Rhopalomyia major Felt, 1907
- Rhopalomyia malajsaryensis (Fedotova, 1999)
- Rhopalomyia mammilla Gagne, 1983
- Rhopalomyia mangyshlakensis Fedotova, 1999
- Rhopalomyia medusa Gagne, 1983
- Rhopalomyia medusirrasa Gagne, 1983
- Rhopalomyia micranthae Fedotova, 1995
- Rhopalomyia millefolii (Loew, 1850)
- Rhopalomyia mojinkumensis (Fedotova, 1999)
- Rhopalomyia mongolica Mamaev, 1972
- Rhopalomyia monogynasphaera Fedotova, 1999
- Rhopalomyia monogynus (Fedotova, 2001)
- Rhopalomyia navasi Tavares, 1904
- Rhopalomyia nothofagi Gagne, 1973
- Rhopalomyia nucula Gagne, 1983
- Rhopalomyia obovata Gagne, 1983
- Rhopalomyia occidentalis (Felt, 1916)
- Rhopalomyia olgae (Fedotova, 1999)
- Rhopalomyia oreiplana Kieffer & Jörgensen, 1910
- Rhopalomyia palearum (Kieffer, 1890)
- Rhopalomyia palustris Felt, 1908
- Rhopalomyia paratubifex Kovalev, 1967
- Rhopalomyia pavlovi Fedotova, 1999
- Rhopalomyia pedicellata Felt, 1908
- Rhopalomyia pevtsovi Fedotova, 1999
- Rhopalomyia pevtzovi (Fedotova, 1999)
- Rhopalomyia pilosa Felt, 1908
- Rhopalomyia pini Felt, 1907
- Rhopalomyia plumula Fedotova, 1995
- Rhopalomyia polyni (Fedotova, 1999)
- Rhopalomyia pomum Gagne, 1975 (sponge gall midge)
- Rhopalomyia potanini Fedotova, 1999
- Rhopalomyia producticeps Kieffer, 1912
- Rhopalomyia prosopidis Kieffer & Jörgensen, 1910
- Rhopalomyia pseudofoliorum Vimmer, 1924
- Rhopalomyia ptarmicae (Vallot, 1850)
- Rhopalomyia racemicola Felt, 1907
- Rhopalomyia ruebsaameni Thomas, 1893
- Rhopalomyia rugosa Gagne, 1983
- Rhopalomyia saissanica (Fedotova, 1999)
- Rhopalomyia salsolae Tavares, 1924
- Rhopalomyia salviae Felt, 1916
- Rhopalomyia santolina (Fedotova, 1999)
- Rhopalomyia santolinae Tavares, 1902
- Rhopalomyia santolinifolia (Fedotova, 1999)
- Rhopalomyia saurica (Fedotova, 1999)
- Rhopalomyia schrenkiana Fedotova, 1999
- Rhopalomyia scoparia (Fedotova, 1999)
- Rhopalomyia scopariaflora (Fedotova, 1999)
- Rhopalomyia senekensis (Fedotova, 2001)
- Rhopalomyia shevczenkoi Fedotova, 1999
- Rhopalomyia shinjii Gagne, 1975
- Rhopalomyia simulans Vimmer, 1924
- Rhopalomyia simultanea Fedotova, 1984
- Rhopalomyia solidaginis (Loew, 1862) (goldenrod bunch gall)
- Rhopalomyia soongarica (Fedotova, 1999)
- Rhopalomyia spongiosa Fedotova, 1995
- Rhopalomyia strobiligemma (Stebbings, 1910)
- Rhopalomyia struma Monzen, 1937
- Rhopalomyia subhumilis Gagne, 1977
- Rhopalomyia sulcata Gagne, 1995
- Rhopalomyia syngenesiae (Loew, 1850)
- Rhopalomyia talassica (Fedotova, 1999)
- Rhopalomyia tanaceticola (Karsch, 1879)
- Rhopalomyia tavaresi Gagne, 1975
- Rhopalomyia terraealbae (Fedotova, 2001)
- Rhopalomyia terskeica Fedotova, 1995
- Rhopalomyia tetradymia (Felt, 1925)
- Rhopalomyia thompsoni Felt, 1907
- Rhopalomyia tianschanica Fedotova, 1995
- Rhopalomyia tjulkubasica (Fedotova, 1999)
- Rhopalomyia tomentella (Fedotova, 1999)
- Rhopalomyia tricyclae Kieffer & Jörgensen, 1910
- Rhopalomyia tridentatae Rubsaamen, 1893
- Rhopalomyia tripleurospermi Skuhrava & Hinz, 2000
- Rhopalomyia truncata (Felt, 1907)
- Rhopalomyia truncula Foote, 1965
- Rhopalomyia tubifex (Bouché, 1847)
- Rhopalomyia tubulus Gagne, 1983
- Rhopalomyia tumidibulla Gagne, 1983
- Rhopalomyia tumidicaulis Gagne, 1983
- Rhopalomyia uetsukii Inouye, 1959
- Rhopalomyia uniloculata Fedotova, 1984
- Rhopalomyia utahensis Felt, 1916
- Rhopalomyia verbenae Kieffer & Jörgensen, 1910
- Rhopalomyia weldi Felt, 1921
- Rhopalomyia yomogicola (Matsumura, 1931)
- Rhopalomyia yrgajtensis (Fedotova, 1999)
