= Rhopalomyia thompsoni =

Scientific classification
- Kingdom: Animalia
- Phylum: Arthropoda
- Class: Insecta
- Order: Diptera
- Family: Cecidomyiidae
- Supertribe: Lasiopteridi
- Tribe: Oligotrophini
- Genus: Rhopalomyia
- Species: R. thompsoni

Binomial name
- Rhopalomyia thompsoni (Felt, 1907)

Species of fly

Rhopalomyia thompsoni is a species of gall midges, insects in the family Cecidomyiidae. It induces galls on the host Solidago altissima across much of North America.

This species has two generations per year, both of which develop in rhizome galls. The spring generation galls are solitary or clustered, bulbous, fleshy masses with 1–8 chambers each. The second generation galls constitute brownish, globular and usually multi-chambered swellings of the rhizomes. Pupation took place in late August to early September, at which time the galls became elongate and fleshier. Shortly before adult emergence the galls became apparent above the soil surface, and adults emerged from mid to late September. Males have robust gonopods with wide gonocoxal apodeme and ventral, meso-apical projection of the gonocoxite. Females of have neckless flagellomeres and very long and slender abdominal tergite 8 with mesally arched arms.
