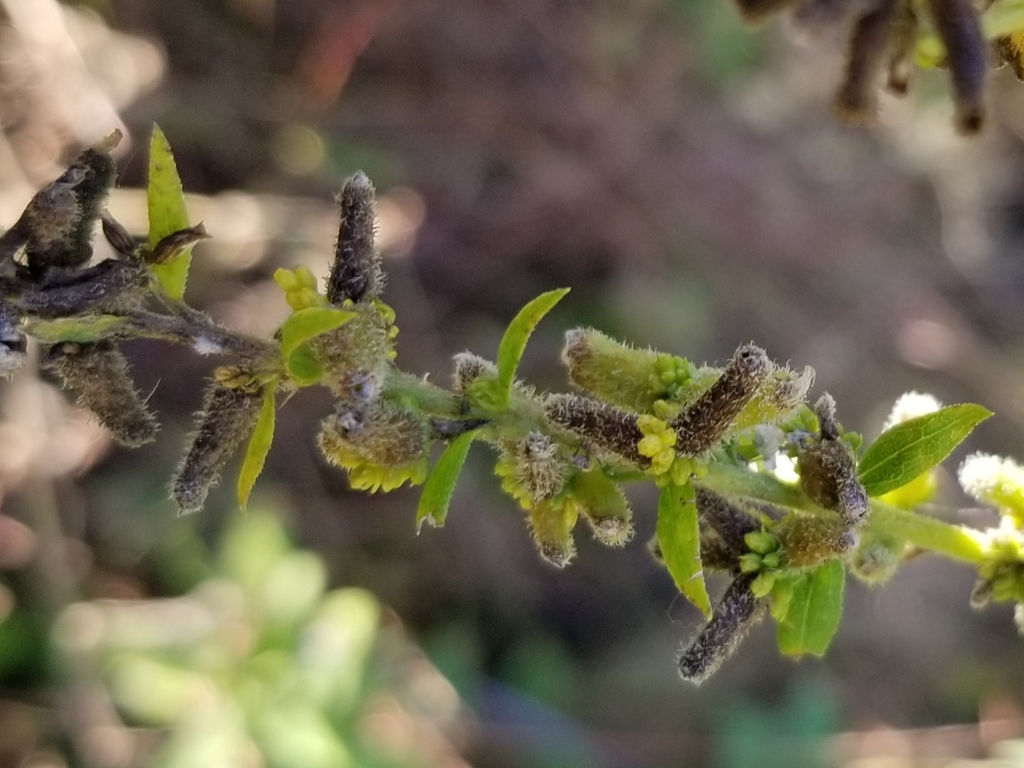
- R. anthophila gall

Scientific classification
- Kingdom: Animalia
- Phylum: Arthropoda
- Class: Insecta
- Order: Diptera
- Family: Cecidomyiidae
- Supertribe: Lasiopteridi
- Tribe: Oligotrophini
- Genus: Rhopalomyia
- Species: R. anthophila

Binomial name
- Rhopalomyia anthophila (Osten Sacken, 1869)

Synonyms
- Cecidomyia anthophila Osten Sacken, 1869

= Rhopalomyia anthophila =

Species of fly

Rhopalomyia anthophila the Downy Flower Gall Midge is a species of gall midges, insects in the family Cecidomyiidae. It induces galls on the host Solidago altissima across much of North America.

== Galls and Biology ==
The gall that is a modified capitulum, which is cylindrical and measures 5–10 mm (0.20–0.39 in) in length and 2–3.5 mm (0.08–0.14 in) in width. It is usually slightly wider bassaly than at its tip and is covered by short, white hairs that give it a fuzzy appearance. The gall is green, situated among normal capitula, accompanied by tiny leaves and/or ray florets at its base. The gall contains a single chamber with an inner, conical chamber that contains a single larva facing downwards. Larvae turn to face upwards before pupation. Galls become apparent in mid-August, and pupation takes place in late August to mid-September.
