= Rhopalomyia baccharis =

Scientific classification
- Domain: Eukaryota
- Kingdom: Animalia
- Phylum: Arthropoda
- Class: Insecta
- Order: Diptera
- Family: Cecidomyiidae
- Supertribe: Lasiopteridi
- Tribe: Oligotrophini
- Genus: Rhopalomyia
- Species: R. baccharis

Binomial name
- Rhopalomyia baccharis Felt, 1908

Species of fly

Rhopalomyia baccharis, the coyote brush twisted stem gall midge, is a species of gall midges, insects in the family Cecidomyiidae.
