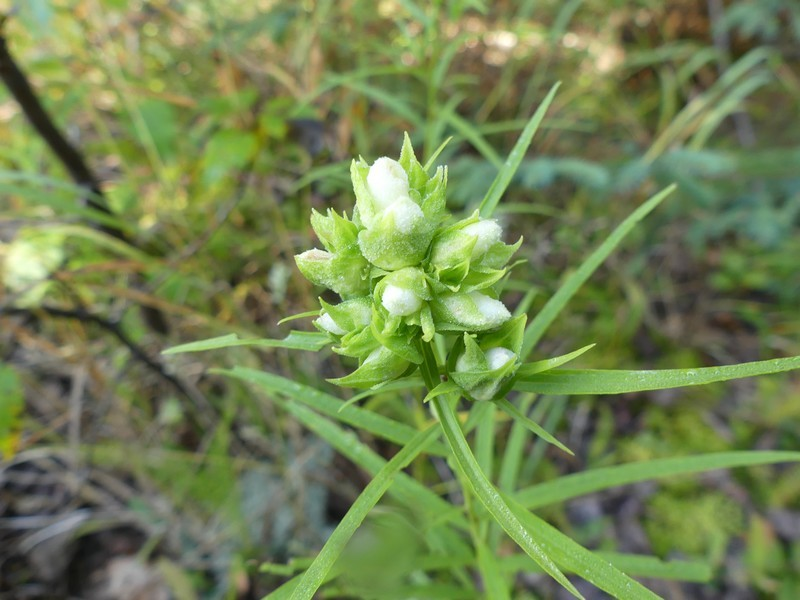
- Galls caused by Rhopalomyia lobata

Scientific classification
- Kingdom: Animalia
- Phylum: Arthropoda
- Class: Insecta
- Order: Diptera
- Family: Cecidomyiidae
- Supertribe: Lasiopteridi
- Tribe: Oligotrophini
- Genus: Rhopalomyia
- Species: R. lobata

Binomial name
- Rhopalomyia lobata Felt, 1908

= Rhopalomyia lobata =

Species of fly

Rhopalomyia lobata is a species of gall midges, insects in the family Cecidomyiidae. The galls form on stems and buds of Euthamia graminifolia the grass-leaved goldenrod . The species ranges from Florida to Mississippi, north to Oregon, New England and most of Canada.

== Galls and Biology ==
The galls, which have multiple chambers, are created in both the apical and lateral buds. Some of these galls can be found in clusters near the shoot tip or in adjacent lateral buds. The spongy mass at the base of the gall gradually grows to a final size of 6 cm in diameter. The leaves encircling the mass are wider than the typical leaves of the plant, but they start to become loose in the second week of June. The whitish tissue is then visible, and there are 5-35 larval chambers embedded within. During late June to mid-July, the adults emerge, exposing the fleshy core of the gall. After the midges emerge, the gall turns black, and dry galls are present on the plants for several weeks.
