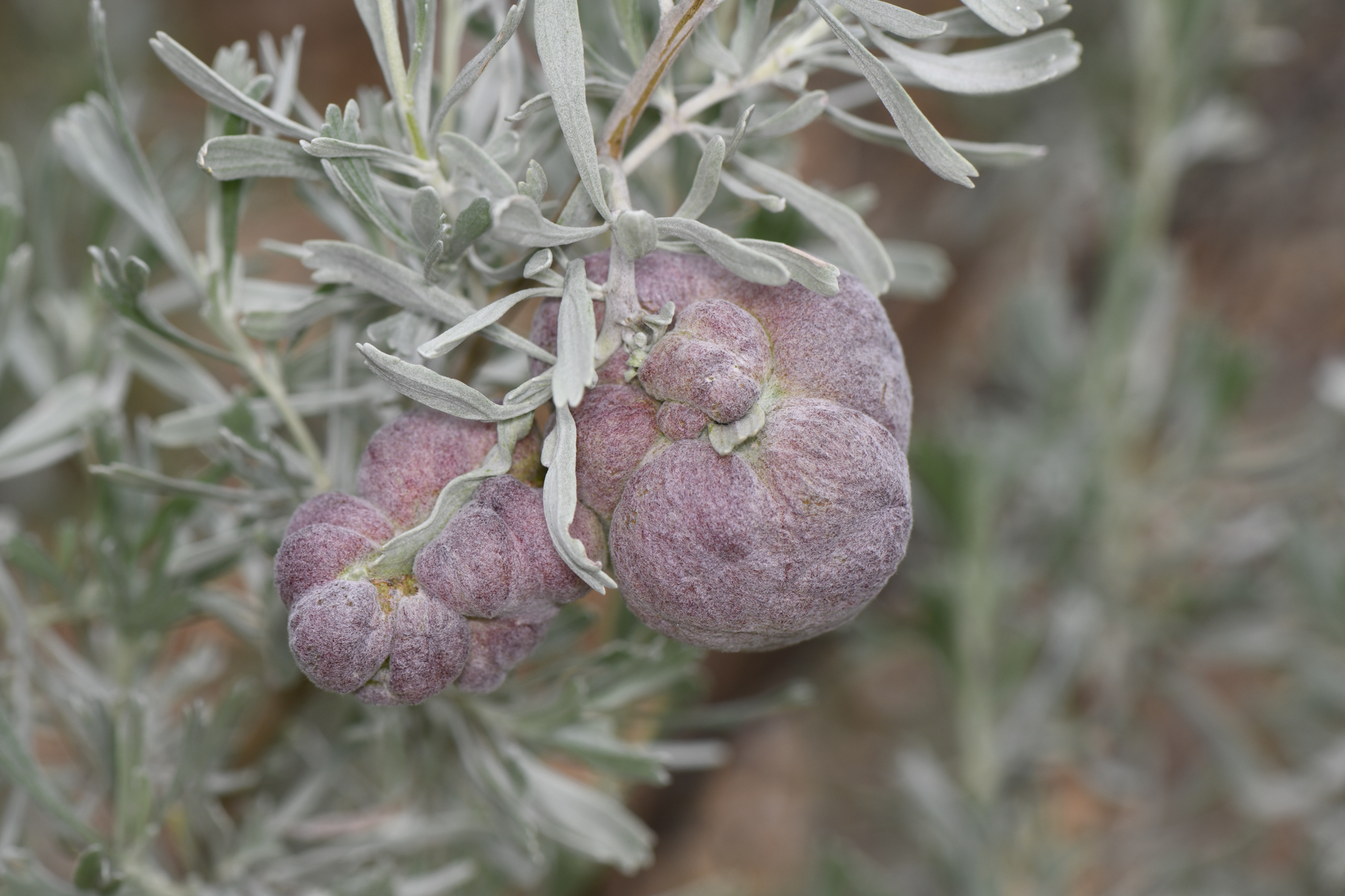
- Leaf galls caused by Rhopalomyia pomum

Scientific classification
- Domain: Eukaryota
- Kingdom: Animalia
- Phylum: Arthropoda
- Class: Insecta
- Order: Diptera
- Family: Cecidomyiidae
- Supertribe: Lasiopteridi
- Tribe: Oligotrophini
- Genus: Rhopalomyia
- Species: R. pomum

Binomial name
- Rhopalomyia pomum Gagne, 1975

Synonyms
- Diarthronomyia artemisiae Felt, 1908

= Rhopalomyia pomum =

Species of fly

Rhopalomyia pomum, the sponge gall midge, is a species of gall midges, insects in the family Cecidomyiidae. The midges form leaf galls on Great Basin sagebrush (Artemisia tridentata).
