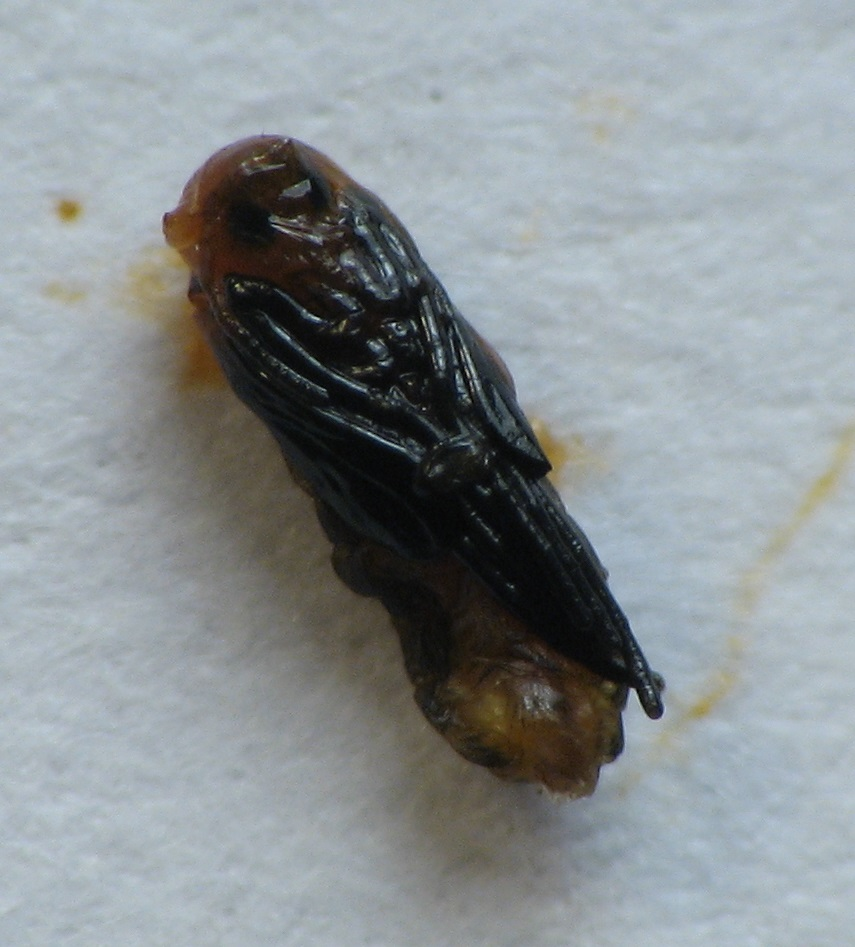
- Pupa

Scientific classification
- Kingdom: Animalia
- Phylum: Arthropoda
- Class: Insecta
- Order: Diptera
- Family: Cecidomyiidae
- Supertribe: Lasiopteridi
- Tribe: Oligotrophini
- Genus: Rhopalomyia
- Species: R. clarkei

Binomial name
- Rhopalomyia clarkei Felt, 1907

= Rhopalomyia clarkei =

Species of fly

Rhopalomyia clarkei is a species of gall midges, insects in the family Cecidomyiidae. The larvae induce galls on two hosts: Solidago altissima and Solidago rugosa and are found in north-eastern and north central North America.

== Galls and Biology ==
The galls are small, conical, and single-chambered, and typically occur on the lower side of leaves but sometimes on the upper side of leaves and on stems. Each gall contains a single white larva and is attached to either a major or minor vein when on leaves. On Solidago rugosa, the galls are 2.5–6 mm (0.10–0.24 in) long and .7–1.2 mm (0.03–0.05 in) wide at the widest part, tapering toward the apex, green to yellowish green, and covered by short, whitish hairs. Young galls may sometimes have a tuft of hair at their base, almost as long as the gall itself.

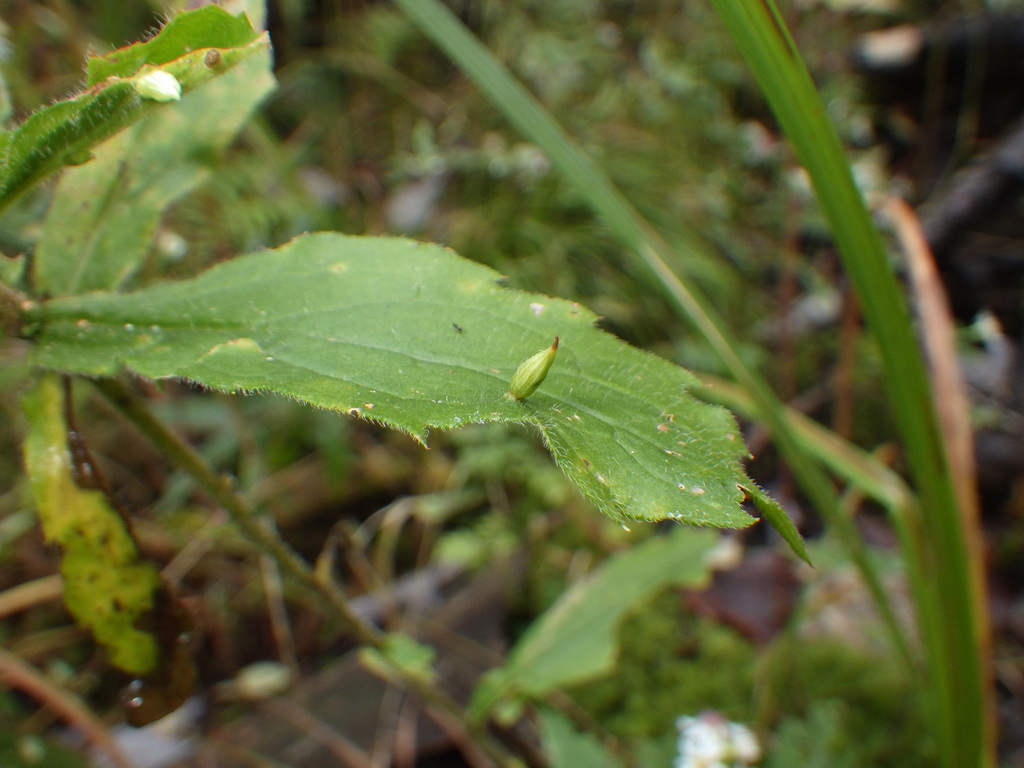
R.clarkei gall on Solidago

The adult female is 2 mm long with a dull red abdomen and 17 antennal segments.
