= Coleophora rugosae =

Scientific classification
- Kingdom: Animalia
- Phylum: Arthropoda
- Class: Insecta
- Order: Lepidoptera
- Family: Coleophoridae
- Genus: Coleophora
- Species: C. rugosae

Binomial name
- Coleophora rugosae McDunnough, 1956

Synonyms
- Coleophora duplicis rugosae McDunnough, 1956; Coleophora rugosae Wright, 1983

Species of moth

Coleophora rugosae is a moth of the family Coleophoridae. It is found in Canada, including Nova Scotia.

The larvae feed on the seeds of Solidago rugosa. They create a trivalved, tubular silken case.
