= Acericecis =

Scientific classification
- Kingdom: Animalia
- Phylum: Arthropoda
- Class: Insecta
- Order: Diptera
- Family: Cecidomyiidae
- Supertribe: Lasiopteridi
- Genus: Acericecis; Gagne, 1983

Genus of flies

Acericecis is a genus of gall midges in the family Cecidomyiidae. There are five described species in Acericecis, one of which is known only from fossils. All extant species induce galls on the leaves of maples. All species are known only from the Holarctic. The genus was first described by American entomologist Raymond Gagne. The type species is Acericecis occellaris.

== Species ==
The five species in the genus Acericecis are:

- Acericecis campestre Harris, 2004
- † Acericecis chaneyi (Cockerell, 1927)
- Acericecis ocellaris (Osten Sacken, 1862) (ocellate gall midge)
- Acericecis szepligetii (Kieffer, 1902)
- Acericecis vitrina (Kieffer, 1909)
