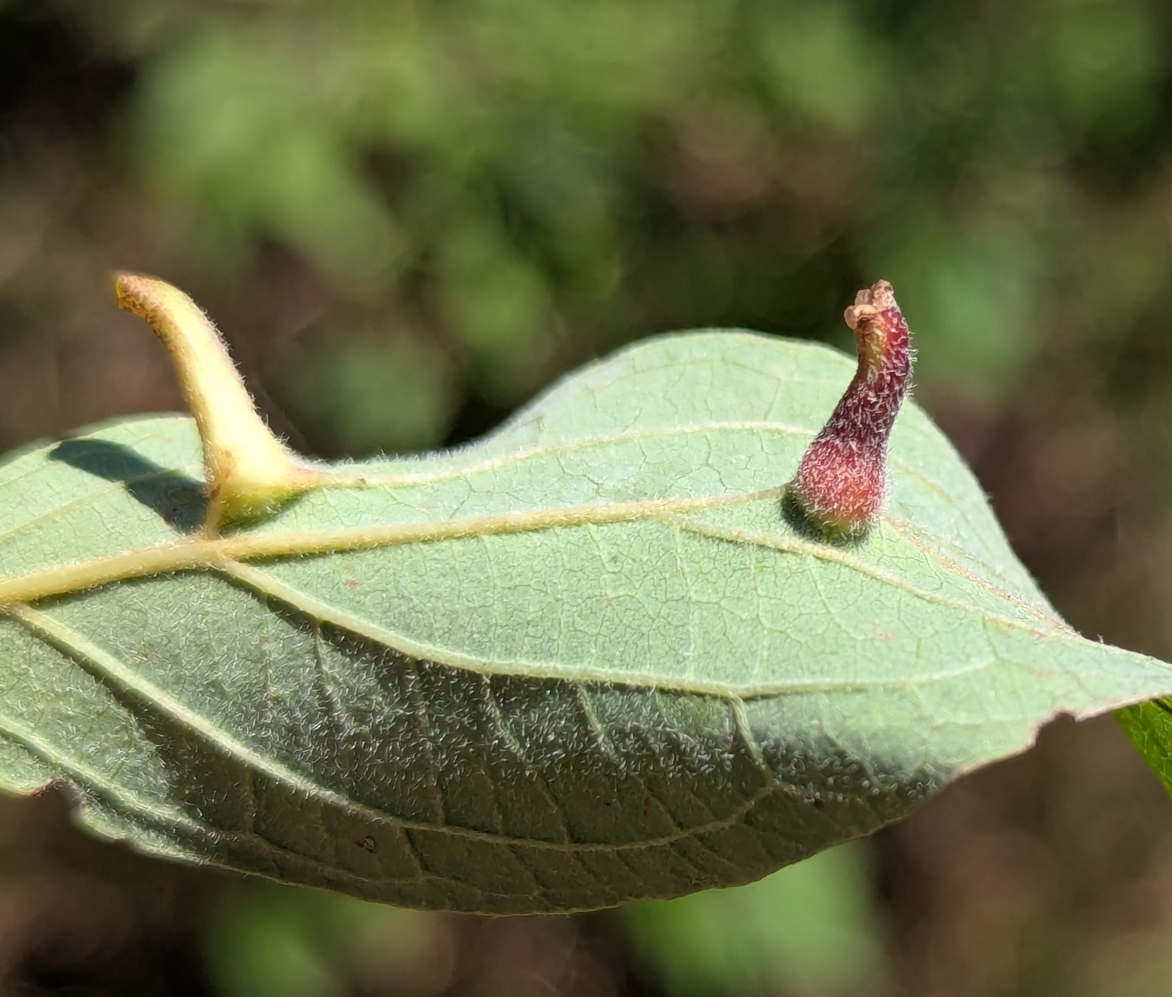
- The gall formed by C. tuba, on the leaf of Cornus drummondii, Lincoln, NE, 2025

Scientific classification
- Kingdom: Animalia
- Phylum: Arthropoda
- Class: Insecta
- Order: Diptera
- Family: Cecidomyiidae
- Genus: Craneiobia
- Species: C. tuba

Binomial name
- Craneiobia tuba (Stebbins, 1910)
- Craneiobia tuba range, estimated with the iNaturalist Geomodel, 2025

Synonyms
- Cecidomyia tuba Stebbins, 1910

= Craneiobia tuba =

Species of fly

Craneiobia tuba is a species of gall midges, insects in the family Cecidomyiidae. The flies are known for inducing long cylindrical galls on four dogwood species: C. amomum, C. drummondii, C. racemosa, and C. sericea. The galls form on the midrib or leaf veins, and are generally red or green and hairy.

== Ecology ==
Adult females lay their eggs on dogwood leaves as they unfold in the spring. Before the gall is formed, Craneiobia tuba eggs and larvae can be parasitized by parasitoid wasps from the family Platygasteridae. Galls will form by the summer, with distinct chambers for each larva. After the larvae complete four instars, they emerge in late fall and spend the winter buried underground in cocoons.
