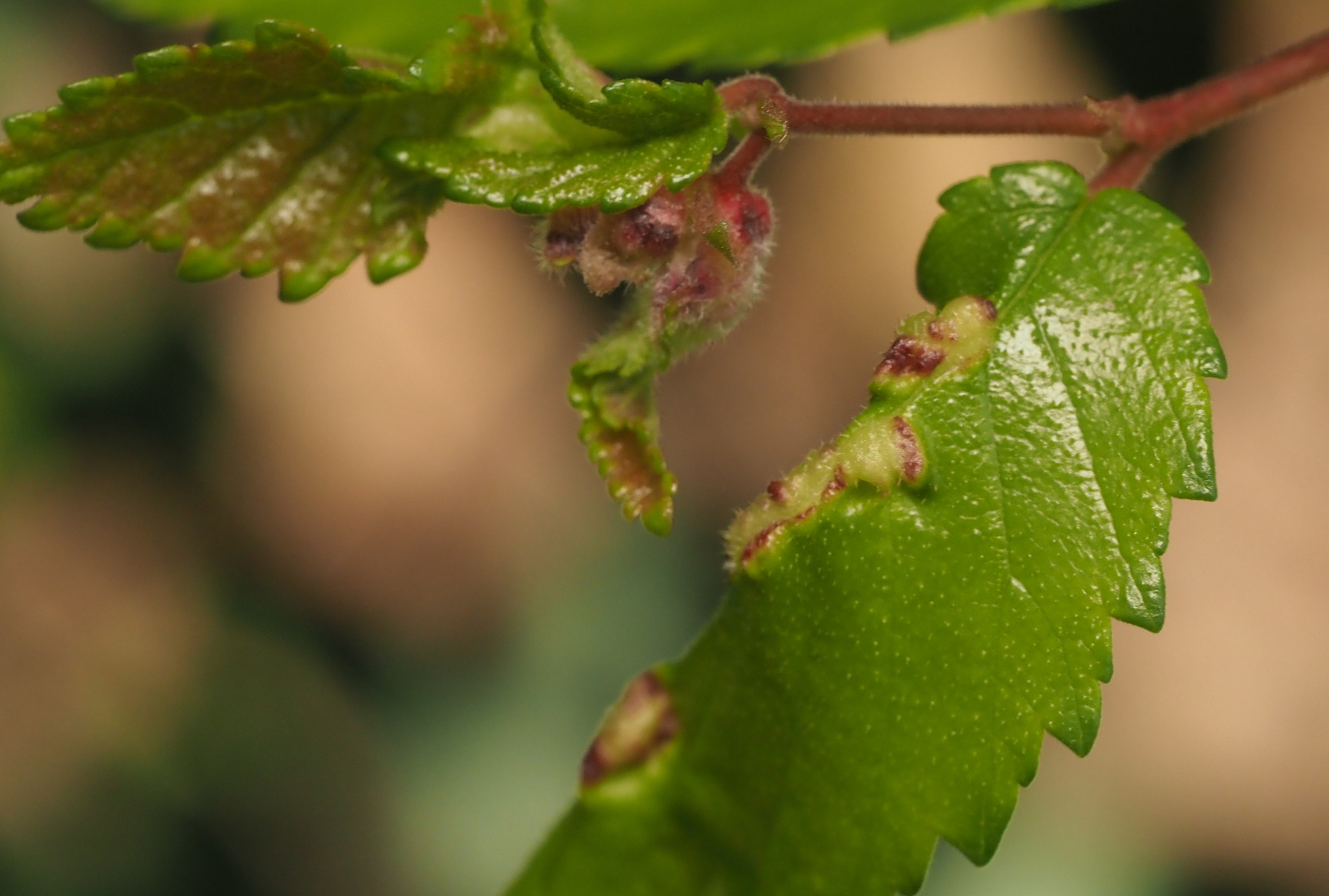

Scientific classification
- Domain: Eukaryota
- Kingdom: Animalia
- Phylum: Arthropoda
- Class: Insecta
- Order: Diptera
- Family: Cecidomyiidae
- Genus: Janetiella
- Species: J. ulmii

Binomial name
- Janetiella ulmii (Beutenmuller, 1907)

Synonyms
- Mayetiola ulmii Beutenmuller, 1907

= Janetiella ulmii =

Species of fly

Janetiella ulmii is a species of gall midges in the family Cecidomyiidae.
