= Rhopalomyia floccosa =

Scientific classification
- Kingdom: Animalia
- Phylum: Arthropoda
- Clade: Pancrustacea
- Class: Insecta
- Order: Diptera
- Family: Cecidomyiidae
- Genus: Rhopalomyia
- Species: R. floccosa

Binomial name
- Rhopalomyia floccosa (Felt, 1916)

Species of fly

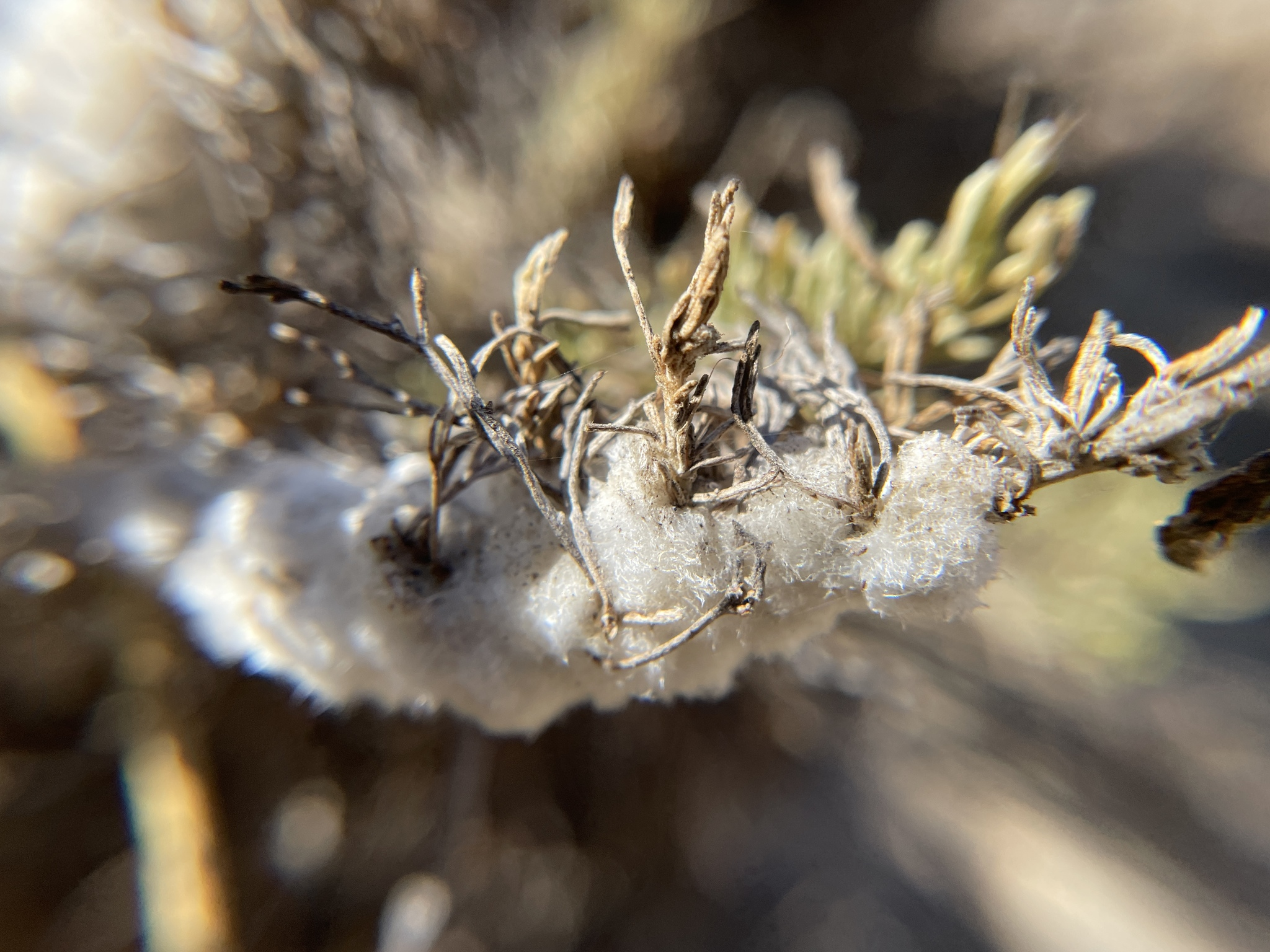
Rhopalomyia floccosa gall

Rhopalomyia floccosa, the sagebrush woolly stem gall midge, is a species of gall midges, insects in the family Cecidomyiidae. It induces galls on the host Artemisia californica, California sagebrush.

== Galls and biology ==
An individual gall measures 5 mm (0.20 in) in diameter. Coalescing galls may be 30–40 mm (1.18–1.57 in) in length. The midge produce white, wooly, monothalamous bud galls.
