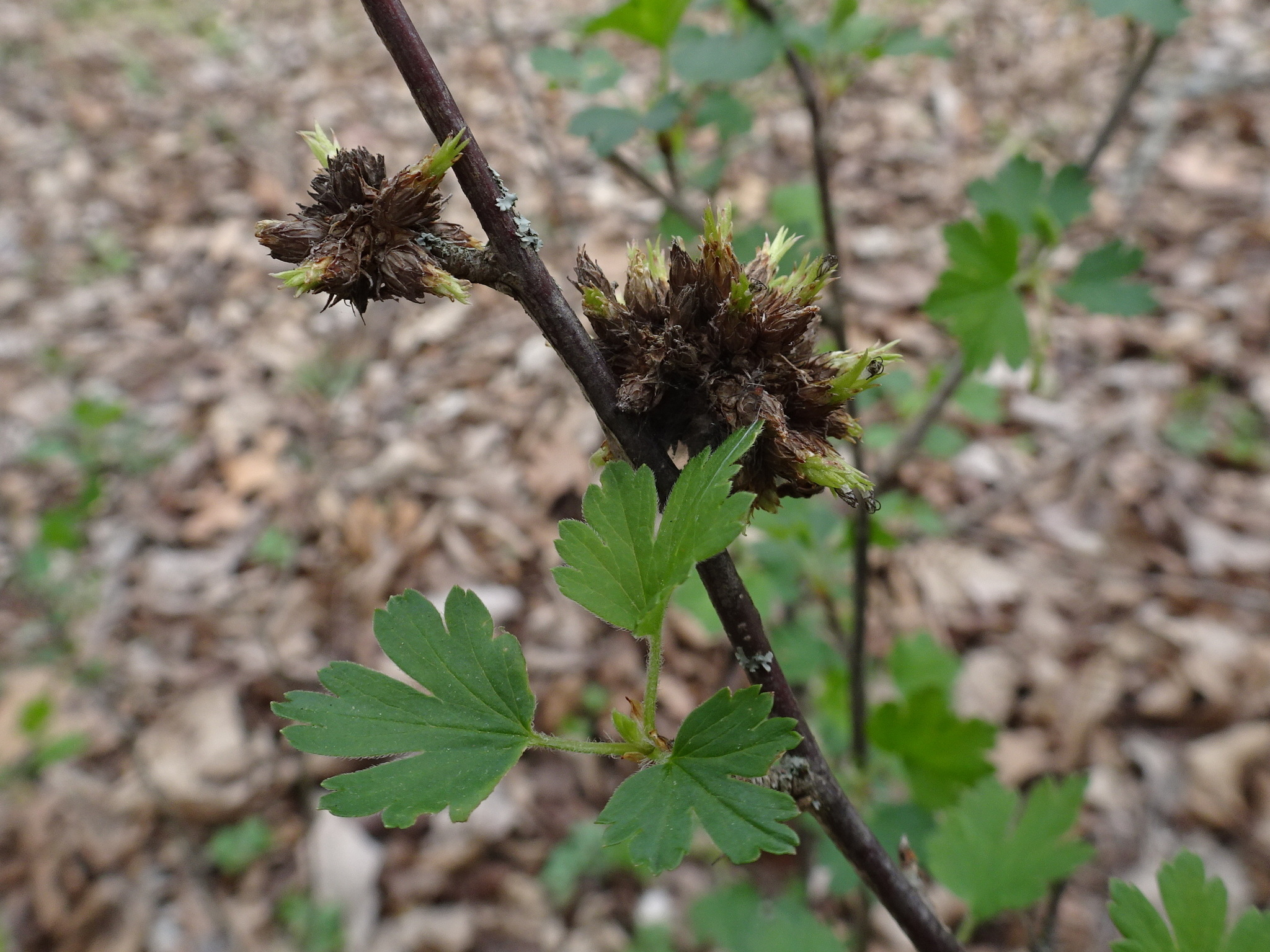
- Stem gall caused by gooseberry gall midge

Scientific classification
- Kingdom: Animalia
- Phylum: Arthropoda
- Class: Insecta
- Order: Diptera
- Family: Cecidomyiidae
- Genus: Rhopalomyia
- Species: R. grossulariae

Binomial name
- Rhopalomyia grossulariae Felt, 1911

= Rhopalomyia grossulariae =

Species of fly

Rhopalomyia grossulariae, the gooseberry gall midge, is a species of gall midge in the family Cecidomyiidae.
