= Sackenomyia commota =

Scientific classification
- Domain: Eukaryota
- Kingdom: Animalia
- Phylum: Arthropoda
- Class: Insecta
- Order: Diptera
- Family: Cecidomyiidae
- Genus: Sackenomyia
- Species: S. commota

Binomial name
- Sackenomyia commota Gagne, 1975

Synonyms
- Cystiphora viburnifolia Felt, 1911

Species of fly

Sackenomyia commota is a species of gall midges, insects in the family Cecidomyiidae.
