= Rhopalomyia astericaulis =

Scientific classification
- Kingdom: Animalia
- Phylum: Arthropoda
- Class: Insecta
- Order: Diptera
- Family: Cecidomyiidae
- Genus: Rhopalomyia
- Species: R. astericaulis

Binomial name
- Rhopalomyia astericaulis Felt, 1907

Species of fly

Rhopalomyia astericaulis is a species of gall midges, insects in the family Cecidomyiidae.
