= Rhopalomyia lateriflori =

Scientific classification
- Kingdom: Animalia
- Phylum: Arthropoda
- Class: Insecta
- Order: Diptera
- Family: Cecidomyiidae
- Genus: Rhopalomyia
- Species: R. lateriflori

Binomial name
- Rhopalomyia lateriflori Felt, 1908

Species of fly

Rhopalomyia lateriflori is a species of gall midge, insects in the family Cecidomyiidae.
