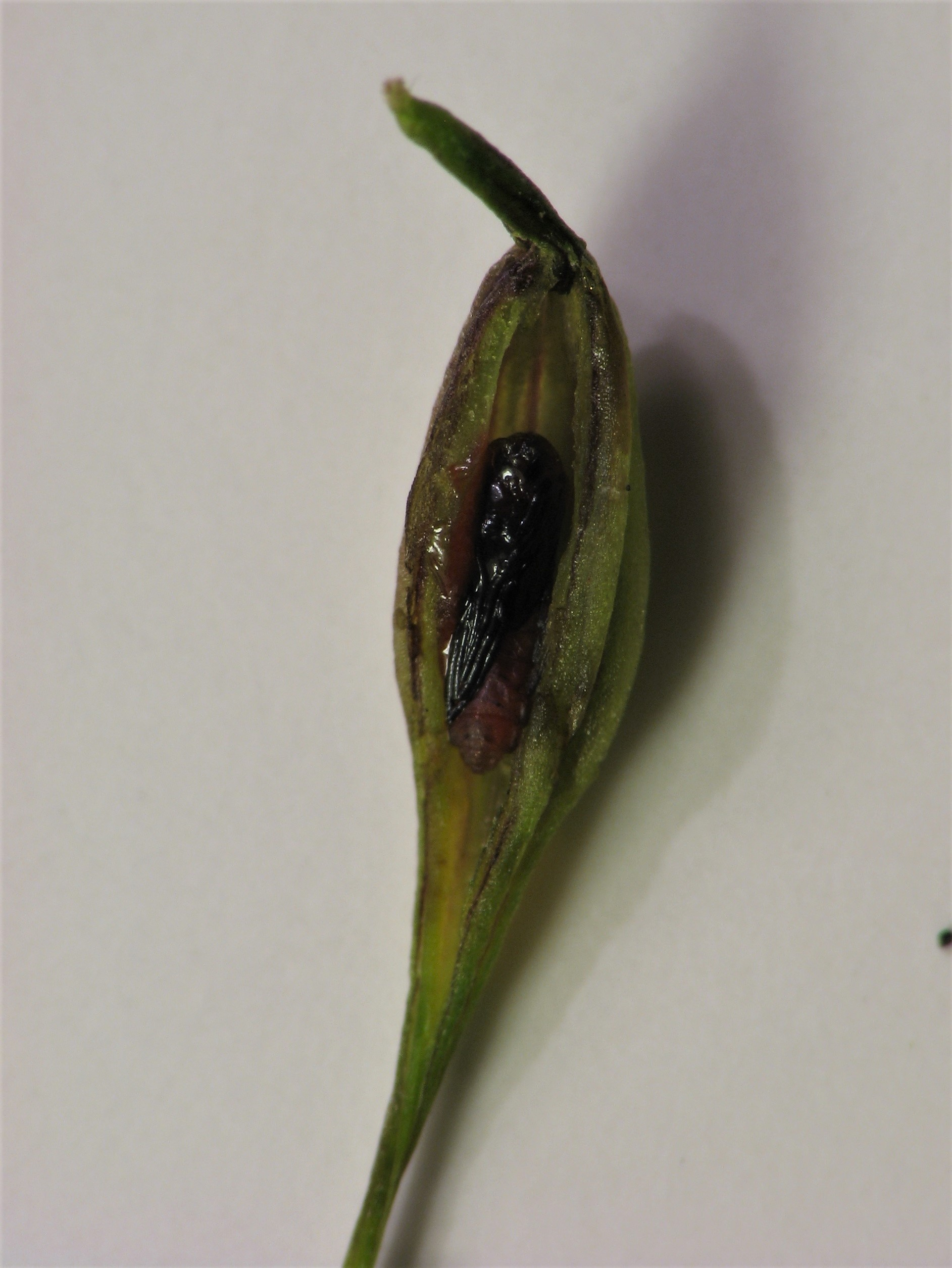
- Pupa in gall

Scientific classification
- Domain: Eukaryota
- Kingdom: Animalia
- Phylum: Arthropoda
- Class: Insecta
- Order: Diptera
- Family: Cecidomyiidae
- Genus: Rhopalomyia
- Species: R. pedicellata

Binomial name
- Rhopalomyia pedicellata Felt, 1908

Synonyms
- Cecidomyia euthamiae Stebbins, 1910

= Rhopalomyia pedicellata =

Species of fly

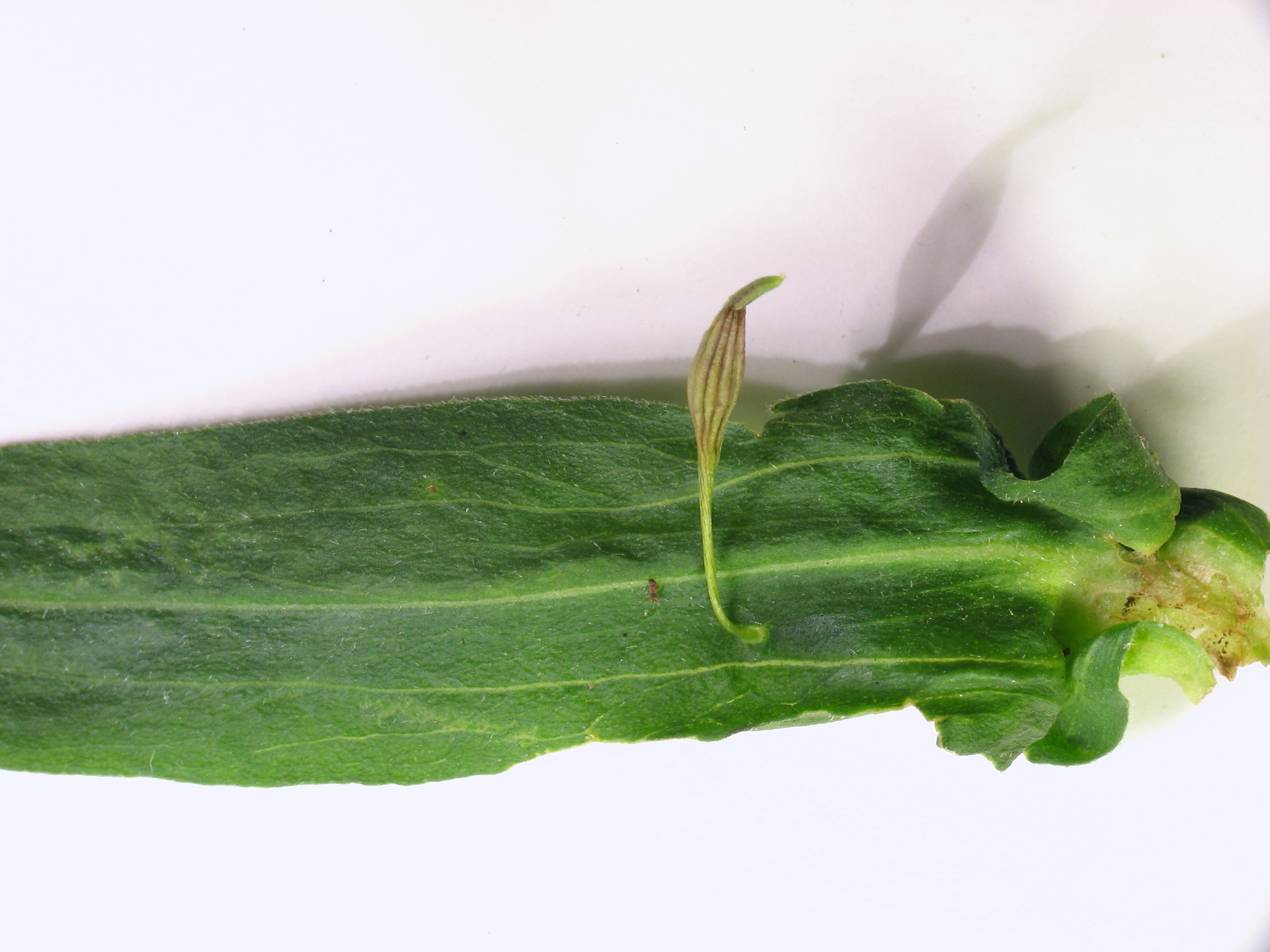
Gall on leaf of goldenrod (Euthamia graminifolia)

Rhopalomyia pedicellata is a species of gall midges, insects in the family Cecidomyiidae.
