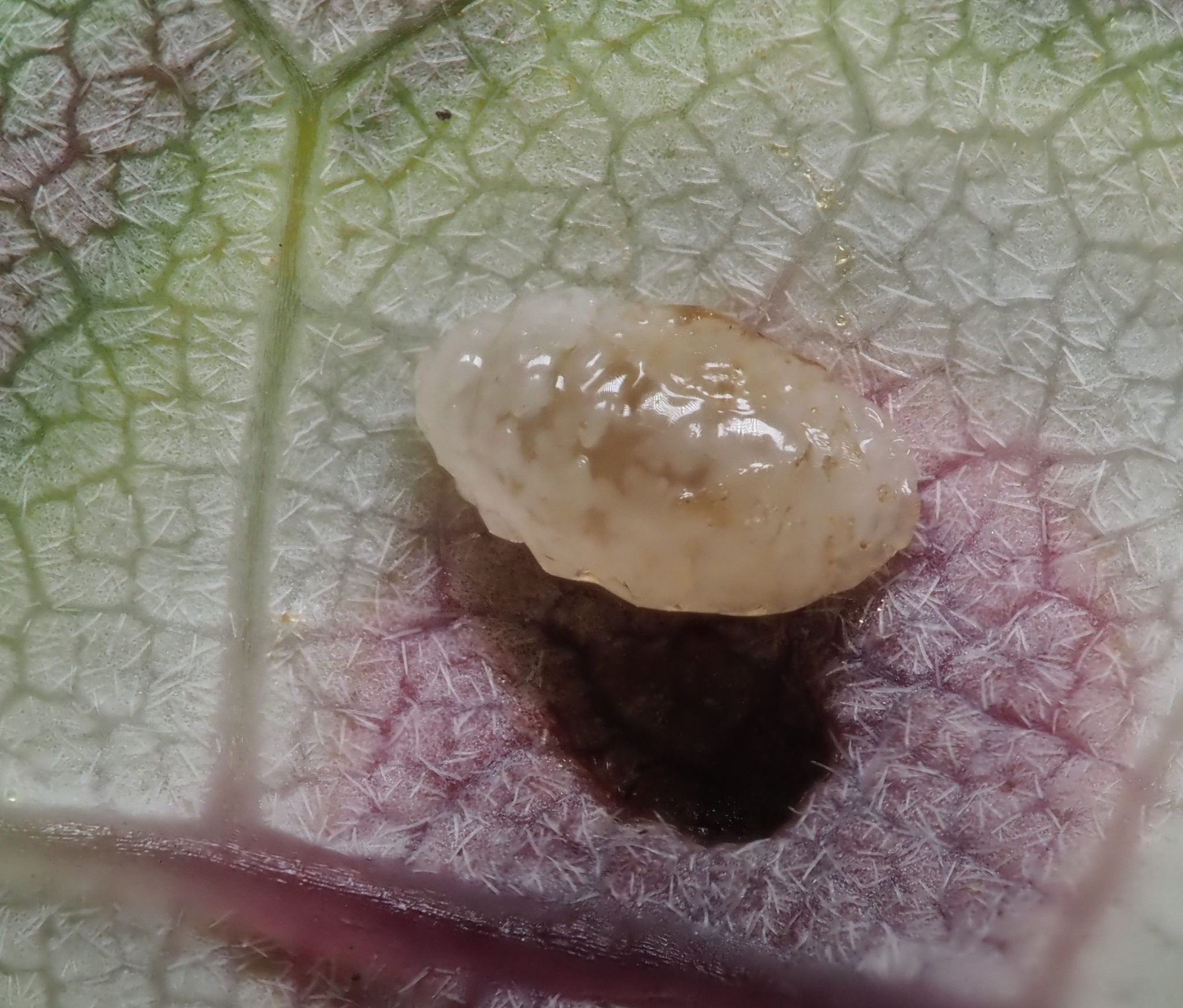

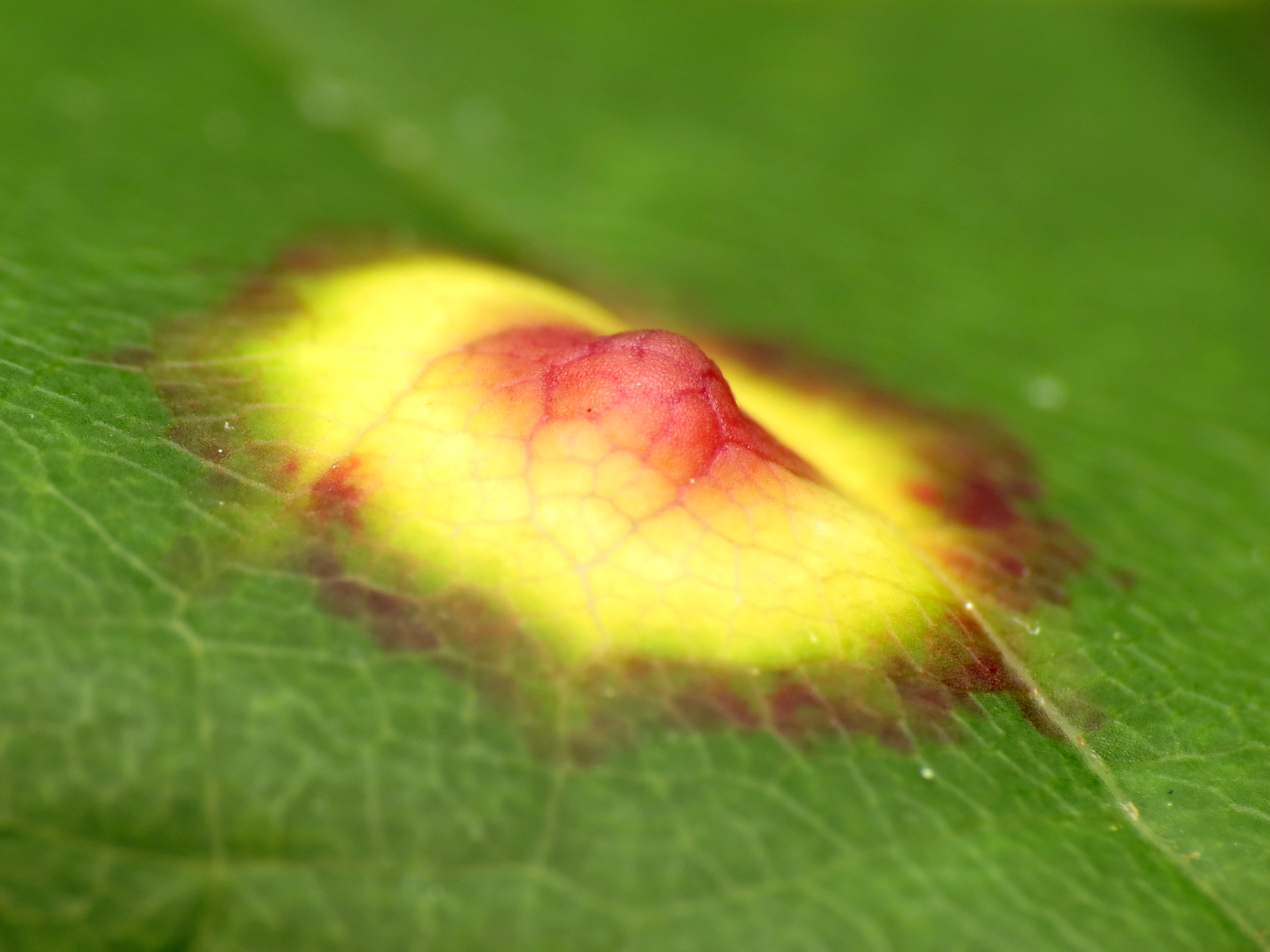
- Larva (top) and Leaf gall caused by Acericecis ocellaris (bottom)

Scientific classification
- Kingdom: Animalia
- Phylum: Arthropoda
- Class: Insecta
- Order: Diptera
- Family: Cecidomyiidae
- Genus: Acericecis
- Species: A. ocellaris

Binomial name
- Acericecis ocellaris (Osten Sacken, 1862)

Synonyms
- Cecidomyia ocellaris Osten Sacken, 1862; Mayetiola virginiana Felt, 1908

= Acericecis ocellaris =

Species of fly

Acericecis ocellaris, known generally as ocellate gall midge, is a species of gall midge in the family Cecidomyiidae. Other common names include the maple eyespot gall and maple leaf spot gall.

This species induces blister-like galls on the leaves of maples in the Nearctic, including Acer circinatum, A. pensylvanicum, A. rubrum, A. saccharinum, A. saccharum, and A. spicatum.

The species was first described by Carl Robert Osten-Sacken in 1862 as Cecidomyia ocellaris. It is the type species of the genus.
