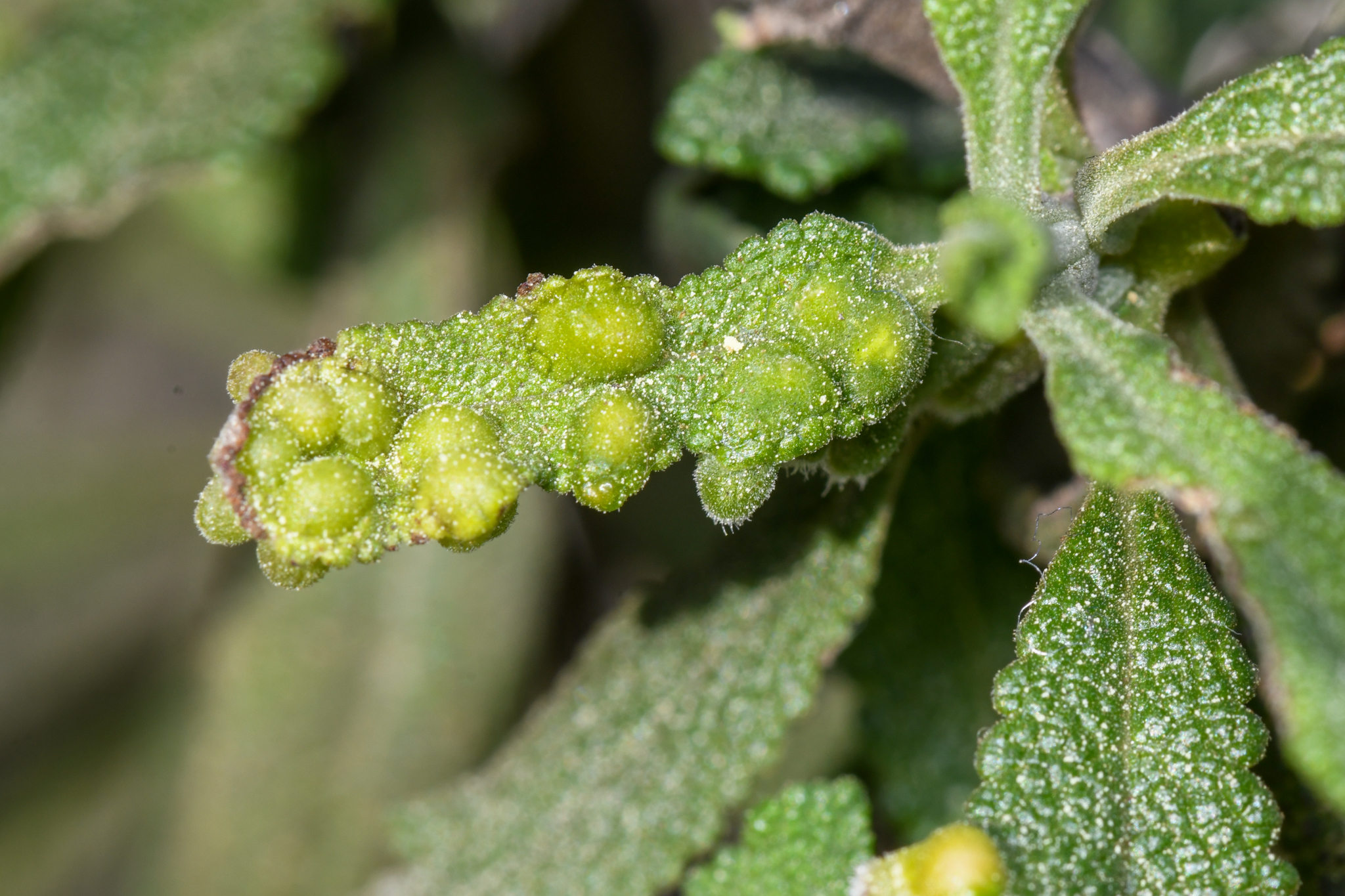
- Leaf galls caused by Rhopalomyia audibertiae

Scientific classification
- Kingdom: Animalia
- Phylum: Arthropoda
- Class: Insecta
- Order: Diptera
- Family: Cecidomyiidae
- Genus: Rhopalomyia
- Species: R. audibertiae

Binomial name
- Rhopalomyia audibertiae Felt, 1907

= Rhopalomyia audibertiae =

Sage leaf gall midge

Species of fly

Rhopalomyia audibertiae, the sage leaf gall midge, is a species of gall midges, insects in the family Cecidomyiidae.
