= Rhopalomyia strobiligemma =

Scientific classification
- Domain: Eukaryota
- Kingdom: Animalia
- Phylum: Arthropoda
- Class: Insecta
- Order: Diptera
- Family: Cecidomyiidae
- Genus: Rhopalomyia
- Species: R. strobiligemma

Binomial name
- Rhopalomyia strobiligemma Stebbins, 1910

Synonyms
- Cecidomyia strobiligemma Stebbins, 1910

Species of fly

Rhopalomyia strobiligemma is a species of gall midge, insects in the family Cecidomyiidae.
