= Rhopalomyia ericameriae =

Scientific classification
- Domain: Eukaryota
- Kingdom: Animalia
- Phylum: Arthropoda
- Class: Insecta
- Order: Diptera
- Family: Cecidomyiidae
- Genus: Rhopalomyia
- Species: R. ericameriae

Binomial name
- Rhopalomyia ericameriae Felt, 1916

Species of fly

Rhopalomyia ericameriae is a species of gall midges, insects in the family Cecidomyiidae.
