= Rhopalomyia chrysothamni =

Scientific classification
- Domain: Eukaryota
- Kingdom: Animalia
- Phylum: Arthropoda
- Class: Insecta
- Order: Diptera
- Family: Cecidomyiidae
- Genus: Rhopalomyia
- Species: R. chrysothamni

Binomial name
- Rhopalomyia chrysothamni Felt, 1916

Species of fly

Rhopalomyia chrysothamni is a species of gall midges, insects in the family Cecidomyiidae. The midge causes very small, conical-tubular stem galls on rubber rabbitbrush [Ericameria nauseosa].
