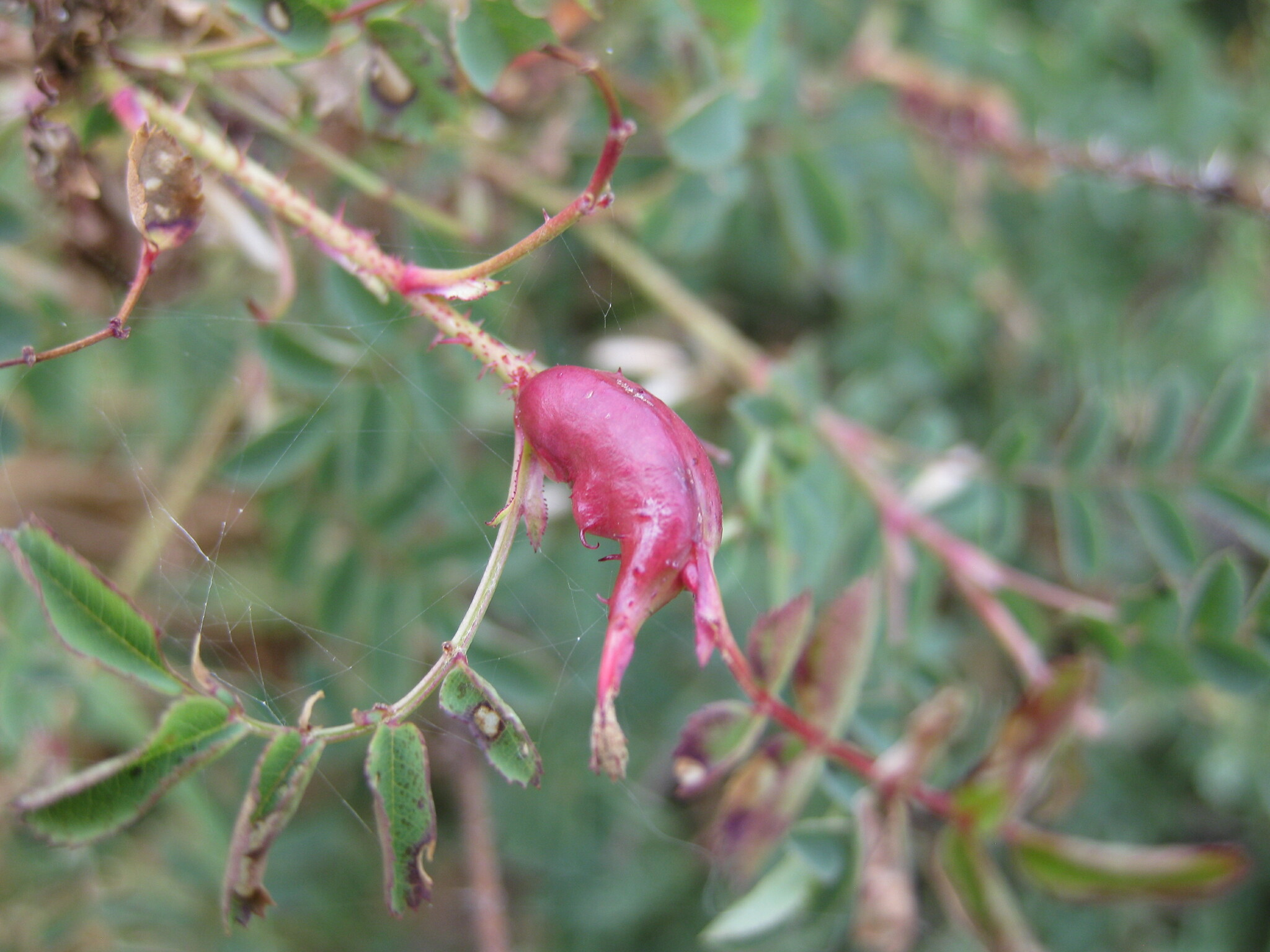
- Gall of Janetiella frankumi on a rose stem

Scientific classification
- Kingdom: Animalia
- Phylum: Arthropoda
- Class: Insecta
- Order: Diptera
- Family: Cecidomyiidae
- Supertribe: Lasiopteridi
- Genus: Janetiella; Kieffer, 1898

= Janetiella =

Genus of flies

Janetiella is a genus of gall midges in the family Cecidomyiidae. There are at least thirty described species.

== Species ==
These 33 species belong to the genus Janetiella:

- Janetiella acerifolii (Felt, 1907)^{i c g}
- Janetiella acuticauda Kieffer & Herbst, 1906^{c g}
- Janetiella americana Felt, 1908^{i c g}
- Janetiella asplenifolia (Felt, 1907)^{i c g}
- Janetiella breviaria Felt, 1908^{i c g}
- Janetiella brevicauda Felt, 1908^{i c g}
- Janetiella brevicornis (Felt, 1907)^{i g}
- Janetiella castaneae (Felt, 1909)^{i g}
- Janetiella coloradensis Felt, 1912^{i c g}
- Janetiella euphorbiae Stefani, 1908^{c g}
- Janetiella fallax Kieffer, 1904^{c g}
- Janetiella foliicola Marikovskij, 1956^{c g}
- Janetiella fortiana Trotter, 1901^{c g}
- Janetiella frankumi Harris, 2003^{c g}
- Janetiella genistae Kieffer, 1909^{c g}
- Janetiella glechomae Tavares, 1930^{c g}
- Janetiella goiranica Kieffer & Trotter, 1905^{c g}
- Janetiella infrafoli Monzen, 1955^{c g}
- Janetiella inquilina Felt, 1908^{i}
- Janetiella inquilinus (Felt, 1908)^{c g}
- Janetiella kimurai Inouye, 1964^{c g}
- Janetiella lemeei (Kieffer, 1904)^{c g}
- Janetiella ligni Felt, 1915^{i}
- Janetiella maculata Tavares, 1901^{c g}
- Janetiella montivaga Kieffer & Jörgensen, 1910^{c g}
- Janetiella oenephila (Haimhoffen, 1875)^{c g}
- Janetiella salicicorniae Fedotova, 1984^{c g}
- Janetiella sanguinea Felt, 1908^{i c g}
- Janetiella siskiyou Felt, 1917^{i c g}
- Janetiella thymi (Kieffer, 1888)^{c g}
- Janetiella tiliacea (Felt, 1907)^{i c g}
- Janetiella tuberculi (Rübsaamen, 1889)^{c g}
- Janetiella ulmii (Beutenmuller, 1907)^{i c g b}

Data sources: i = ITIS, c = Catalogue of Life, g = GBIF, b = Bugguide.net
