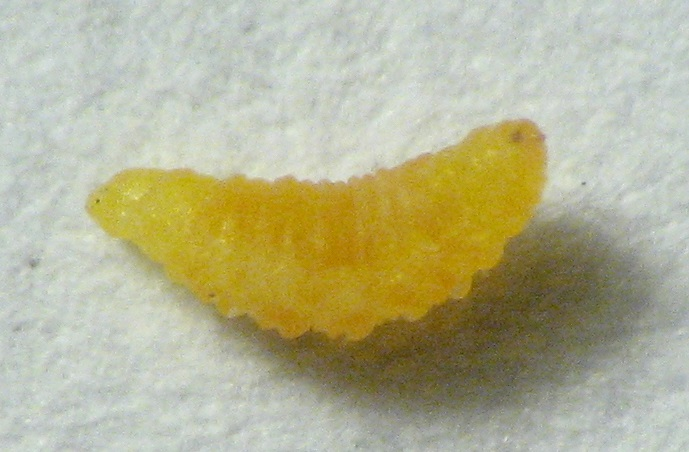
- Dasineura carbonaria, larva

Scientific classification
- Domain: Eukaryota
- Kingdom: Animalia
- Phylum: Arthropoda
- Class: Insecta
- Order: Diptera
- Family: Cecidomyiidae
- Subfamily: Cecidomyiinae
- Supertribe: Lasiopteridi
- Tribe: Oligotrophini

= Oligotrophini =

Tribe of flies

Oligotrophini is a tribe of gall midges, insects in the family Cecidomyiidae. There are at least 300 described species in Oligotrophini.

== Genera ==
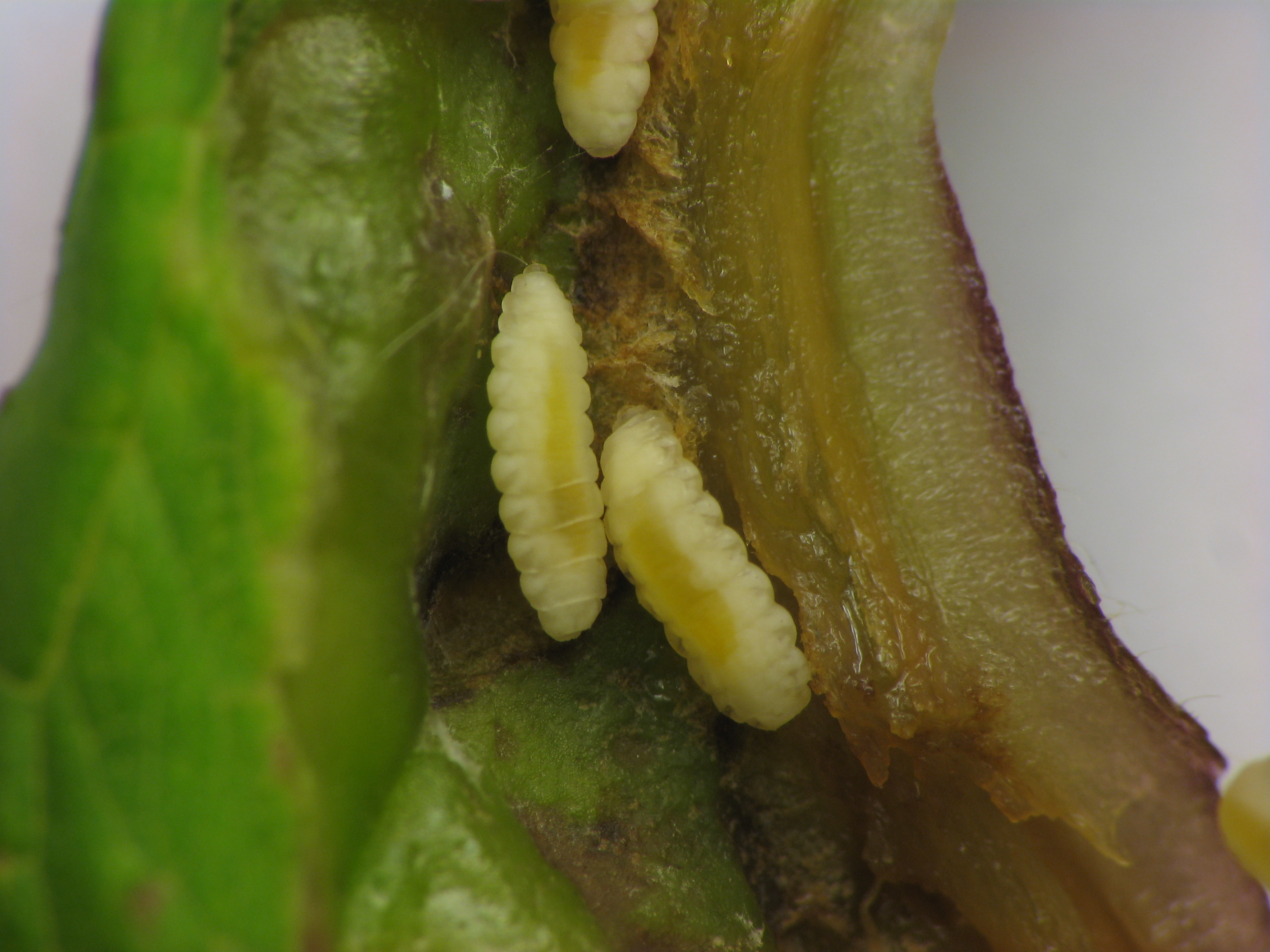
Dasineura tumidosae, larvae

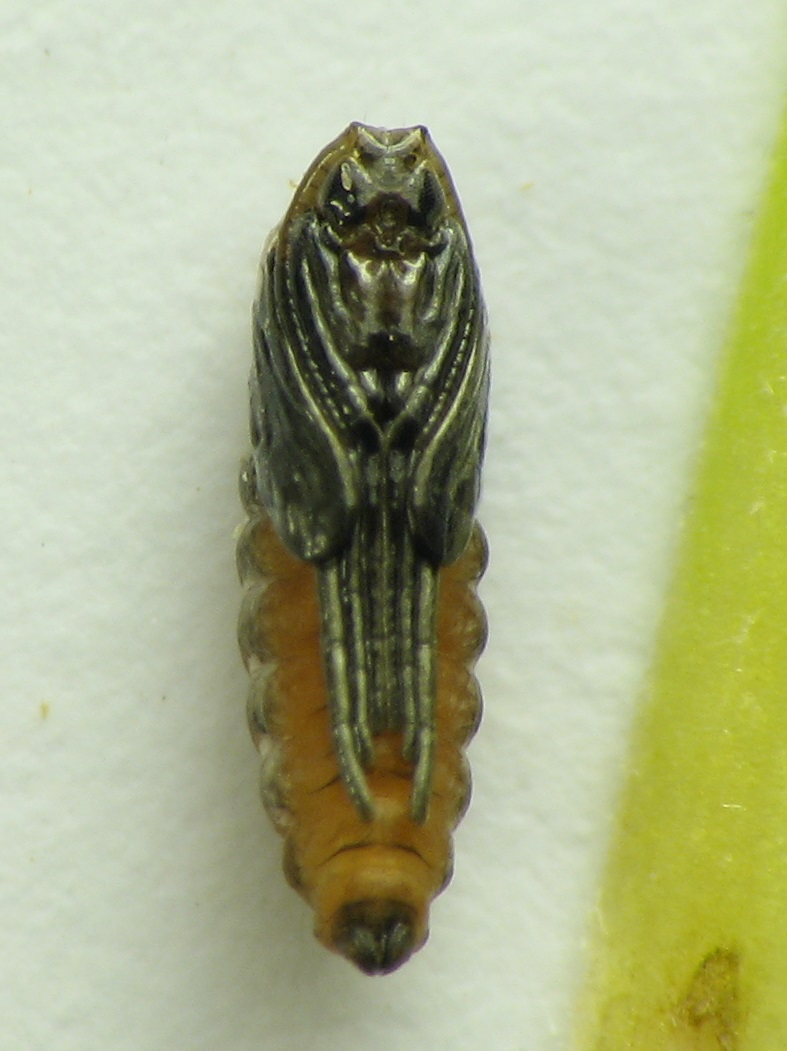
Rhopalomyia solidaginis, pupa

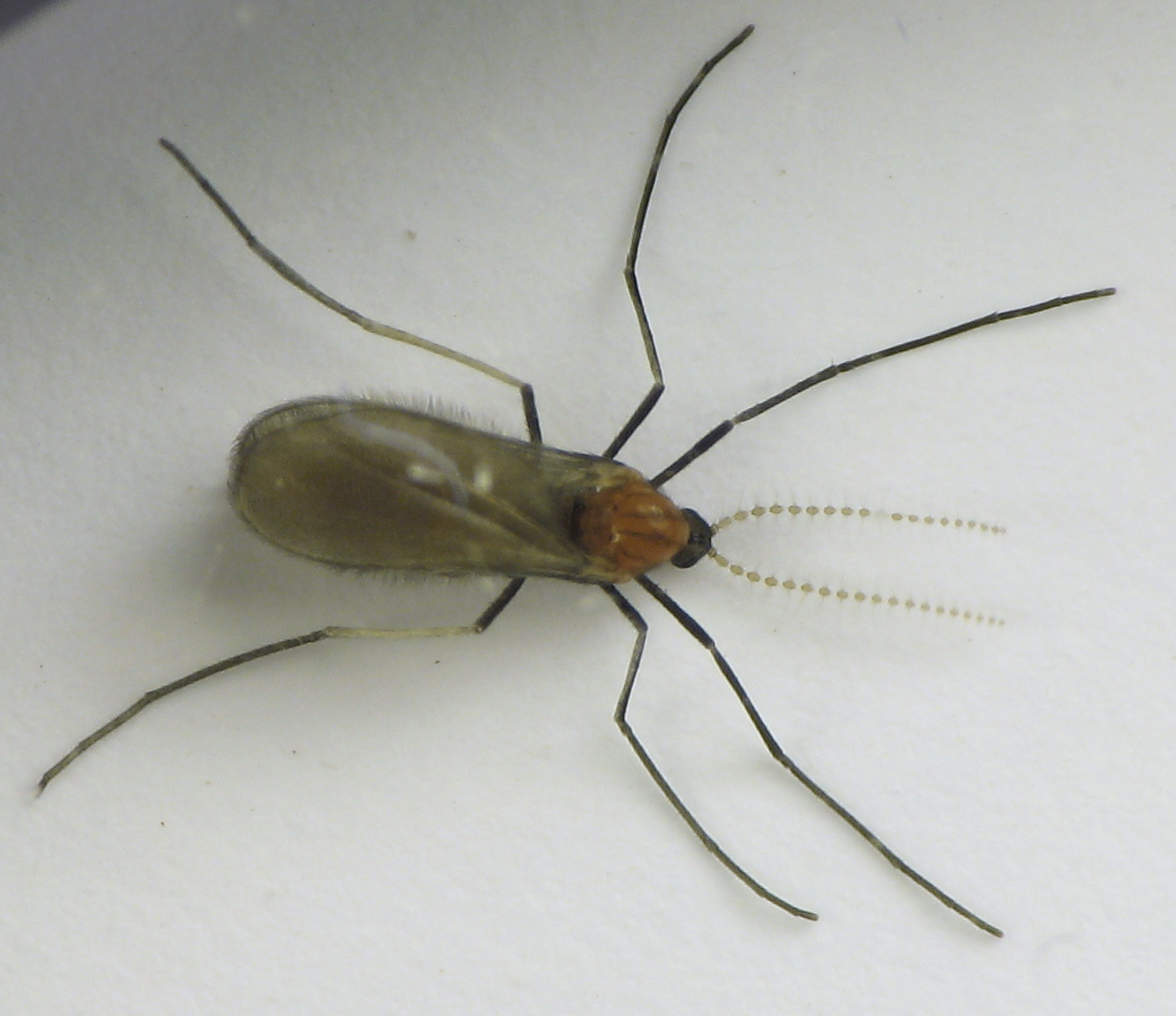
Rhopalomyia solidaginis adult

The following genera belong to the tribe Oligotrophini:

1. Acericecis Gagné, 1983
2. Amerhapha Rübsaamen, 1914
3. Arceuthomyia Kieffer, 1913
4. Arnoldiola Strand, 1926
5. Bayeriola Gagné, 1991
6. Blastomyia Kieffer, 1913
7. Bremiola Rübsaamen, 1915
8. Celticecis Gagné, 1983 (hackberry gall midges)
9. Craneiobia Kieffer, 1913
10. Cystiphora Kieffer, 1892
11. Dasineura Rondani, 1840
12. Didymomyia Rübsaamen, 1912
13. Fabomyia Fedotova, 1991
14. Geocrypta Kieffer, 1913
15. Gephyraulus Rübsaamen, 1915
16. Giraudiella Rübsaamen, 1915
17. Hartigiola Rübsaamen, 1912
18. Iteomyia Kieffer, 1913
19. Jaapiella Rübsaamen, 1915
20. Janetiella Kieffer, 1898
21. Kaltenbachiola Hedicke, 1938
22. Lathyromyza Rübsaamen, 1915
23. Macrolabis Kieffer, 1892
24. Mayetiola Kieffer, 1896
25. Mikomya Kieffer, 1912
26. Misospatha Kieffer, 1913
27. Neomikiella Hedicke, 1938
28. Oligotrophus Latreille, 1805
29. Pemphigocecis Rübsaamen, 1915
30. Phegomyia Kieffer, 1913
31. Physemocecis Rübsaamen, 1914
32. Psectrosema Kieffer, 1904
33. Rabdophaga Westwood, 1847
34. Rhopalomyia Rübsaamen, 1892
35. Rondaniola Rübsaamen & Hedicke, 1938
36. Sackenomyia Felt, 1908
37. Schmidtiella Rübsaamen, 1914
38. Semudobia Kieffer, 1913
39. Spurgia Gagné, 1990
40. Taxomyia Rübsaamen, 1912
41. Trotteria Kieffer, 1901
42. Wachtliella Rübsaamen, 1915
43. Zygiobia Kieffer, 1913
