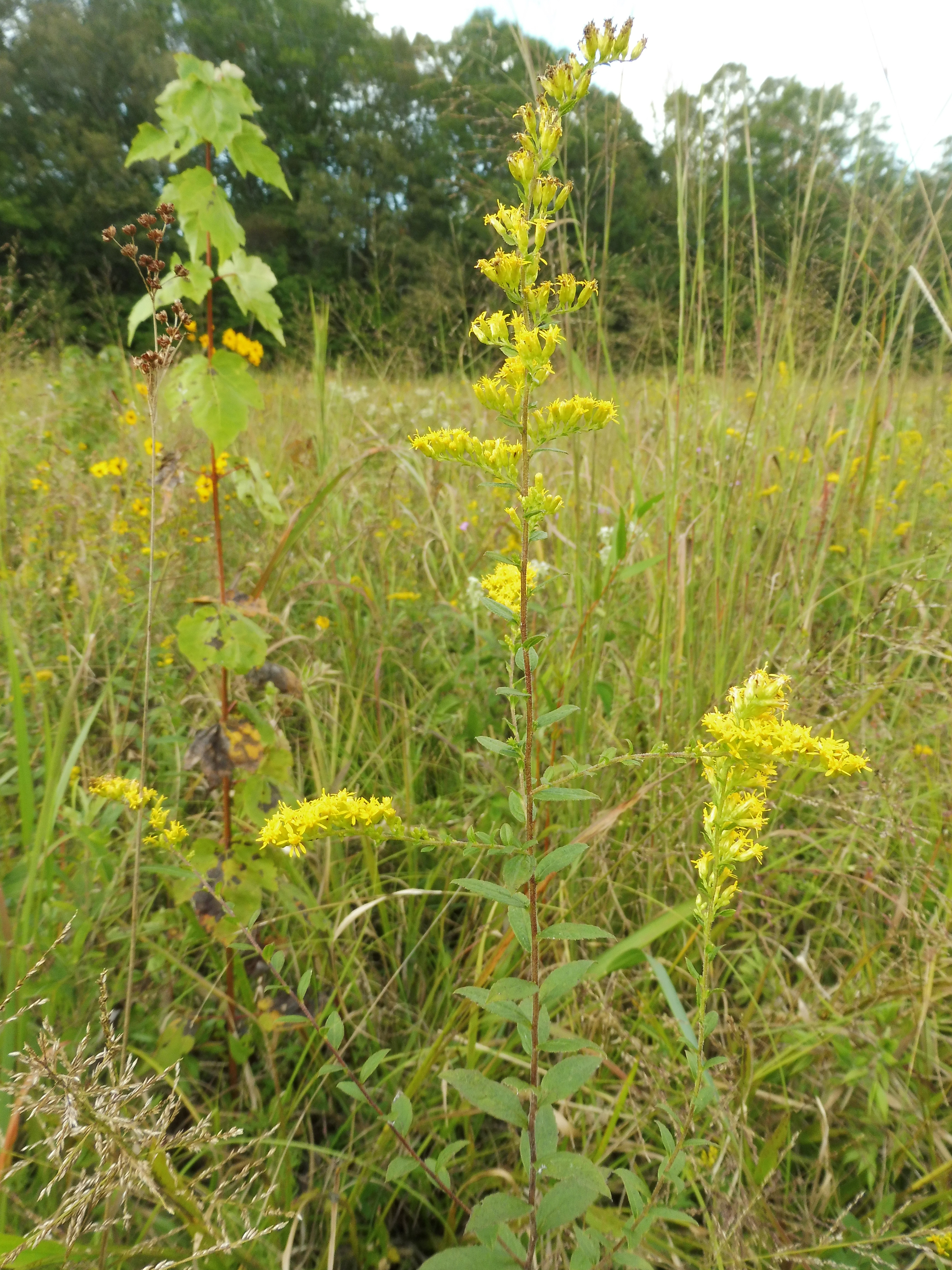
- variety aspera

Scientific classification
- Kingdom: Plantae
- Clade: Tracheophytes
- Clade: Angiosperms
- Clade: Eudicots
- Clade: Asterids
- Order: Asterales
- Family: Asteraceae
- Genus: Solidago
- Species: S. rugosa

Binomial name
- Solidago rugosa Mill. 1768

Synonyms
- Aster archerianus Kuntze; Aster rugosus (Mill.) Kuntze; Solidago aestivalis E. P. Bicknell, syn of var. sphagnophila; Solidago aspera Aiton, syn of var. aspera; Solidago celtidifolia Small, syn of var. celtidifolia

= Solidago rugosa =

Species of flowering plant

Solidago rugosa, commonly called the wrinkleleaf goldenrod or rough-stemmed goldenrod, is a species of flowering plant in the family Asteraceae. It is native to North America, where it is widespread across eastern and central Canada (from Newfoundland to Ontario) and the eastern and central United States (Maine west as far as Wisconsin and Iowa, south to Florida and Texas). It is usually found in wet to mesic habitats.

== Description ==
Solidago rugosa is a rough-leaved herbaceous perennial up to 2 m (6.6 ft) tall. Its leaves are primarily cauline. One plant can produce as many as 50 stems, each with 50–1500 yellow flower heads. It flowers in late summer through fall. It can be distinguished from the similar-looking Solidago ulmifolia by the presence of creeping rhizomes, and by its more abrupt leaf bases.

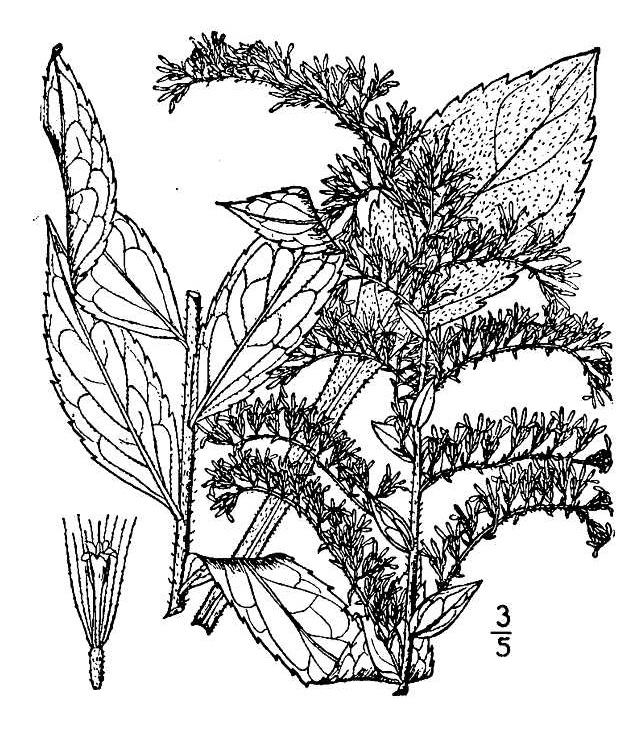
1913 illustration

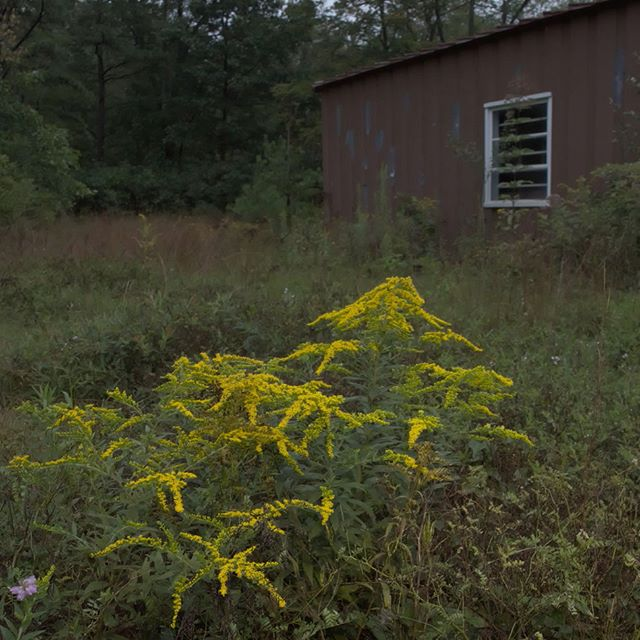
Growing in a ruderal habitat

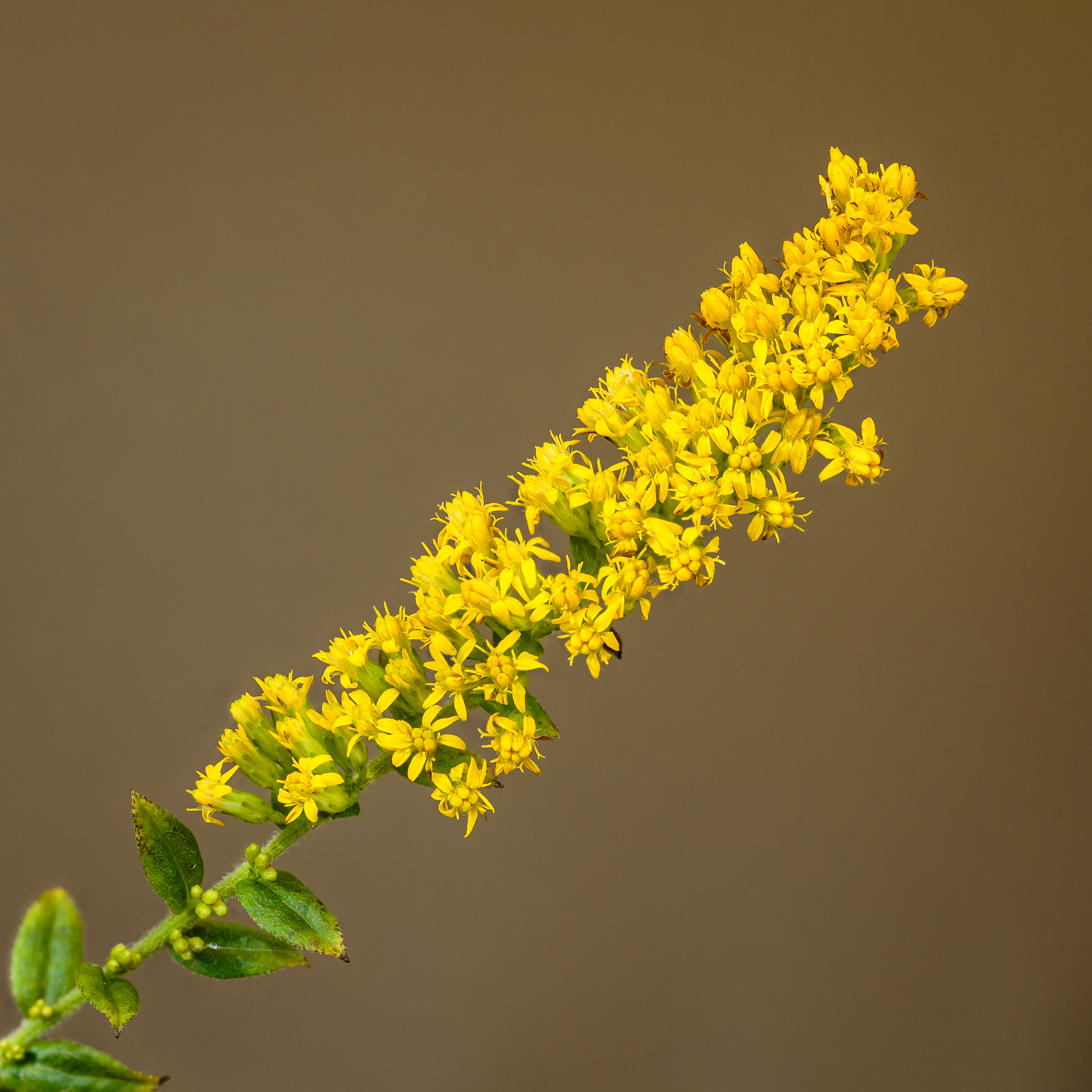
A stalk of flowers.

== Galls ==
This species is host to the following insect induced galls:

- Asphondylia rosulata Dorchin, 2015 (bud and leaf snap)
- Asteromyia carbonifera (Osten Sacken, 1862)
- Asteromyia tumifica (Beutenmuller, 1907)
- Dasineura folliculi (Felt, 1908)
- Eurosta comma (Wiedemann, 1830)
- Eurosta solidaginis (Fitch, 1855)
- Eutreta novaeboracensis (Fitch, 1855)
- Gnorimoschema gallaesolidaginis (Fitch, 1855)
- Procecidochares atra (Loew, 1862) (spring summer and autumn generations)
- Rhopalomyia clarkei Felt, 1907
- Rhopalomyia solidaginis (Loew, 1862) (spring summer and autumn generations)
- Calycomyza solidaginis Kaltenbach, 1869

external link to gallformers

== Taxonomy ==
Solidago rugosa is a variable plant throughout its range. Five varieties are currently recognized, although their relationships are complex and poorly understood. The varieties are:

- Solidago rugosa var. aspera (Aiton) Fernald - common throughout the east
- Solidago rugosa var. celtidifolia (Small) Fernald - coastal plain from Texas to Virginia
- Solidago rugosa var. cronquistiana Semple - high elevations in Georgia, Tennessee, North Carolina
- Solidago rugosa var. rugosa - common, generally more northern and Appalachian
- Solidago rugosa var. sphagnophila C. Graves - cedar swamps from Nova Scotia to coastal Virginia

== Conservation ==
Solidago rugosa is common throughout most of its range, and is not tracked at the species level in any state or province it is native to. However, in Connecticut the variety sphagnophila is listed as a special concern and believed to be extirpated from the state.

== Cultivation ==
Solidago rugosa is grown as an ornamental garden plant. The cultivar 'Fireworks' has gained the Royal Horticultural Society's Award of Garden Merit.

== Native American ethnobotany ==
The Haudenosaunee use the whole plant for biliousness and as liver medicine, and take a decoction of flowers and leaves for dizziness, weakness or sunstroke.
