= Sackenomyia =

Scientific classification
- Domain: Eukaryota
- Kingdom: Animalia
- Phylum: Arthropoda
- Class: Insecta
- Order: Diptera
- Family: Cecidomyiidae
- Supertribe: Lasiopteridi
- Genus: Sackenomyia; Felt, 1908

Genus of flies

Sackenomyia is a genus of gall midges, insects in the family Cecidomyiidae. There are about five described species in Sackenomyia.

== Species ==
These five species belong to the genus Sackenomyia:

- Sackenomyia acerifoliae (Felt, 1907)^{i c g}
- Sackenomyia commota Gagne, 1975^{i c g b}
- Sackenomyia reaumurii (Bremi, 1847)^{c g}
- Sackenomyia ribesifolia Fedotova, 1987^{c g}
- Sackenomyia viburnifolia Felt, 1909^{i}

Data sources: i = ITIS, c = Catalogue of Life, g = GBIF, b = Bugguide.net
