= Hans Hedicke =

German entomologist (1891–1949)

- Born: 21 August 1891; Magdeburg, Kingdom of Prussia
- Died: 9 March 1949 (aged 57); Berlin, Germany

Academic work
- Discipline: Entomology
- Institutions: Prussian Academy of Sciences

Hans Franz Paul Hedicke (21 August 1891 – 9 March 1949) was a German entomologist.

== Background ==
Hedicke was born in Magdeburg, Kingdom of Prussia in 1891. From 1923 to 1945 he was a lecturer at the Prussian Academy of Sciences. Hedicke was an editor of the Journal Deutsche Entomologische Zeitschrift from 1921 to 1930. He edited an exsiccata-like series called Herbarium tierischer Frasstücke. Hedicke died in Berlin in 1949.
