= Craneiobia =

Scientific classification
- Domain: Eukaryota
- Kingdom: Animalia
- Phylum: Arthropoda
- Class: Insecta
- Order: Diptera
- Family: Cecidomyiidae
- Supertribe: Lasiopteridi
- Genus: Craneiobia; Kieffer, 1913

Genus of flies

Craneiobia is a genus of gall midges in the family Cecidomyiidae. There are at least two described species in Craneiobia. They create tube-like galls on leaves of Cornus plants.

== Species ==
These two species belong to the genus Craneiobia:

- Craneiobia corni (Giraud, 1863)^{c g}
- Craneiobia tuba (Stebbins, 1910)^{i b}

Data sources: i = ITIS, c = Catalogue of Life, g = GBIF, b = Bugguide.net
