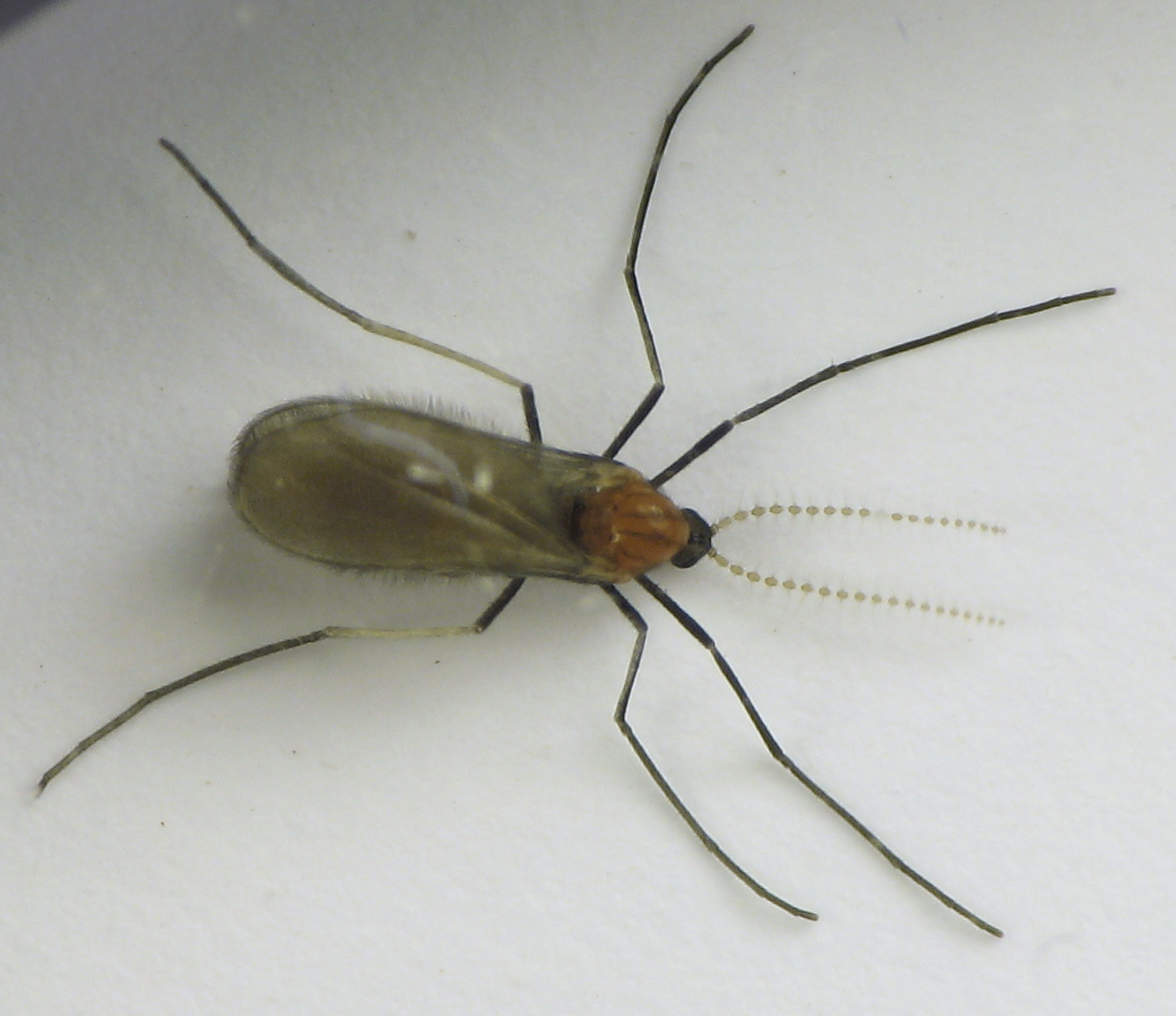
- Male
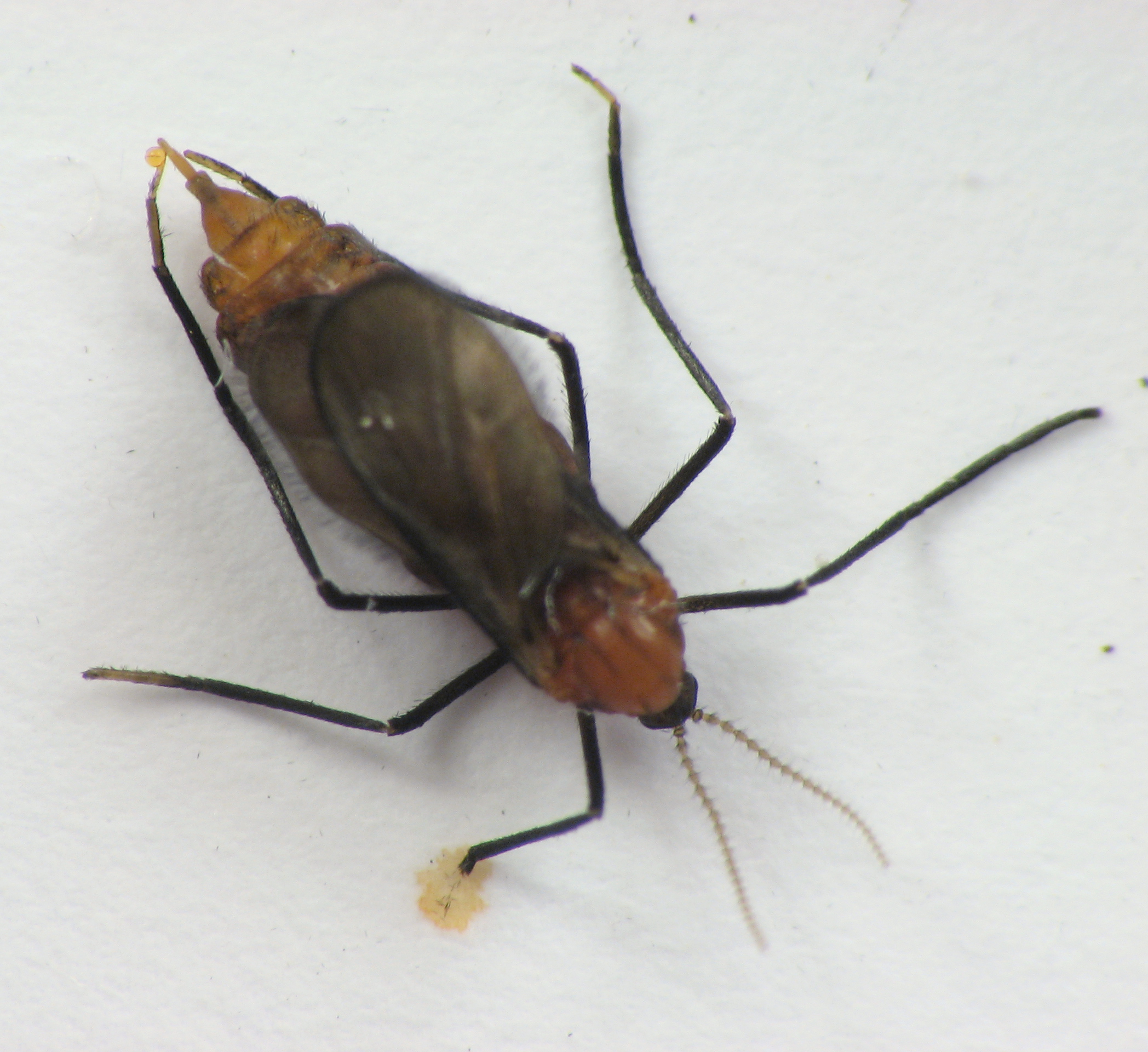
- Female

Scientific classification
- Kingdom: Animalia
- Phylum: Arthropoda
- Clade: Pancrustacea
- Class: Insecta
- Order: Diptera
- Family: Cecidomyiidae
- Genus: Rhopalomyia
- Species: R. solidaginis

Binomial name
- Rhopalomyia solidaginis (Loew, 1862)

Synonyms
- Cecidomyia solidaginis Loew, 1862; Rhopalomyia albipennis Felt, 1908; Rhopalomyia carolina Felt, 1908

= Rhopalomyia solidaginis =

Species of fly

Rhopalomyia solidaginis, the goldenrod bunch gall, is a species of gall midges, insects in the family Cecidomyiidae. The galls of this species have the following host species of goldenrods: Solidago altissima, Solidago canadensis, and Solidago rugosa. They have been found across eastern North America.

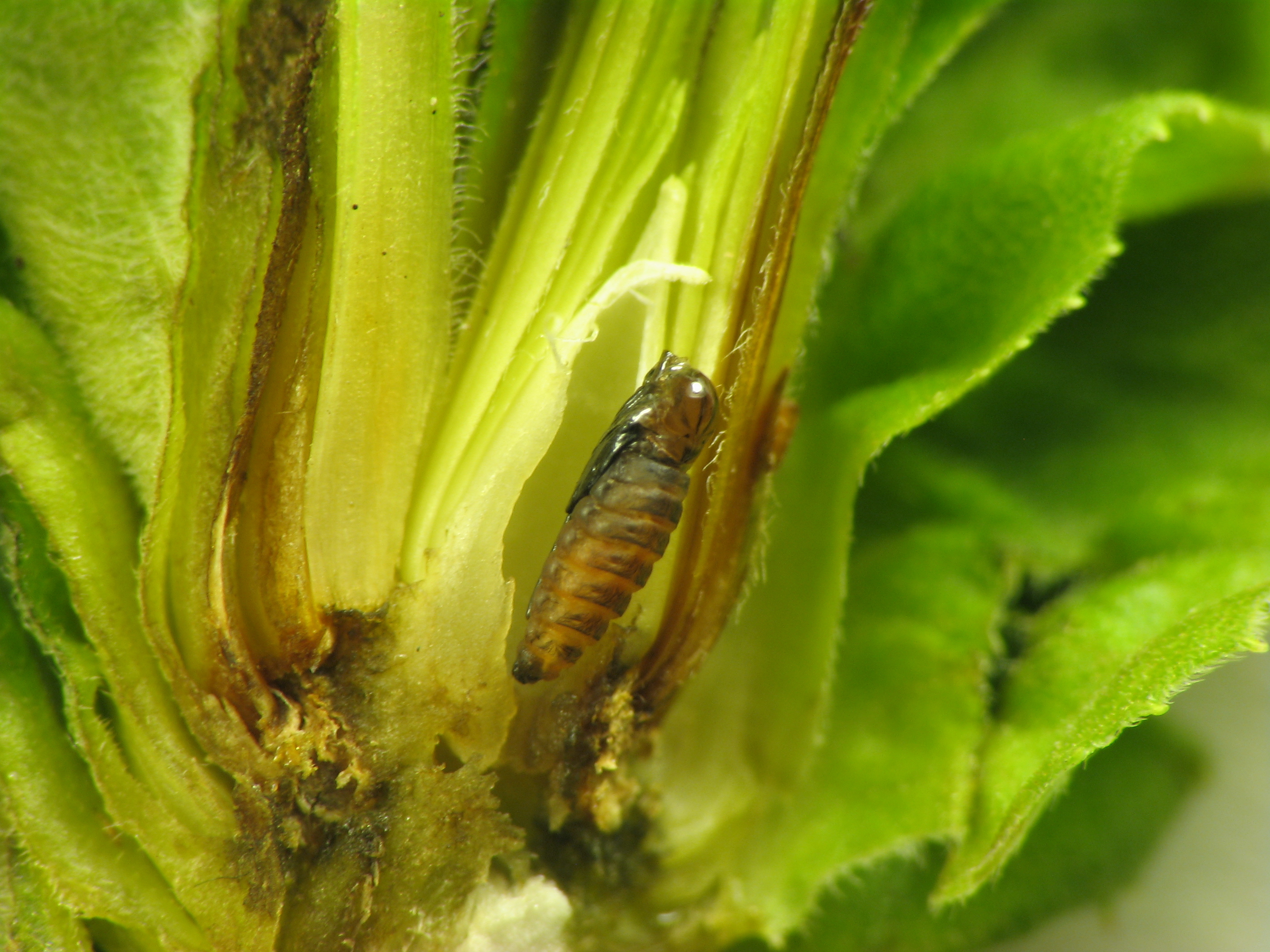
Rhopalomyia solidaginis pupa in bunch gall in Solidago

== Gall and biology ==
This species is bivoltine and induces different bud galls in the spring and summer on three different host plants. The spring galls are small and difficult to locate. Galled plants are sometimes stunted. Each gall typically contains only one chamber in the middle of the apical meristem and contains a single larva. Occasionally 2-3 chambers are found in the same gall and may be attached to each other longitudinally.

For the summer galls there are white chambers that are similar to those in the spring galls appear in mid-July. Each chamber contains a single larva that faces downwards and is surrounded by a group of short and narrow leaves, which are in turn surrounded by longer and wider leaves that form a distinct subunit within the gall. Typically, 2-5 subunits are clumped together at the shoot apex to form a rosette gall that is 3–5 cm in diameter.

This is the second largest species of Rhopalomyia on goldenrods. Males can be recognized by their large gonocoxite segment of the gonopods, and females have the short ovipositors, similar to Rhopalomyia capitata, but are distinguishable by the shape of the eighth abdominal tergite. Adults of the spring generation are somewhat smaller and have fewer antennal flagellomeres than adults of the summer generation, but adults and pupae of the two generations are otherwise similar morphologically.

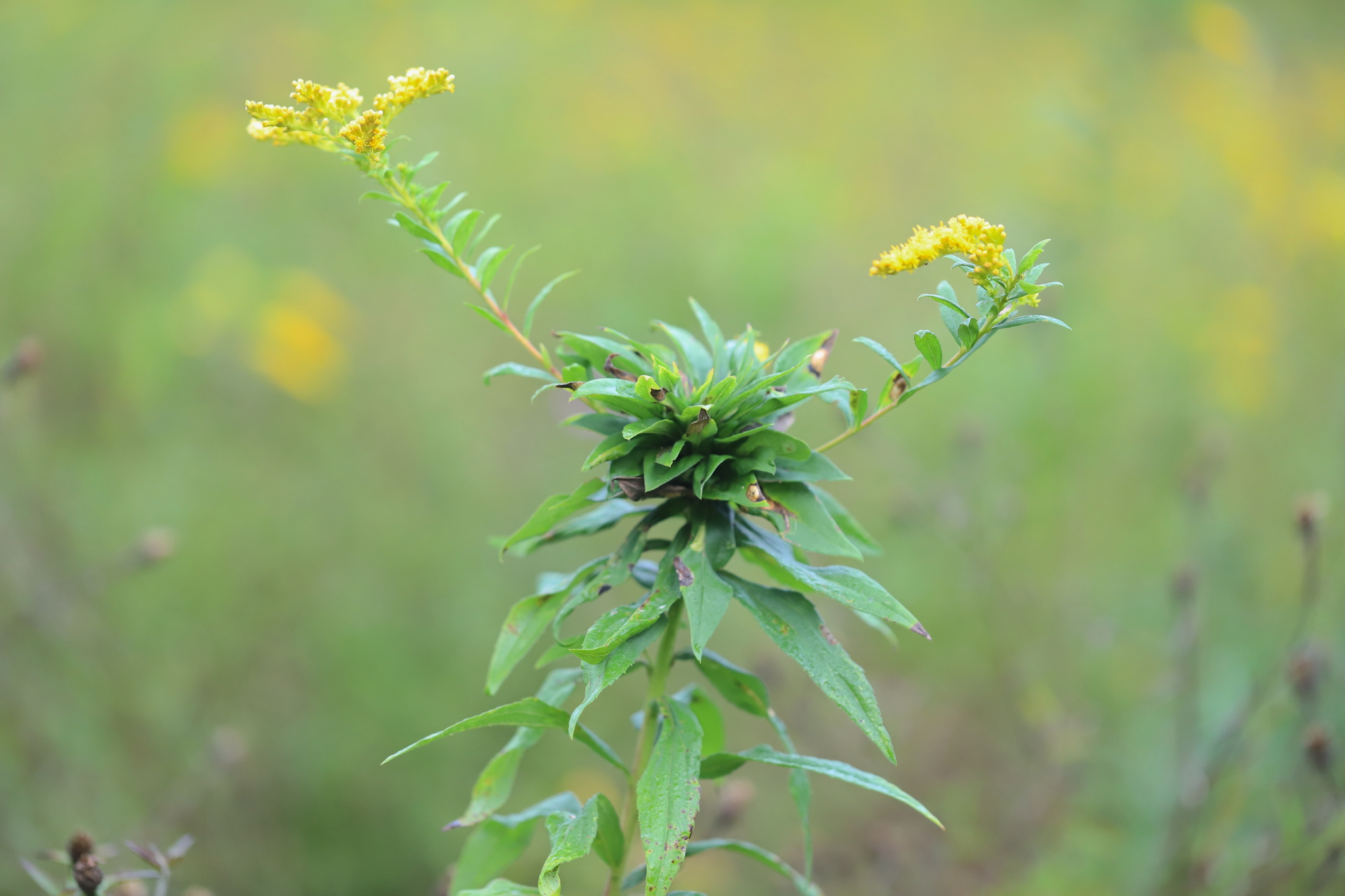
R. solidaginis gall
