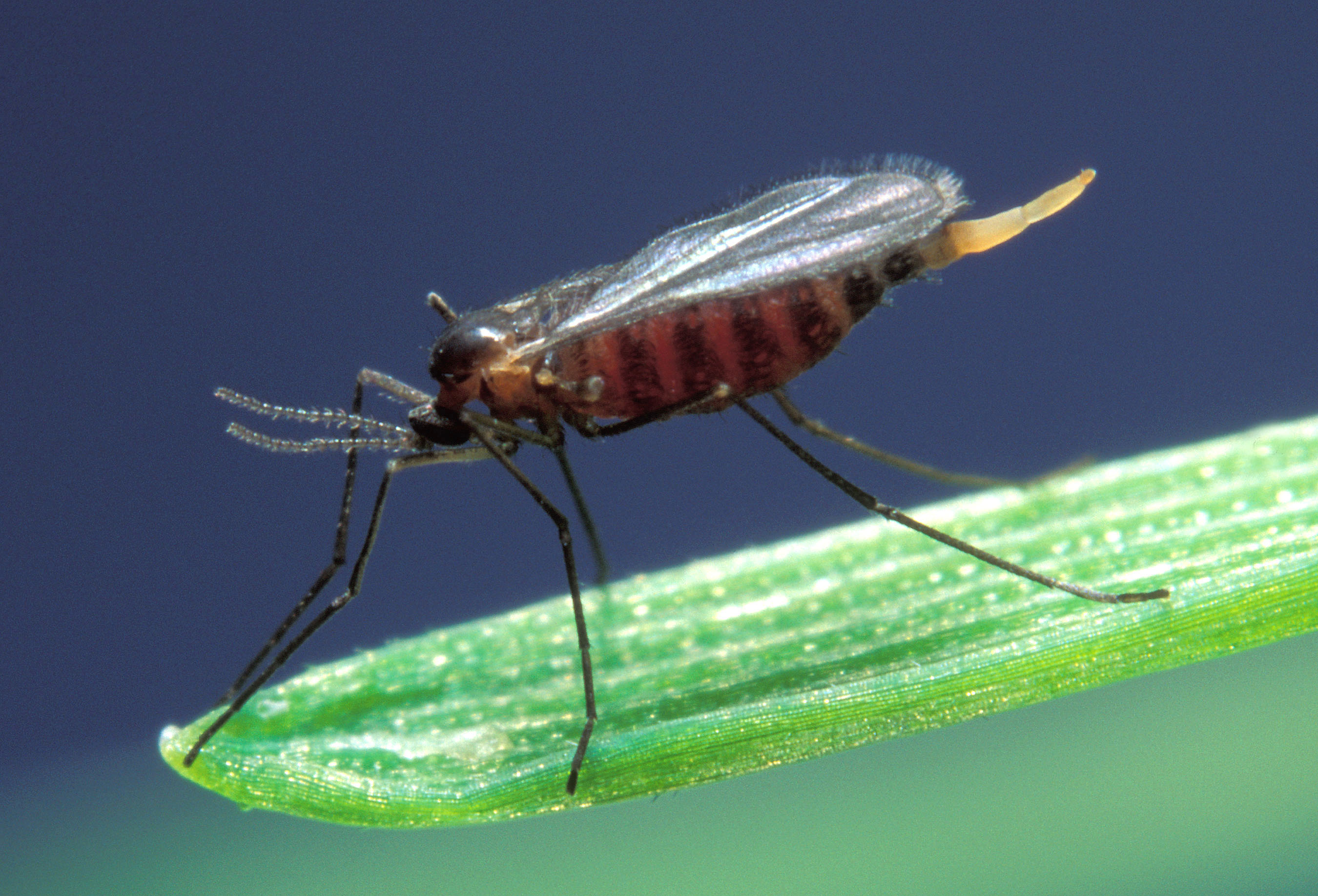
- The Hessian fly (Mayetiola destructor: Oligotrophini)

Scientific classification
- Kingdom: Animalia
- Phylum: Arthropoda
- Clade: Pancrustacea
- Class: Insecta
- Order: Diptera
- Family: Cecidomyiidae
- Subfamily: Cecidomyiinae
- Supertribe: Lasiopteridi

Tribes
- Brachineurini; Lasiopterini; Ledomyiini; Oligotrophini

= Lasiopteridi =

Supertribe of flies

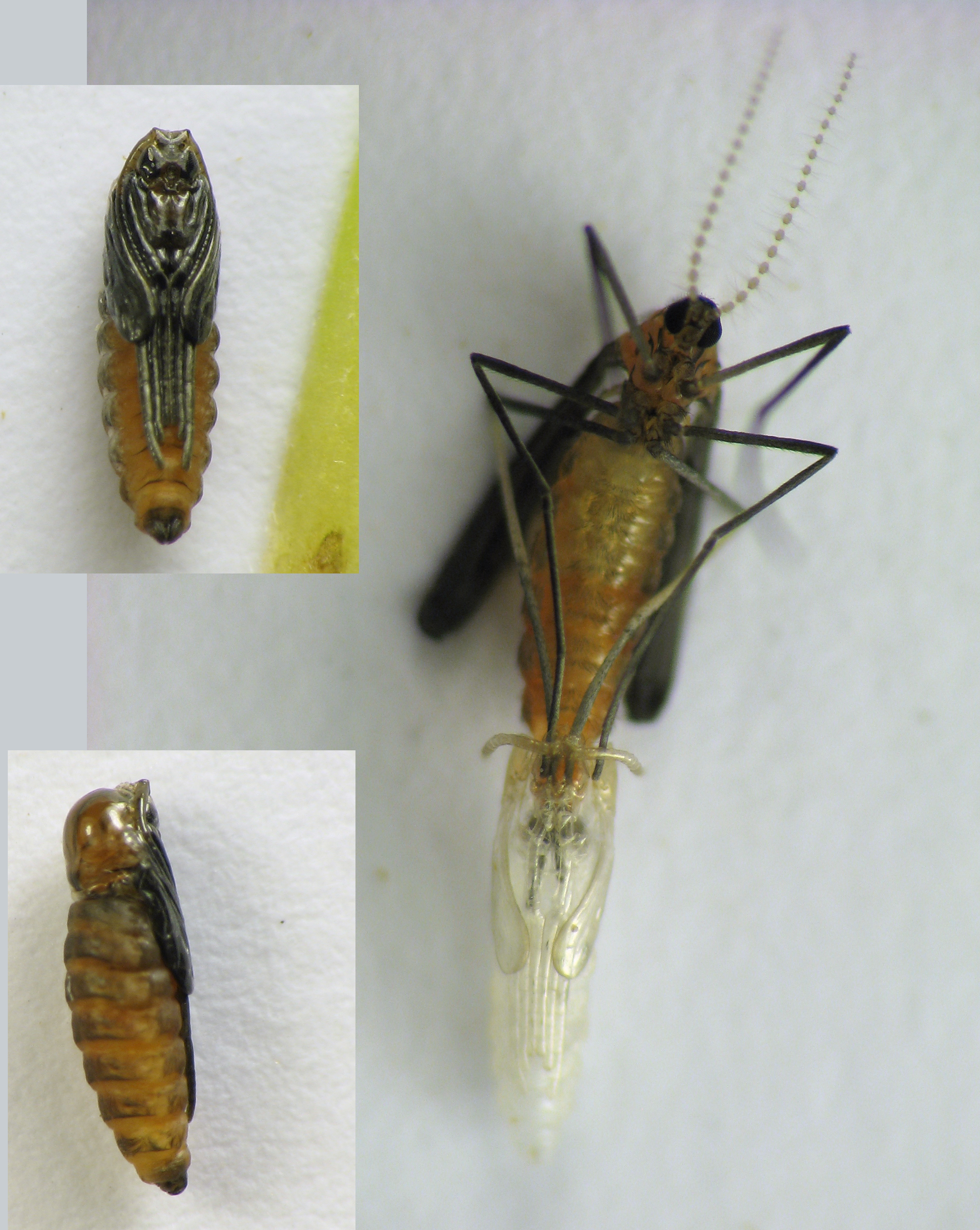
Rhopalomyia solidaginis, pupa and adult.

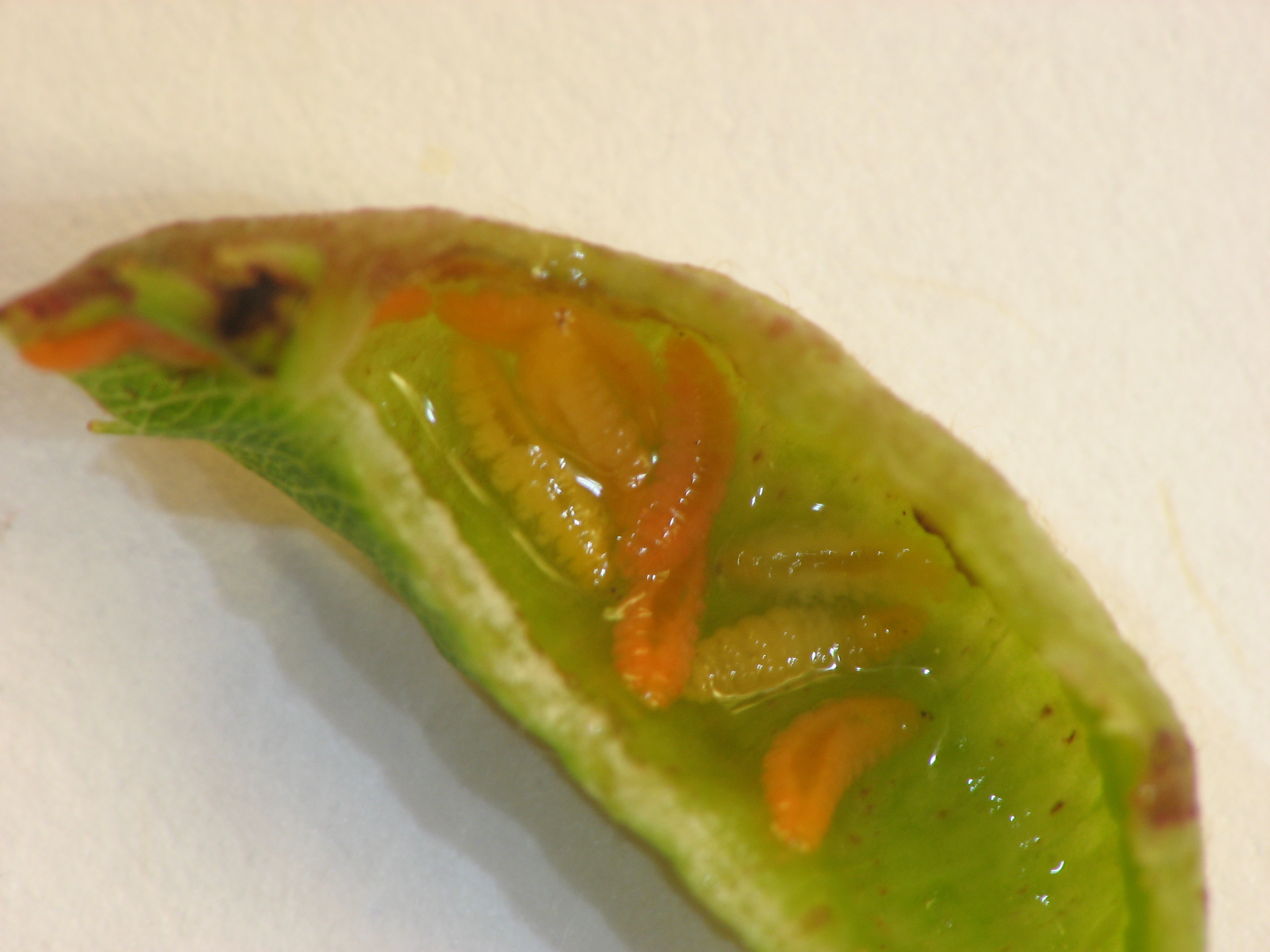
Dasineura salicifoliae larvae inside a gall.

The Lasiopteridi is a supertribe of flies from the family Cecidomyiidae. They are often called gall midges or gall gnats.

== Systematics ==
Lasiopteridi - tribes, and selected genera:

Brachineurini
- Brachineura Rondani, 1840
- Brachyneurina Mamaev, 1967
- Mikiola Kieffer, 1912
- Prolauthia Rübsaamen, 1915
Lasiopterini
- Baldratia Kieffer, 1897
- Hybolasioptera Rübsaamen, 1915
- Lasioptera Fischer von Waldheim\nMeigen, 1818
- Ozirhincus Rondani, 1840
- Stefaniella Kieffer, 1898
Ledomyiini
- Ledomyia Kieffer, 1895
Oligotrophini - selected genera

- Craneiobia Kieffer, 1913
- Cystiphora Kieffer, 1892
- Dasineura Rondani, 1840
- Iteomyia Kieffer, 1913
- Janetiella Kieffer, 1898
- Mayetiola Kieffer, 1896
- Oligotrophus Latreille, 1805
- Rabdophaga Westwood, 1847
- Rhopalomyia Rübsaamen, 1892
- Sackenomyia Felt, 1908
