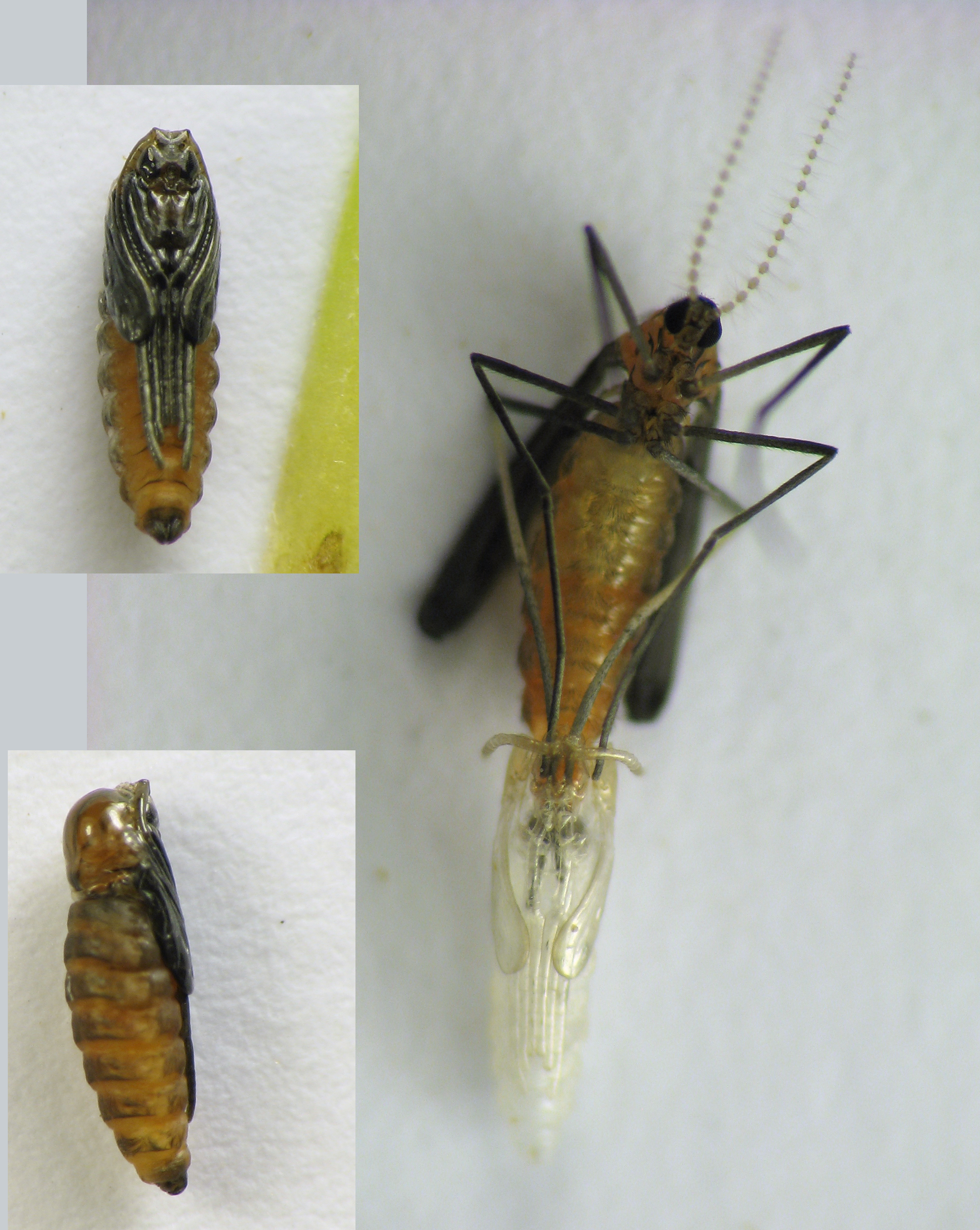
- Rhopalomyia solidaginis, pupa and emerging adult

Scientific classification
- Kingdom: Animalia
- Phylum: Arthropoda
- Clade: Pancrustacea
- Class: Insecta
- Order: Diptera
- Family: Cecidomyiidae
- Tribe: Oligotrophini
- Genus: Rhopalomyia; Rübsaamen, 1892

= Rhopalomyia =

Genus of flies

Rhopalomyia is a genus of gall midges in the family Cecidomyiidae. There are at least 267 described species in the genus Rhopalomyia. Most species in this genus induce galls on plants of the family Asteraceae. This genus has a cosmopolitan distribution. The genus Rhopalomyia was erected by Ewald Heinrich Rübsaamen in 1892.

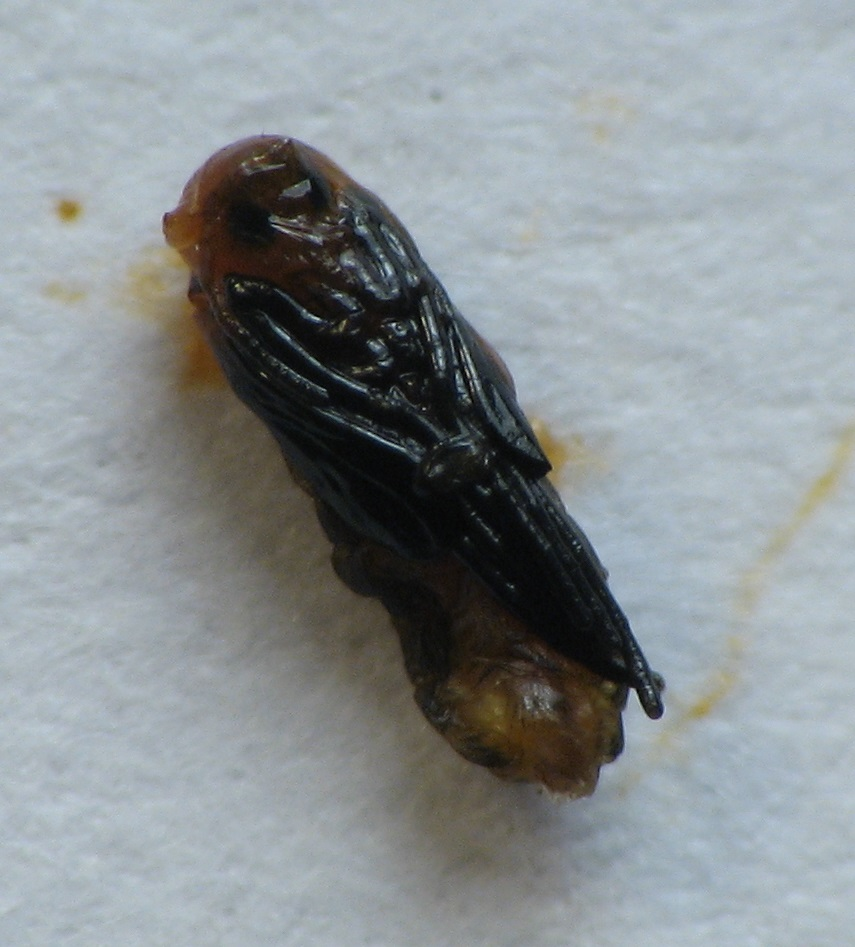
Rhopalomyia clarkei pupa

== See also ==
- List of Rhopalomyia species
