= Northern Nevada Pride =

Annual LGBTQ event in Reno, Nevada, U.S.

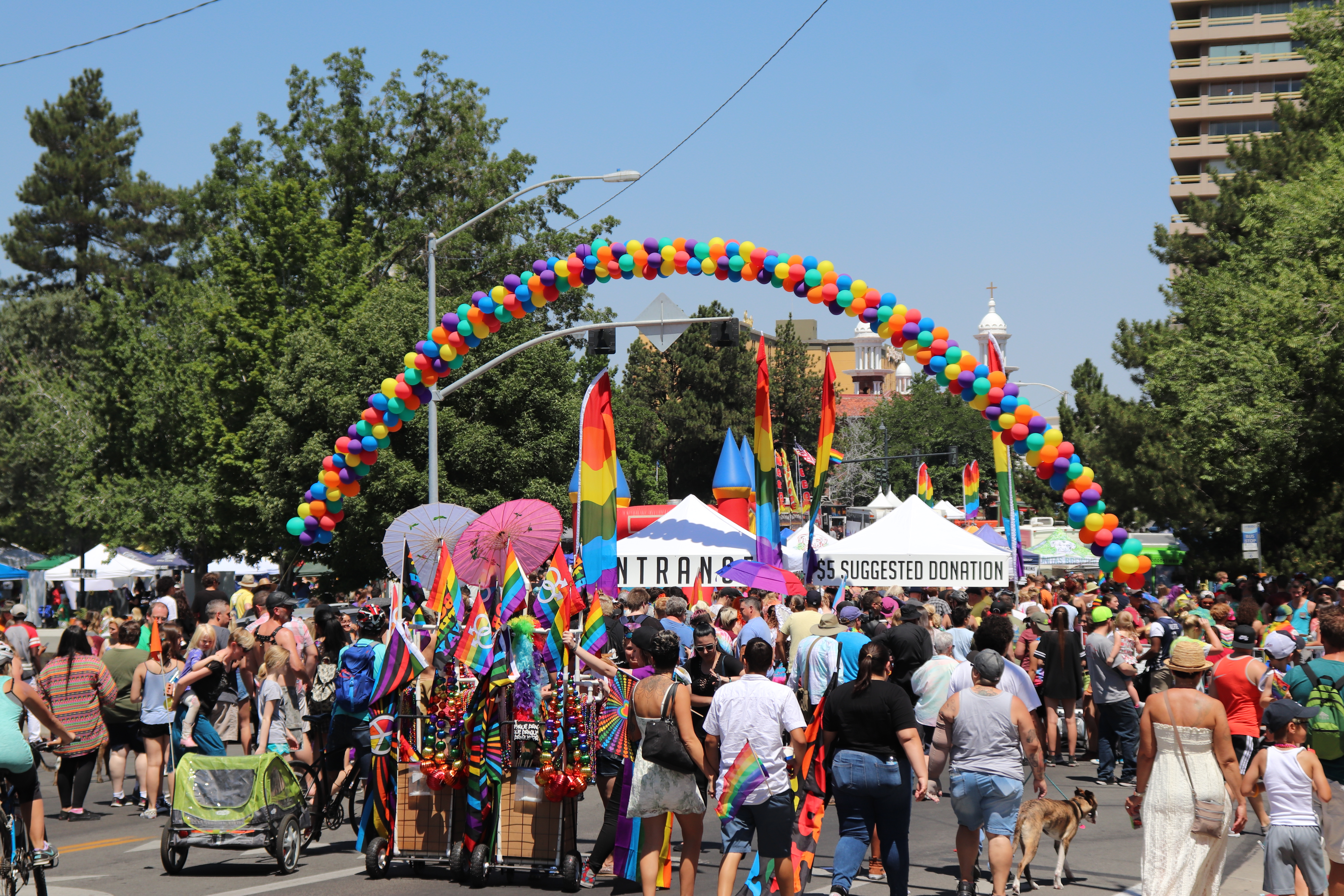
- 2017 Northern Nevada Pride festival
- Status: Active
- Genre: Pride parade and festival
- Frequency: Annual
- Locations: Reno, Nevada, U.S.
- Coordinates: 39°31′1″N 119°48′32″W
- Inaugurated: July 26, 2014; 12 years ago
- Most recent: September 6, 2025
- Attendance: 15,000 (estimated, 2025)
- Organizer: Our Center
- Filing status: 501(c)(3)
- Website: northernnevadapride.org

Northern Nevada Pride is an annual pride parade and festival in Reno, Nevada organized by Our Center, northern Nevada's only LGBTQ+ community center. Past performers include Amadour, Kerri Colby, Dawn, and Suzie Toot.

== History ==
The first Northern Nevada Pride was held on July 26, 2014 as part of Artown. Originally held in Wingfield Park and Downtown Reno, the event now features a parade and festival in MidTown Reno. The second Northern Nevada Pride was held on July 21, 2018. The Reno Gazette-Journal reported hundreds of attendees, with many celebrating Obergefell v. Hodges. Lance Bass attended as a special guest. The third pride festival was attended by the mayor of Reno, Hillary Schieve. The organizers reported they had their highest turnout yet in 2018. The event was held virtually in 2020 due to the COVID-19 pandemic. The following year, it was held in-person, with 14,000 estimated attendees. In 2023, the festival was moved from July to September due to hot weather. In 2025, it was physically moved from Wingfield Park to Midtown due to ongoing construction.

== See also ==
- LGBTQ rights in Nevada
