= Sterling Pacific =

American luggage manufacturer

- Formerly: R. Herz & Bro Inc.
- Industry: Travel, luggage design, manufacturing, and marketing
- Founded: 1907
- Founder: Richard Herz, Carl Otto Herz
- Headquarters: Reno, Nevada
- Products: High-quality luggage
- Website: https://sterlingpacific.com/

Sterling Pacific is a company that manufactures full aluminum travel cases. It was previously known as R. Herz & Bro Inc., which was incorporated in 1907, and was well-known for its jewelry and watches. The company is headquartered in Reno, Nevada.

== History ==
R. Herz & Bro was established by two brothers, Richard Herz and Carl Otto Herz, who immigrated from Leipzig, Germany. Richard left Germany first in 1875, settling in Virginia City as he apprenticed as a jeweler and watch-maker in M. M. Fredericks Jewelers, and Carl Otto later followed his older brother in 1884. They opened their first store in Reno, Nevada, in 1885. As R. Herz & Bro continued to expand their business in Reno, Carl Otto and his wife, who settled in the city, ended up purchasing the Lake Mansion in 1902 from Jane Lake, the previous wife to Myron C. Lake.

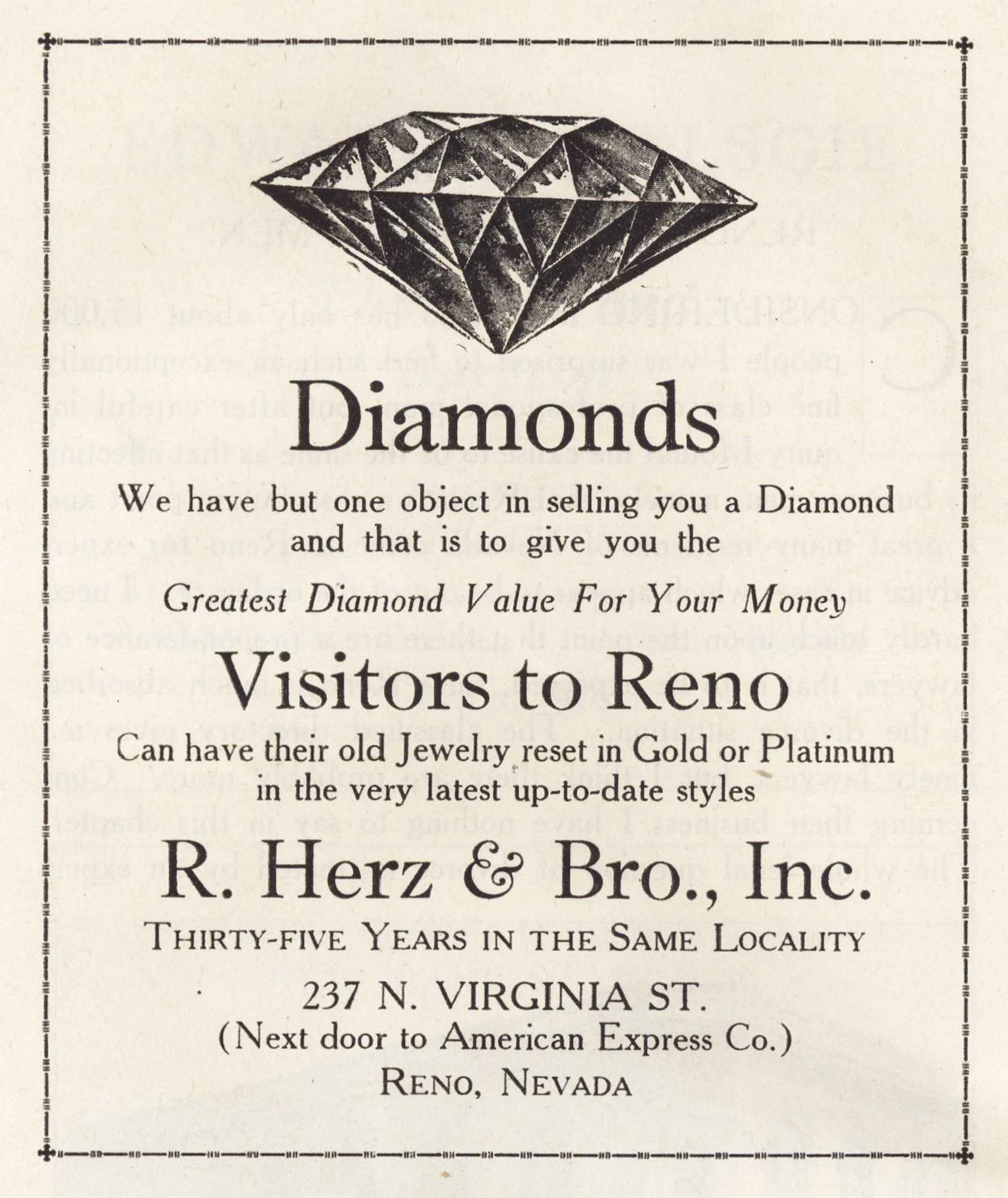
R. Herz & Bro Inc.'s jewelry resetting service advertisement in 1921, published in Six Months in Reno by George W. Bond

In 1910, the company’s founders established the Herz Gold Medal together with the University of Nevada, Reno, to award a gold medal to the graduating senior with the highest GPA each year. Still, in 2021, the award continues to be granted through funding by the university as well as the Thelma B. and Thomas P. Hart Foundation. During the Depression-era, when Nevada became one of the first states that loosened the legal requirements for no-fault divorce, R. Herz & Bro was one of the jewelers who offered wedding ring resetting services for visitors who went to Nevada to dissolve their marriages.

In 1954, the original store burned down after the next-door building caught on fire, and the store was moved to a different location within the same year, although it is still located in Virginia Street. A similar fire incident also occurred in 1965, though the store remained in the same location and was instead rebuilt from the remaining structure. From 1947 to 1965, the store collaborated with a well-known Nevadan firearm engraver, Guy Leutzinger.

The company’s operations have been under the direction of the Herz family since its year of establishment and remained so until 2007 when the R. Herz & Bro store was officially closed. Later, the company was renamed to Sterling Pacific and started offering travel cases as its main products. The company's headquarters are still in Reno, although the location has changed from the original R. Herz & Bro store.

== Products ==
Sterling Pacific offers aluminum suitcases in four sizes, with capacities of 35L, 40L, 80L and 90L. The two-wheel full aluminum design of the suitcases features handles made from Italian leather. The 40L cabin travel case and the 90L check-in travel case features a four-wheel design for better mobility and usability.
