= Hot August Nights =

Annual car festival in Nevada

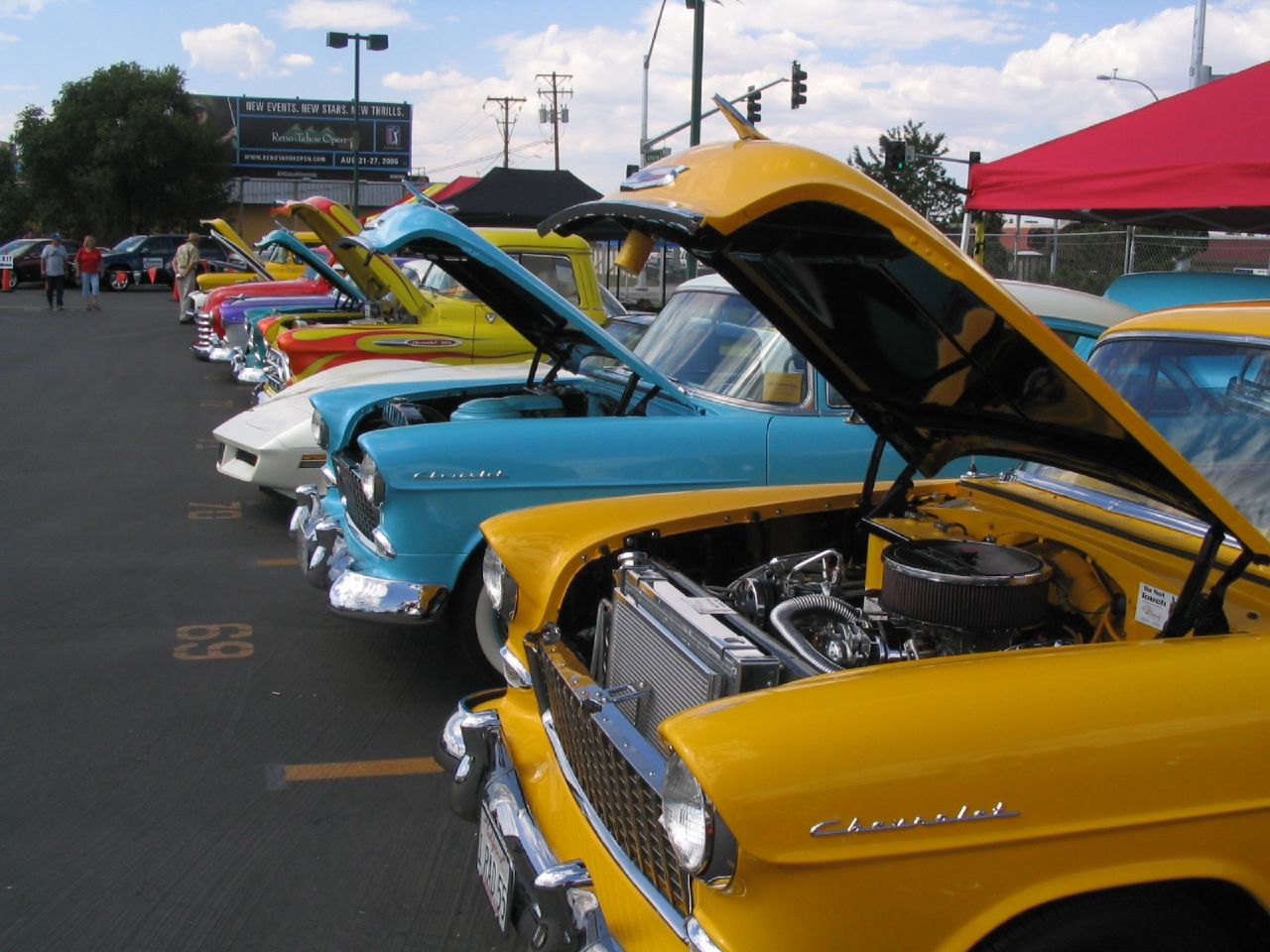
Hot August Nights at the Peppermill in Reno, Nevada

Hot August Nights is an annual event held in Reno and Virginia City, Nevada during the first week in August. The event features classic vehicles manufactured before 1979 and is also based on Classic Rock and roll as well.

The term Hot August Nights got its name from the weather being hot as it generally is during the month of August.

== History ==
Neil Diamond’s epic album at the Greek Theatre on August 24, 1972 brought the term “Hot August Night” to international attention. Later events also using the term were first created by Willie Ray Davison on August 1, 1986 with the intent to celebrate Rock and Roll music, America's culture in the 1950s, to increase tourism during the month and to raise money for charities. The event was first held at the Reno-Sparks Convention Center during a live event with the Righteous Brothers, Wolfman Jack, and Jan & Dean. Over the years, Hot August Nights has featured many notable hot rod, and custom car designers and builders such as George Barris, Ed "Big Daddy" Roth and Tom Daniel to the Event as well as the cast of American Graffiti. The week long event caps off on a parade of registered cars down Virginia Street on Sunday morning, the last day of the celebration.

The event branched off on its own and is now held in several locations, including Virginia City, Victorian Square in Sparks, Peppermill Hotel And Casino, Atlantis Casino Resort Spa, Grand Sierra Resort and Virginia Street in downtown Reno.

On July 5, 2010 it was reported by the Los Angeles Business Journal ^{1} that Hot August Nights would start an event in Long Beach, California, to be held the week before the popular Reno, Nevada event, the summer of 2011. Further, the article claimed that the event in Reno would cease to exist as of summer 2012, and the Long Beach event was to take its place. This caused significant uproar in the Reno community. Hot August Nights officials confirmed that they planned to host events in Long Beach, and that they planned to open offices in Long Beach as well. Officials, however, claimed at the time that there was no truth to the rumors that they wished to discontinue the popular Reno event. ^{2}

The plans for a larger Long Beach, California event never came to fruition.

The event was cancelled in 2020 due to the COVID-19 pandemic, though it is opening again after the COVID-19 pandemic
