= Reno, Nevada =

City in Nevada, United States

Reno
- City
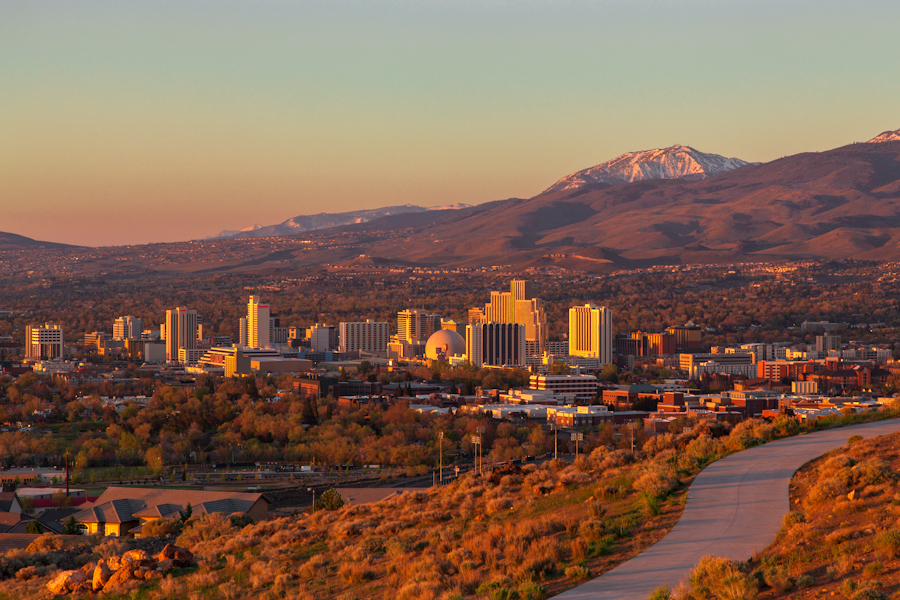
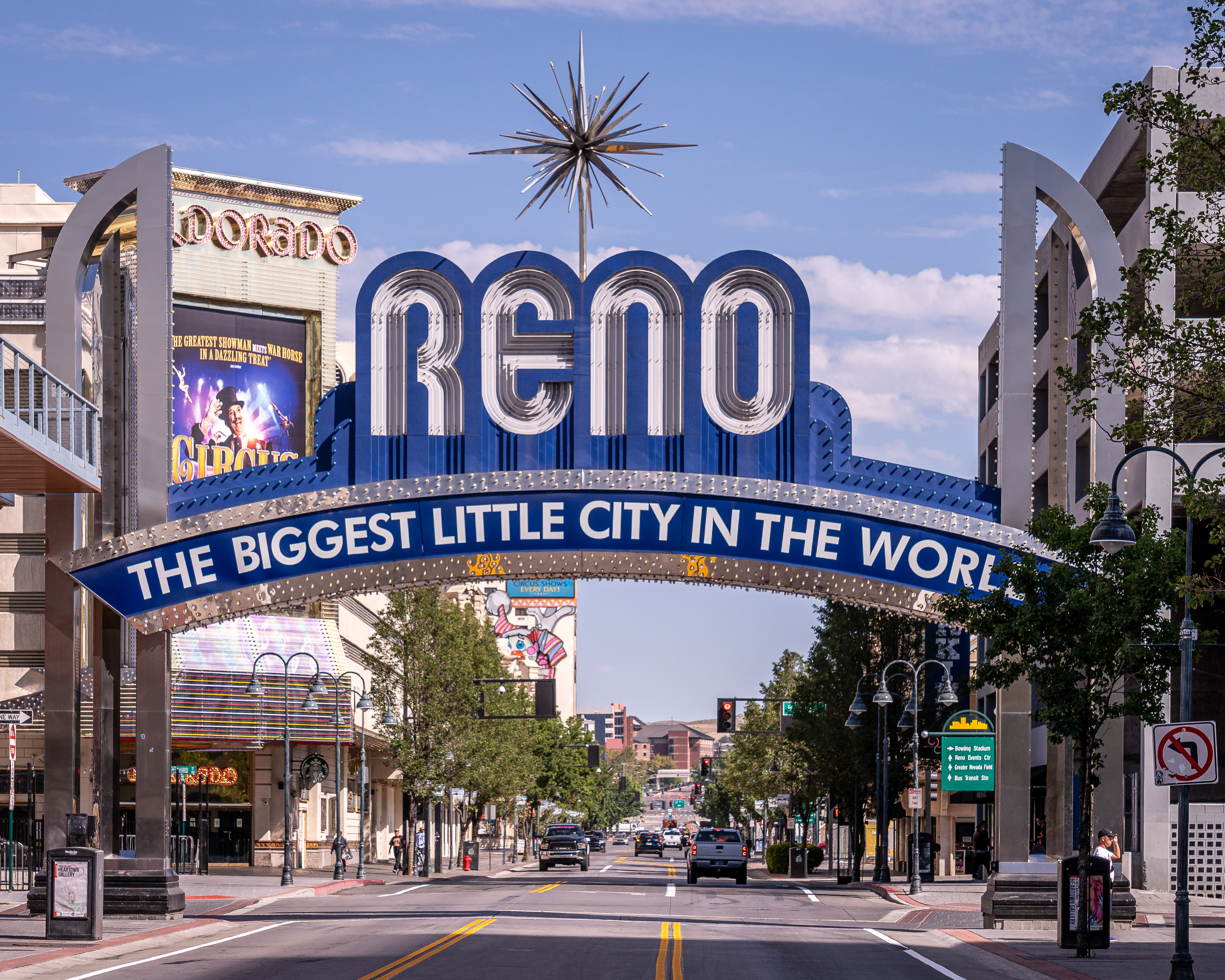
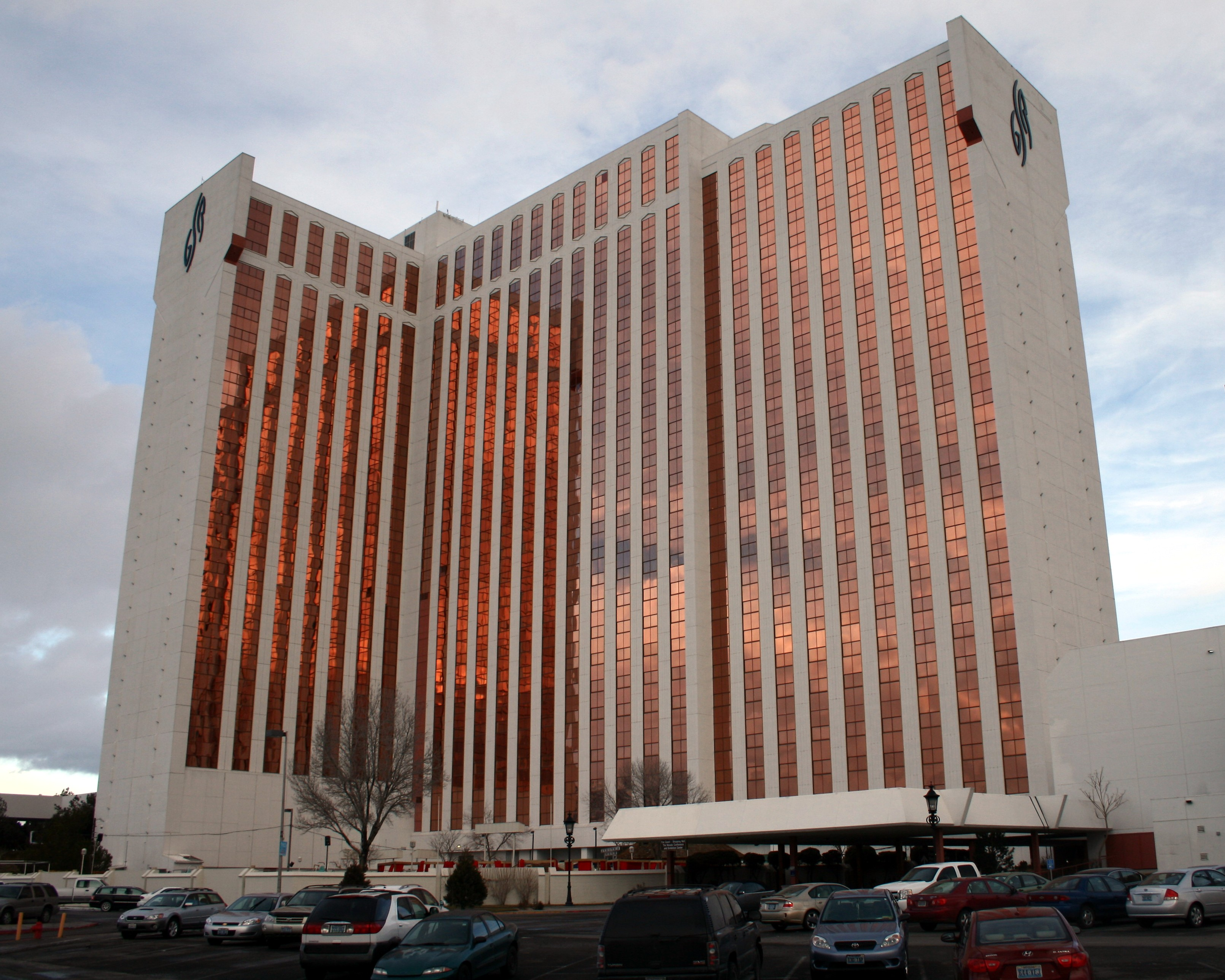
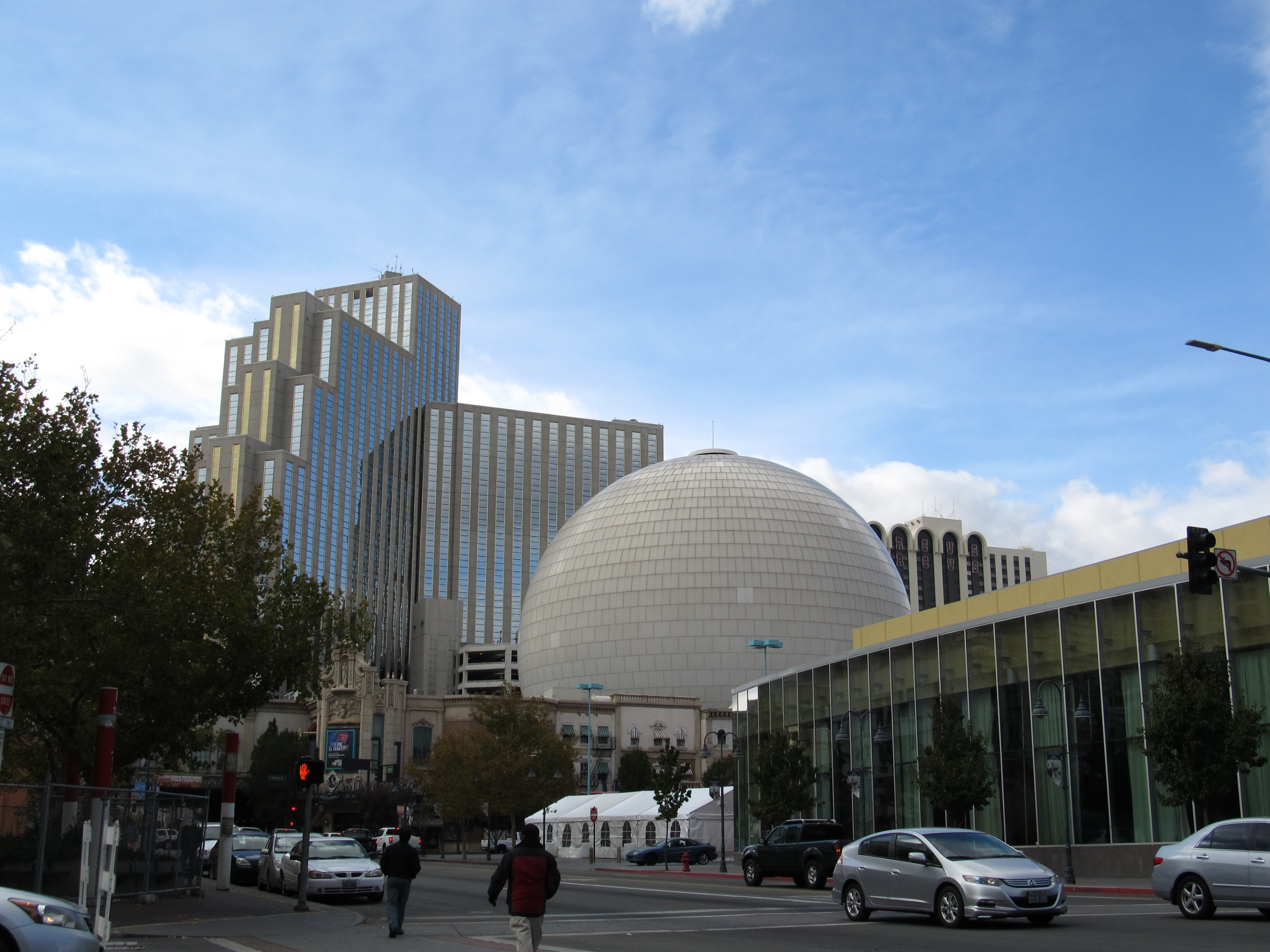
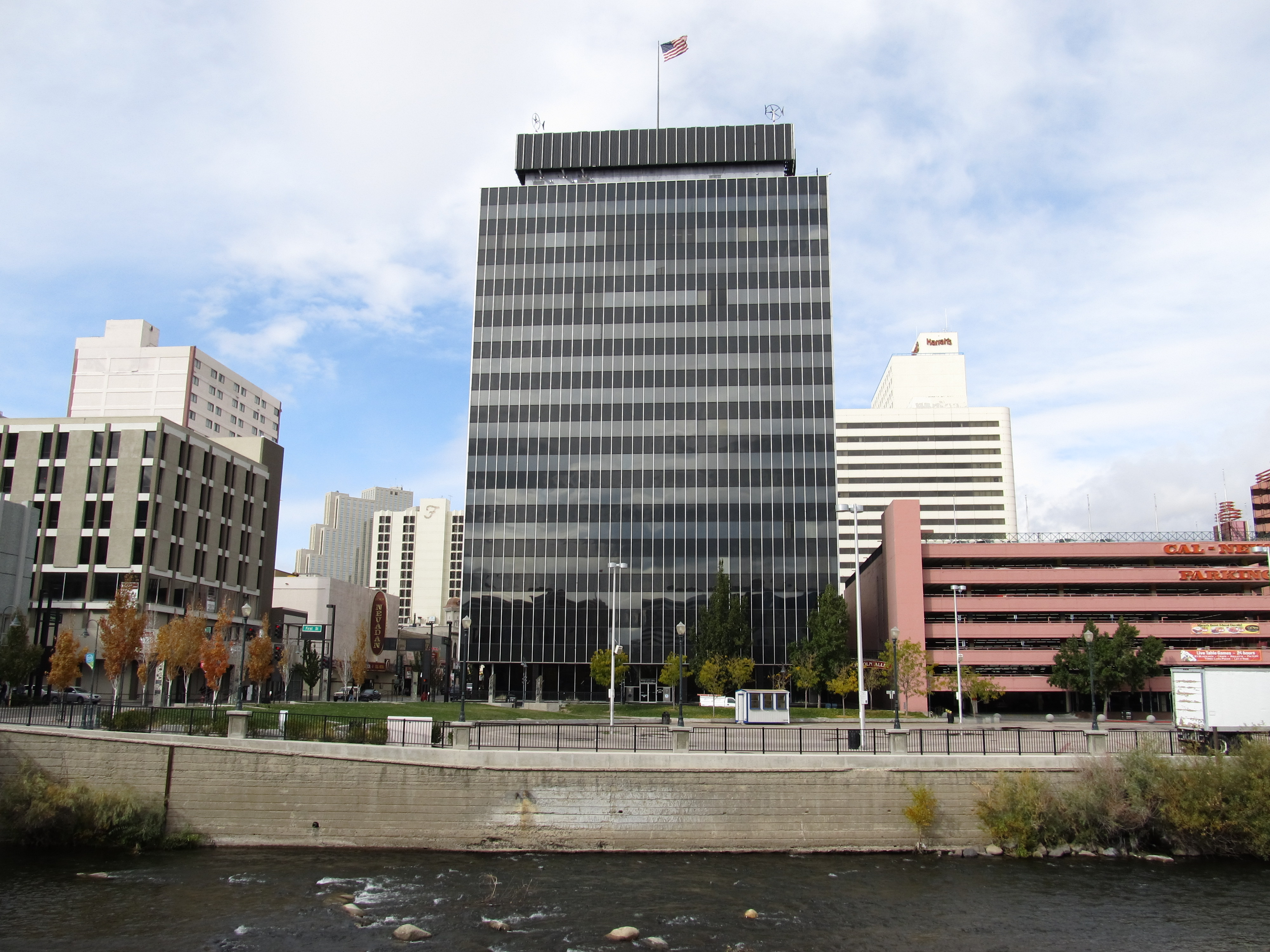
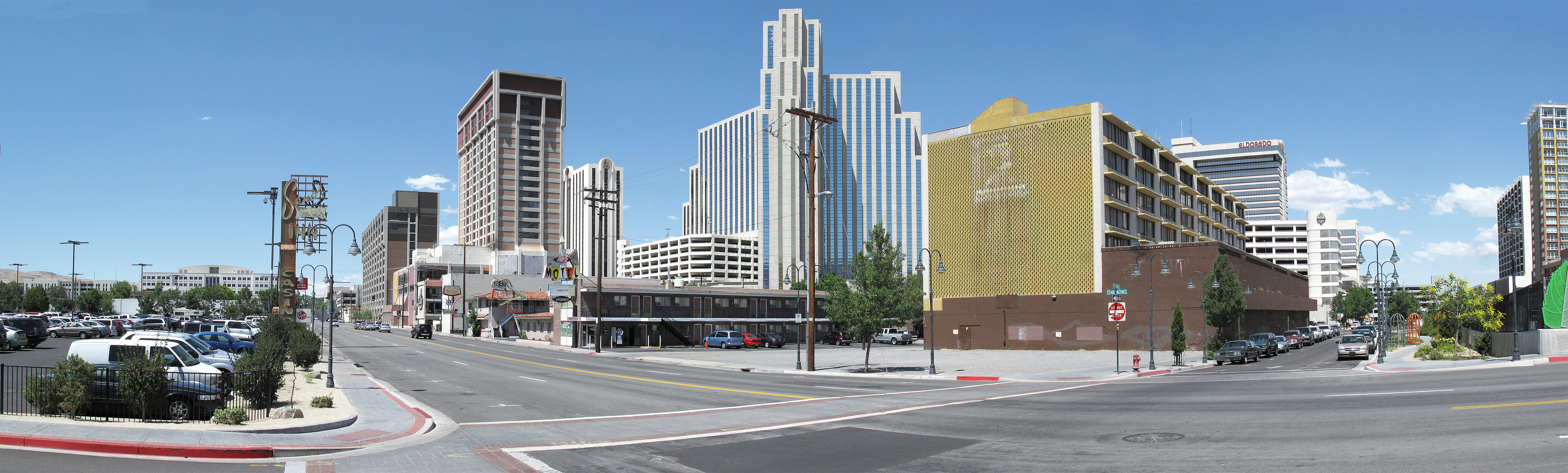
- Reno skyline Reno Arch Grand Sierra Resort Silver Legacy Resort & Casino Reno City Hall Downtown Reno

- Flag Seal Logo
- Nickname: "The Biggest Little City in the World"
- Interactive map of Reno
- Location within Nevada Location within the United States
- Coordinates: 39°31′34″N 119°48′45″W
- Country: United States
- State: Nevada
- County: Washoe
- Founded: May 9, 1868; 158 years ago
- Incorporated: March 16, 1903; 123 years ago
- Named for: Jesse L. Reno

Government
  - Type: Council–manager
  - Mayor: Kate Marshall (D)
  - City manager: Jackie Bryant

Area
  - City: 111.70 sq mi (289.30 km^{2})
  - Land: 108.87 sq mi (281.96 km^{2})
  - Water: 2.83 sq mi (7.34 km^{2})
- Elevation: 4,505 ft (1,373 m)

Population (2020)
  - City: 264,165
  - Estimate (2025): 283,621 ▲
  - Rank: 78th in the United States; 3rd in Nevada (2024)
  - Density: 2,426.5/sq mi (936.89/km^{2})
  - Urban: 446,529 (US: 91st)
  - Urban density: 2,699/sq mi (1,042.2/km^{2})
  - Metro: 490,596 (US: 114th)
- Demonym: Renoites
- Time zone: UTC−08:00 (PST)
  - Summer (DST): UTC−07:00 (PDT)
- ZIP Codes: 89501-89513, 89515, 89519-89521, 89523, 89533, 89555, 89557, 89570, 89595, 89599
- Area code: 775
- FIPS code: 32-60600
- Website: www.reno.gov

Nevada Historical Marker
- Reference no.: 30

Reno (/ˈriːnoʊ/ REE-noh) is a city in the northwest section of the U.S. state of Nevada, along the Nevada–California border. It is the county seat and most populous city of Washoe County. Sitting in the High Eastern Sierra foothills, in the Truckee River valley, on the eastern side of the Sierra Nevada, it is about 23 miles (37 km) northeast of Lake Tahoe. Reno is the 78th most populous city in the United States, the third most populous city in Nevada, and the most populous in Nevada outside the Las Vegas Valley. It is known as "The Biggest Little City in the World" and had a population of 264,165 at the 2020 census.

The city is named after Civil War Union major general Jesse L. Reno, who was killed in action during the American Civil War at the Battle of South Mountain, on Fox's Gap.

The downtowns of Reno and neighboring city Sparks reside in a valley known as the Truckee Meadows, which is sometimes colloquially used as a name for the entire metro area. However, the Reno–Sparks metropolitan area (MSA), the second-largest in Nevada, comprises all of Washoe, Lyon and Storey Counties. In addition, Reno is part of a combined statistical area that includes Carson City, Douglas County and parts of Placer and Nevada Counties in California.

For much of the 20th century, Reno saw a significant number of people seeking to take advantage of Nevada's relatively lax divorce laws and the city gained a national reputation as a divorce mill. Today, Reno is a tourist destination known for its casino gambling and proximity to Lake Tahoe and the Sierra Nevada. The city is also home to the University of Nevada at Reno, the state's second-largest university by enrollment and the flagship campus of the University of Nevada system.

Reno was for decades the most populous city in Nevada, before it ceded this place to Las Vegas, with the 1960 census being the first US census where Las Vegas had more residents than Reno.

== History ==
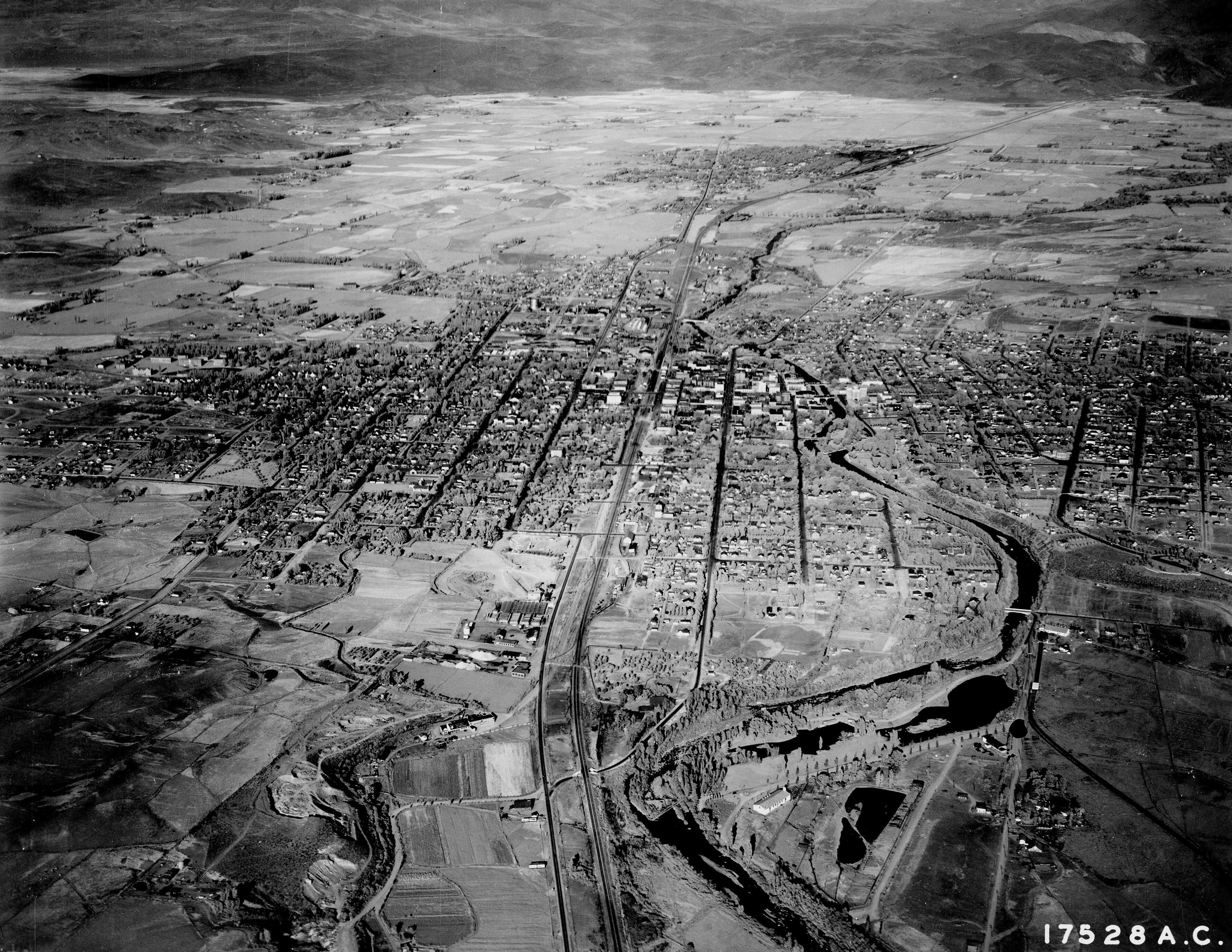
Aerial view of Reno in 1925

=== Early history ===
Archaeological finds place the eastern border of the prehistoric Martis people in the Reno area. As early as the mid-1850s, a few pioneers settled in the Truckee Meadows, a relatively fertile valley through which the Truckee River made its way from Lake Tahoe to Pyramid Lake. In addition to subsistence farming, these early residents could pick up business from travelers along the California Trail, which followed the Truckee westward, before branching off toward Donner Lake, where the formidable obstacle of the Sierra Nevada began.

Gold was discovered in the vicinity of Virginia City in 1850, and a modest mining community developed, but the discovery of silver in 1859 at the Comstock Lode led to a mining rush, and thousands of emigrants left their homes, bound for the West, hoping to find a fortune.

To provide the necessary connection between Virginia City and the California Trail, Charles W. Fuller built a log toll bridge across the Truckee River in 1859. A small community that served travelers soon grew near the bridge. After two years, Fuller sold the bridge to Myron C. Lake, who continued to develop the community by adding a grist mill, kiln, and livery stable to the hotel and eating house. He renamed it "Lake's Crossing". Most of what is present-day western Nevada was formed as the Nevada Territory from part of Utah Territory in 1861.

By January 1863, the Central Pacific Railroad (CPRR) had begun laying tracks east from Sacramento, California, eventually connecting with the Union Pacific Railroad at Promontory, Utah, to form the First transcontinental railroad. Lake deeded land to the CPRR in exchange for its promise to build a depot at Lake's Crossing. In 1864, Washoe County was consolidated with Roop County, and Lake's Crossing became the county's largest town. Lake had earned himself the title "founder of Reno". Once the railroad station was established, the town of Reno officially came into being on May 9, 1868. CPRR construction superintendent Charles Crocker named the community after Major General Jesse Lee Reno, a Union officer killed in the Civil War at the Battle of South Mountain.

In 1871, Reno became the county seat of the newly expanded Washoe County, replacing the county seat in Washoe City. However, political power in Nevada remained with the mining communities, first Virginia City and later Tonopah and Goldfield.

The extension of the Virginia and Truckee Railroad to Reno in 1872 provided a boost to the new city's economy. In the following decades, Reno continued to grow and prosper as a business and agricultural center and became the principal settlement on the transcontinental railroad between Sacramento and Salt Lake City. As the mining boom waned early in the 20th century, Nevada's centers of political and business activity shifted to the non-mining communities, especially Reno and Las Vegas. Nevada is still the third-largest gold producer in the world, after South Africa and Australia; the state yielded 6.9% of the world's supply in 2005 world gold production.

The Reno Arch was erected on Virginia Street in 1926 to promote the upcoming Transcontinental Highways Exposition of 1927. The arch included the words "Nevada's Transcontinental Highways Exposition" and the dates of the exposition. After the exposition, the Reno City Council decided to keep the arch as a permanent downtown gateway, and Mayor E.E. Roberts asked the citizens of Reno to suggest a slogan for the arch. No acceptable slogan was received until a $100 prize was offered, and G.A. Burns of Sacramento was declared the winner on March 14, 1929, with "Reno, the Biggest Little City in the World".

=== The divorce capital of the world ===
In the early 20th century, Nevada became a popular destination for migratory divorce in an era when most states had highly restrictive laws on the subject. Legislation passed in 1931 completed the gradual reduction of the residency requirement from six months to six weeks, and Reno openly advertised itself as the "Divorce Capital of the World". Nevada's laws, which were fairly progressive for the time, allowed numerous grounds for divorce, and Reno's courts quickly gained a reputation for handling cases with both speed and sympathy for those seeking to "untie the knot". From the 1930s through the 1960s, Reno became synonymous with speedy divorce, often referred to colloquially as "the six-week cure". During these decades, the city's reputation drew thousands of divorcees annually, and they in turn became an important part of the local economy. These temporary residents flocked to hotels, boardinghouses, and hospitality ranches, many of which catered primarily to those waiting out the six-week residency requirement before their court date.

Numerous local businesses openly courted these visitors, such as R. Herz & Bro, a jewelry store that offered ring resetting services to the recently divorced and the luxurious El Cortez Hotel, which was built in part to accommodate the more affluent among Reno's six-week guests. The majority of those who came to Reno for divorce were women as Nevada did not require both parties in a divorce case to be present in court, and men often could not take that much time off from work. Although new "residents" seeking divorce were required to swear under oath that they intended to make Nevada their permanent home, most left soon after obtaining their divorce decree, which often occurred on the same day as the initial court hearing.

In addition to ordinary residents, Reno also became a major destination for celebrities and the very wealthy looking to end their marriages as quickly as possible. Some of the many famous personages who got divorced in Reno include Mary Pickford, Jack Dempsey, General Douglas MacArthur, Carole Lombard, Tallulah Bankhead, Adlai Stevenson II, Lana Turner, Nelson Rockefeller, Georges Simenon, Rita Hayworth, Gloria Vanderbilt and Cornelius Vanderbilt IV. The latter was married seven times and had five of his six divorces in Nevada. Mr. Vanderbilt was so taken with Reno that, unlike most migrant divorcees, he eventually settled there permanently.

In the 1939 film The Women, Reno and its divorce culture serve as a backdrop to a significant part of the plot. Ernie Pyle once wrote in one of his columns, "All the people you saw on the streets in Reno were obviously there to get divorces." In Ayn Rand's novel The Fountainhead, published in 1943, the New York-based female protagonist tells a friend, "I am going to Reno," which was understood as declaring their intention to get a divorce.

Reno's divorce industry declined rapidly after the 1970s as other states, including California (which legalized no fault divorce in 1969), liberalized their divorce laws, reducing Nevada's legal advantage.

=== Gambling and modern Reno ===
Reno took a leap forward when the state of Nevada legalized open gambling on March 19, 1931, at the same time as it liberalized its divorce laws. The statewide push for legal Nevada gambling was led by Reno entrepreneur Bill Graham, who owned the Bank Club Casino in Reno, which was on Center Street. No other state offered legalized casino gaming like Nevada did in the 1930s, and casinos such as the Bank Club and Palace were popular. A few states had legal parimutuel horse racing, but no other state had legal casino gambling.

Within a few years, the Bank Club, owned by George Wingfield, Bill Graham, and Jim McKay, was the state's largest employer and the largest casino in the world. Wingfield owned most of the buildings in town that housed gaming and took a percentage of the profits, along with his rent.

As the divorce industry declined, gambling became the major Reno industry. While gaming pioneers such as "Pappy" and Harold Smith of Harold's Club and Bill Harrah of the soon-to-dominate Harrah's Casino set up shop in the 1930s, the war years of the 1940s cemented Reno as the place to play for two decades. Beginning in the 1950s, the need for economic diversification beyond gaming fueled a movement for more lenient business taxation.

At 1:03 pm, on February 5, 1957, two explosions, caused by natural gas leaking into the maze of pipes and ditches under the city, and an ensuing fire, destroyed five buildings in the vicinity of Sierra and First Streets along the Truckee River. The disaster killed two people and injured 49. The first explosion hit under the block of shops on the west side of Sierra Street (now the site of the Century Riverside), the second, across Sierra Street, now the site of the Palladio.

The presence of a main east–west rail line, the emerging interstate highway system, a favorable state tax climate, and relatively inexpensive land created good conditions for warehousing and distribution of goods.

In the 1980s, Indian gaming rules were relaxed, and starting in 2000, Californian Native casinos began to cut into Reno casino revenues. Major new construction projects have been completed in the Reno and Sparks areas. A few new luxury communities were built in Truckee, California, about 28 miles (45 km) west of Reno on Interstate 80. Reno also is an outdoor recreation destination, due to its proximity to the Sierra Nevada, Lake Tahoe, and numerous ski resorts in the region.

In 2018, the city officially changed its flag after a local contest was held. In recent years, the Reno metro area − spurred by large-scale investments from Greater Seattle and San Francisco Bay Area companies such as Amazon, Tesla, Panasonic, Microsoft, Apple, and Google − has become a new major technology center in the United States.

== Geography ==
=== Geology ===
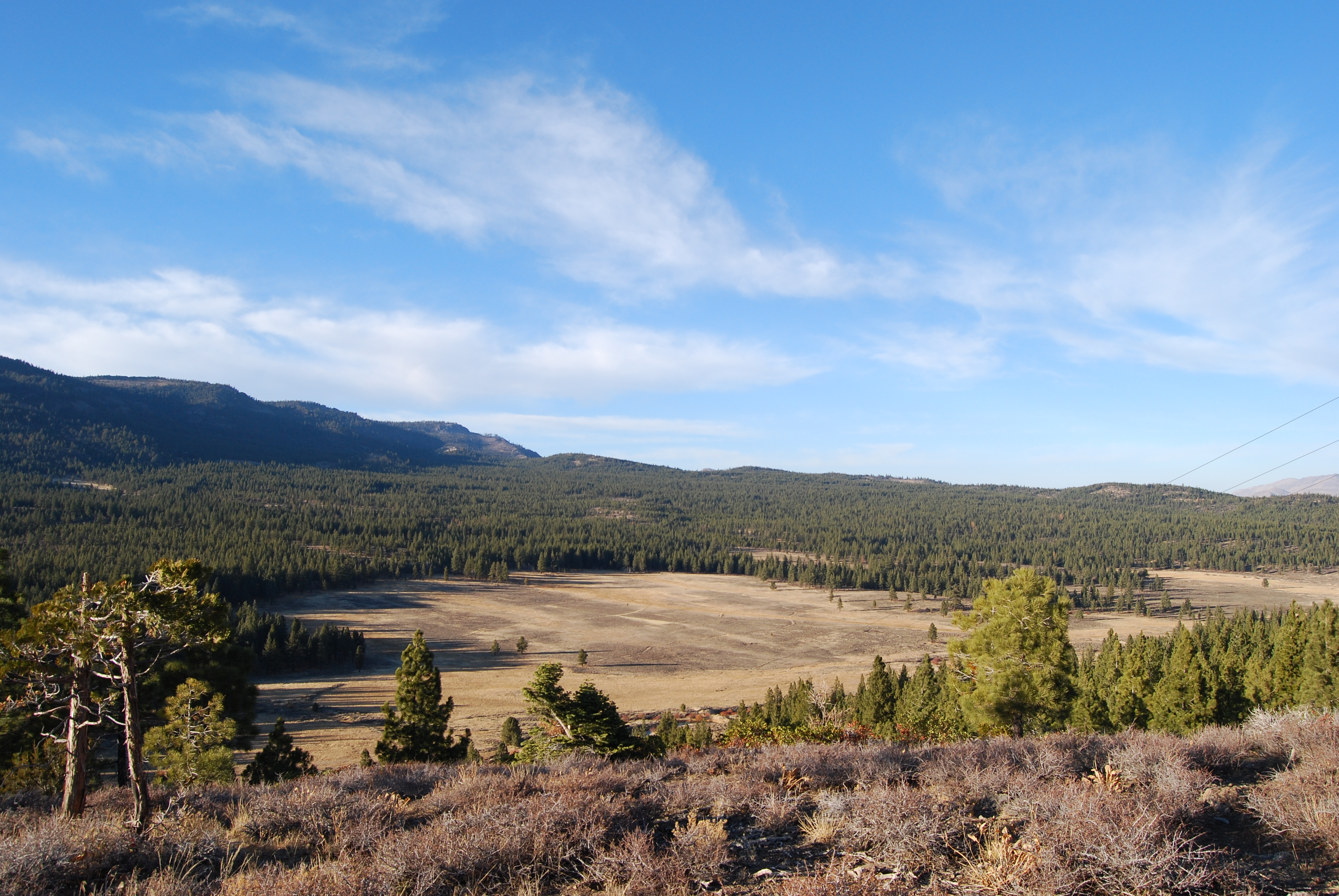
Dog Valley, west of Reno, an area of active faulting

Reno is just east of the Sierra Nevada, on the western edge of the Great Basin at an elevation of about 4,400 feet (1,300 m) above sea level. Numerous faults exist throughout the region. Most of these are normal (vertical motion) faults associated with the extension of the earth's lithosphere and the uplift of the various mountain ranges, including the Sierra Nevada.

In February 2008, an earthquake swarm began to occur, lasting for several months. The largest event in the swarm was measured at magnitude 4.9 by the USGS; some seismic analyses suggested it may have approached magnitude 5.0. The earthquakes were centered on the Somersett community in western Reno near Mogul and Verdi. Many homes in these areas were damaged.

Nevada's high desert geology and vast federal lands attract amateur rockhounders and mineral collectors, who commonly find agate, opal, jasper, petrified wood, and fluorescent minerals.

=== Environmental considerations ===
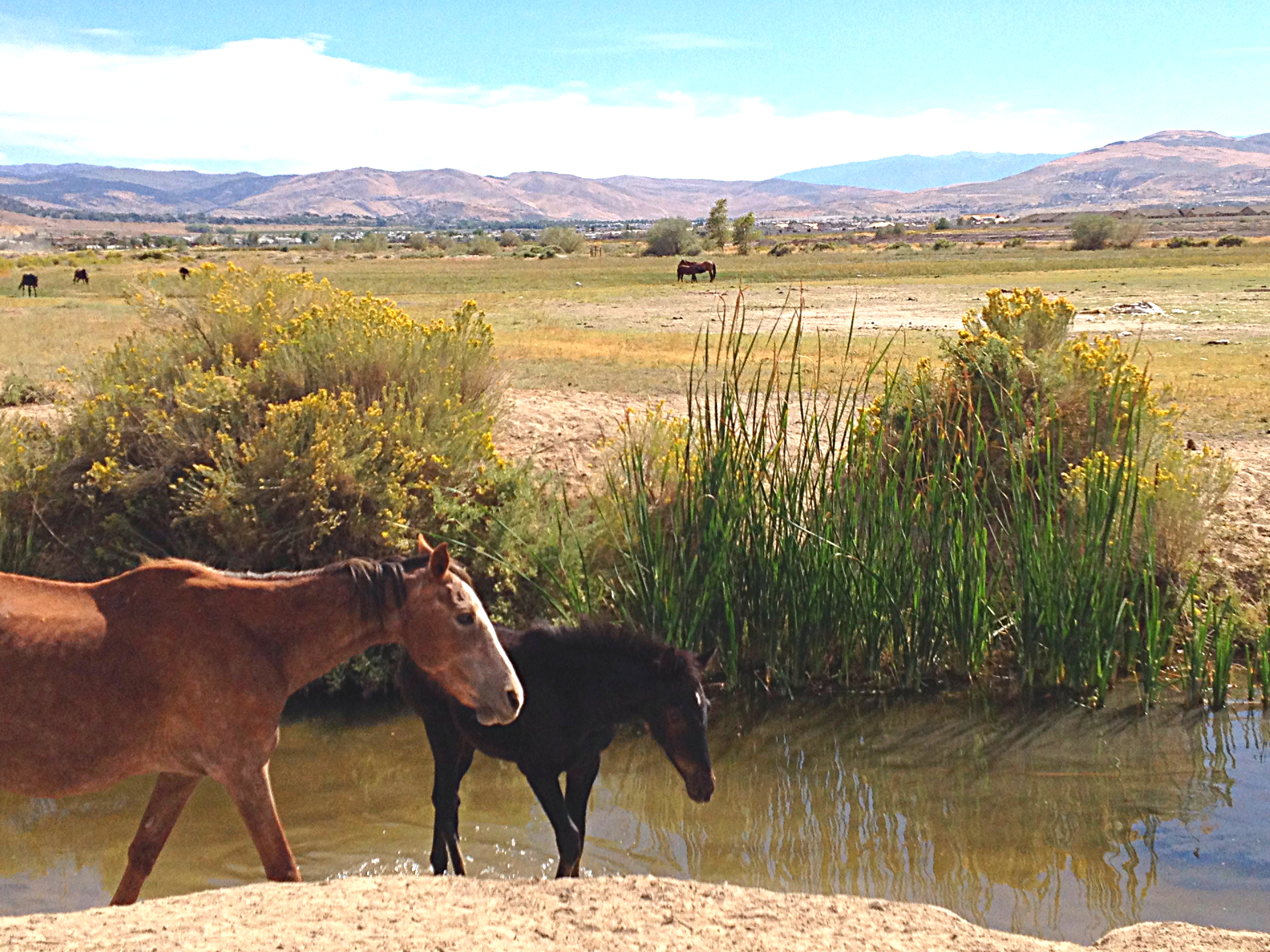
Reno Nevada and the Truckee Meadows south west of the Reno Tahoe International Airport has a large herd of mustang horses. These horses nurse and range around the runoff of Steamboat Creek. The mustang is a notable iconic image of the Nevada range land, which includes Reno.

The Reno area is often subject to wildfires that cause property damage and sometimes loss of life. Roughly 80% of homes in the area have a risk of being impacted by wildfire. In August 1960, the Donner Ridge fire resulted in a loss of electricity to the city for four days. In November 2011, arcing from powerlines caused a fire in Caughlin in southwest Reno that destroyed 26 homes and killed one man. Just two months later, a fire in Washoe Drive sparked by fireplace ashes destroyed 29 homes and killed one woman. Around 10,000 residents were evacuated, and a state of emergency was declared. The fires came at the end of Reno's longest recorded dry spell. In September 2024, the Davis Fire burned heavily forested regions in Southwest Reno. Fourteen structures burned in the area, and twenty thousand people were evacuated.

=== Climate ===
Reno has a cold semi-arid climate (Köppen: BSk), bordering a hot-summer Mediterranean climate (Köppen: Csa) to the west. It experiences moderately cold winters and hot summers; it is influenced by the Sierra Nevada mountains to the west and the more arid Great Basin to the east. It is situated across a varied geographic landscape, which extends from the foothills of the Sierra Nevada into the Truckee River valley. While Reno experiences a rain shadow effect from the surrounding mountains, its western portions can receive three to four times as much precipitation as those extending eastward. Annual rainfall patterns in Reno adhere to a Mediterranean climate, with most precipitation occurring in fall, winter, and spring, followed by long, hot, dry summers. However, Reno's average annual rainfall is slightly lower than that of Californian cities more typically associated with Mediterranean climates. The area's low evapotranspiration stemming from its moderate annual average temperature also bears similarity to semi-arid climates found in Nevada's Great Basin.

The monthly daily average temperature ranges from 36.2 °F (2.3 °C) in December to 77.2 °F (25.1 °C) in July, with the diurnal temperature variation occasionally reaching 40 °F (22 °C) in summer, still lower than much of the high desert to the east. There are 6.0 days of 100 °F (38 °C)+ highs, 65 days of 90 °F (32 °C)+ highs, 1.6 days with 70 °F (21 °C)+ lows, and 1.9 days with sub-10 °F (−12 °C) lows annually; the temperature reaches or dips below the freezing point on 122 days, and does not rise above freezing on only 4.1 of those days. The record high temperature is 108 °F (42 °C), which occurred on July 10 and 11, 2002, again on July 5, 2007, and again on July 16, 2023. The record low temperature is −17 °F (−27 °C), which occurred on January 21, 1916; the lowest temperature recorded at the airport is −16 °F (−27 °C), which occurred on four occasions, most recently on February 7, 1989. In addition, the region is windy throughout the year; the region's distinctive northwestern wind, known as the 'Washoe Zephyr,' has been noted by regional observers and writers.

Annual precipitation has ranged from 1.55 in (39.4 mm) in 1947 to 13.73 inches (348.7 mm) in 2017. The most precipitation in one month was 6.76 in (171.7 mm) in January 1916, and the most precipitation in 24 hours was 2.71 in (68.8 mm) on January 28, 1903. At Reno–Tahoe International Airport, where records go back to 1937, the most precipitation in one month was 5.57 in (141.5 mm) in January 2017, and the most precipitation in 24 hours was 2.29 in (58.2 mm) on January 21, 1943.

Most rainfall occurs in winter and spring. Summer thunderstorms can occur between April and October. The eastern side of town and the mountains east of Reno tend to be prone to thunderstorms more often, and these storms may be severe because an afternoon downslope west wind, called a "Washoe Zephyr", can develop in the Sierra Nevada, causing air to be pulled down in the Sierra Nevada and Reno, destroying or preventing thunderstorms, but the same wind can push air upward against the Virginia Range and other mountain ranges east of Reno, creating powerful thunderstorms.

Winter snowfall is usually light to moderate, but can be heavy on some days, averaging 20.9 inches (53 cm) annually. Snowfall varies with the lowest amounts (roughly 19–23 inches annually) at the lowest part of the valley at and east of the airport at 4,404 feet (1,342 m), while the foothills of the Carson Range to the west ranging from 4,700 to 5,600 feet (1,400 to 1,700 m) in elevation just a few miles west of downtown can receive two to three times as much annual snowfall. The mountains of the Virginia Range to the east, meanwhile, can receive more summer thunderstorms and precipitation, and around twice as much annual snowfall above 5,500 feet (1,700 m). However, snowfall increases in the Virginia Range are less dramatic as elevation climbs than in the Carson Range to the west, because the Virginia Range is well within the rain shadow of the Sierra Nevada and Carson Range. The most snowfall in Reno in one winter was 72.3 inches (184 cm) in 1915–1916, with an astonishing 65.7 inches (167 cm) in January, the most in a calendar month, as well as 22.5 inches (57 cm) on January 17, the most in a calendar day; the most snowfall in a calendar year was 82.3 inches (209 cm) in 1916.

Climate data for Reno (RNO), 1991–2020 normals, (Note: Mean maxima and minima (i.e., the highest and lowest temperature readings during an entire month or year) calculated based on data at said location from 1991 to 2020.) extremes 1893–present (Note: Official records for Reno kept January 1893 to November 10, 1905, at "Reno", November 11, 1905, to February 1937 at Reno Weather Bureau Office (CRB), and at Reno–Tahoe International Airport since March 1937. For more information, see Threadex)
Month	Jan	Feb	Mar	Apr	May	Jun	Jul	Aug	Sep	Oct	Nov	Dec	Year
Record high °F (°C)	71 (22)	75 (24)	83 (28)	90 (32)	99 (37)	104 (40)	108 (42)	105 (41)	106 (41)	93 (34)	78 (26)	71 (22)	108 (42)
Mean maximum °F (°C)	61.2 (16.2)	65.3 (18.5)	73.9 (23.3)	80.9 (27.2)	89.4 (31.9)	97.0 (36.1)	102.1 (38.9)	100.0 (37.8)	94.5 (34.7)	85.0 (29.4)	71.5 (21.9)	61.7 (16.5)	102.6 (39.2)
Mean daily maximum °F (°C)	47.7 (8.7)	52.1 (11.2)	59.2 (15.1)	64.7 (18.2)	74.1 (23.4)	84.6 (29.2)	93.9 (34.4)	92.1 (33.4)	83.8 (28.8)	70.4 (21.3)	56.7 (13.7)	46.7 (8.2)	68.8 (20.4)
Daily mean °F (°C)	36.9 (2.7)	40.6 (4.8)	46.6 (8.1)	51.6 (10.9)	60.3 (15.7)	69.2 (20.7)	77.2 (25.1)	75.1 (23.9)	67.0 (19.4)	55.1 (12.8)	43.8 (6.6)	36.2 (2.3)	55.0 (12.8)
Mean daily minimum °F (°C)	26.1 (−3.3)	29.0 (−1.7)	34.0 (1.1)	38.5 (3.6)	46.6 (8.1)	53.8 (12.1)	60.4 (15.8)	58.1 (14.5)	50.3 (10.2)	39.7 (4.3)	31.0 (−0.6)	25.7 (−3.5)	41.1 (5.1)
Mean minimum °F (°C)	12.2 (−11.0)	16.1 (−8.8)	21.3 (−5.9)	26.2 (−3.2)	34.0 (1.1)	41.0 (5.0)	50.7 (10.4)	48.5 (9.2)	39.0 (3.9)	27.4 (−2.6)	17.4 (−8.1)	11.3 (−11.5)	6.6 (−14.1)
Record low °F (°C)	−17 (−27)	−16 (−27)	−3 (−19)	13 (−11)	16 (−9)	25 (−4)	33 (1)	24 (−4)	20 (−7)	8 (−13)	1 (−17)	−16 (−27)	−17 (−27)
Average precipitation inches (mm)	1.25 (32)	1.03 (26)	0.80 (20)	0.44 (11)	0.55 (14)	0.41 (10)	0.20 (5.1)	0.24 (6.1)	0.21 (5.3)	0.50 (13)	0.62 (16)	1.10 (28)	7.35 (187)
Average snowfall inches (cm)	5.2 (13)	5.2 (13)	2.9 (7.4)	0.4 (1.0)	0.1 (0.25)	0.0 (0.0)	0.0 (0.0)	0.0 (0.0)	0.0 (0.0)	0.1 (0.25)	1.8 (4.6)	5.2 (13)	20.9 (53)
Average precipitation days (≥ 0.01 in)	6.9	7.0	5.5	4.5	4.4	3.1	1.7	1.6	2.0	2.9	4.3	6.6	50.5
Average snowy days (≥ 0.1 in)	3.4	3.3	2.0	0.7	0.2	0.0	0.0	0.0	0.0	0.1	1.2	3.0	13.9
Average relative humidity (%)	68.0	60.2	52.7	45.9	43.2	39.9	36.2	39.3	44.0	50.7	61.2	67.6	50.7
Average dew point °F (°C)	21.2 (−6.0)	23.0 (−5.0)	23.5 (−4.7)	25.3 (−3.7)	31.5 (−0.3)	36.5 (2.5)	39.6 (4.2)	39.4 (4.1)	34.9 (1.6)	29.5 (−1.4)	25.3 (−3.7)	21.0 (−6.1)	29.2 (−1.5)
Mean monthly sunshine hours	195.6	204.2	291.0	332.1	375.8	393.8	424.0	390.8	343.9	295.2	212.0	187.5	3,645.9
Percentage possible sunshine	65	68	78	83	84	88	93	92	92	85	70	64	82
Source: NOAA (relative humidity, dew points and sun 1961–1990)

Climate data for Stead, 1991–2020 normals (Note: Mean maxima and minima (i.e., the highest and lowest temperature readings during an entire month or year) calculated based on data at said location from 1991 to 2020.)
Month	Jan	Feb	Mar	Apr	May	Jun	Jul	Aug	Sep	Oct	Nov	Dec	Year
Mean daily maximum °F (°C)	43.4 (6.3)	47.2 (8.4)	53.9 (12.2)	59.5 (15.3)	69.0 (20.6)	79.2 (26.2)	88.8 (31.6)	87.1 (30.6)	79.4 (26.3)	66.3 (19.1)	52.4 (11.3)	43.1 (6.2)	64.1 (17.8)
Daily mean °F (°C)	33.6 (0.9)	36.8 (2.7)	42.3 (5.7)	47.1 (8.4)	55.6 (13.1)	64.1 (17.8)	72.8 (22.7)	70.8 (21.6)	63.5 (17.5)	51.8 (11.0)	40.5 (4.7)	33.4 (0.8)	51.0 (10.6)
Mean daily minimum °F (°C)	23.9 (−4.5)	26.4 (−3.1)	30.6 (−0.8)	34.7 (1.5)	42.2 (5.7)	49.0 (9.4)	56.9 (13.8)	54.6 (12.6)	47.6 (8.7)	37.2 (2.9)	28.5 (−1.9)	23.7 (−4.6)	37.9 (3.3)
Average precipitation inches (mm)	1.59 (40)	1.55 (39)	1.24 (31)	0.48 (12)	0.59 (15)	0.51 (13)	0.39 (9.9)	0.19 (4.8)	0.32 (8.1)	0.76 (19)	1.15 (29)	2.20 (56)	10.97 (276.8)
Average snowfall inches (cm)	4.0 (10)	3.1 (7.9)	2.5 (6.4)	0.6 (1.5)	0.1 (0.25)	0.0 (0.0)	0.0 (0.0)	0.0 (0.0)	0.0 (0.0)	0.0 (0.0)	1.0 (2.5)	5.4 (14)	16.7 (42.55)
Source: NOAA

== Demographics ==
Historical population
Census	Pop.	Note	%±
1870	1,035		—
1880	1,362		31.6%
1890	3,563		161.6%
1900	4,500		26.3%
1910	10,867		141.5%
1920	12,016		10.6%
1930	18,529		54.2%
1940	21,317		15.0%
1950	32,497		52.4%
1960	51,470		58.4%
1970	72,863		41.6%
1980	100,756		38.3%
1990	133,850		32.8%
2000	180,480		34.8%
2010	225,221		24.8%
2020	264,165		17.3%
2025 (est.)	283,621	▲	7.4%

Reno's population grew 17.3% from 2010 to 2020, more than twice the U.S. rate of 7.4%. By 2025, Reno had grown 26% since 2010, to more than 283,000 residents. The Los Angeles Times reported that much of the growth came from Californians drawn by lower housing costs and the region's technology industry.

=== 2020 census ===
Reno, Nevada – Racial and ethnic composition Note: the US Census treats Hispanic/Latino as an ethnic category. This table excludes Latinos from the racial categories and assigns them to a separate category. Hispanics/Latinos may be of any race.
Race / Ethnicity(NH = Non-Hispanic)	Pop 2000	Pop 2010	Pop 2020	% 2000	% 2010	% 2020
White alone (NH)	124,870	140,752	152,015	69.19%	62.50%	57.55%
Black or African American alone (NH)	4,414	5,990	7,575	2.45%	2.66%	2.87%
Native American or Alaska Native alone (NH)	1,772	2,066	1,881	0.98%	0.92%	0.71%
Asian alone (NH)	9,423	13,913	18,344	5.22%	6.18%	6.94%
Pacific Islander alone (NH)	971	1,505	1,917	0.54%	0.67%	0.73%
Other race alone (NH)	250	441	1,389	0.14%	0.20%	0.53%
Mixed race or Multiracial (NH)	4,164	5,914	14,064	2.31%	2.63%	5.32%
Hispanic or Latino (any race)	34,616	54,640	66,980	19.18%	24.26%	25.36%
Total	180,480	225,221	264,165	100.00%	100.00%	100.00%

As of the census of 2010, there were 225,221 people, 90,924 households, and 51,112 families residing in the city. The population density was 2,186.6 inhabitants per square mile (844.3/km^{2}). There were 102,582 housing units at an average density of 995.9 per square mile (384.5/km^{2}). The city's racial makeup was 74.2% White, 2.9% African American, 1.3% Native American, 6.3% Asian, 0.7% Pacific Islander, 10.5% some other race, and 4.2% from two or more races. Hispanic or Latino people of any race were 24.3% of the population. Non-Hispanic Whites were 62.5% of the population in 2010, down from 88.5% in 1980.

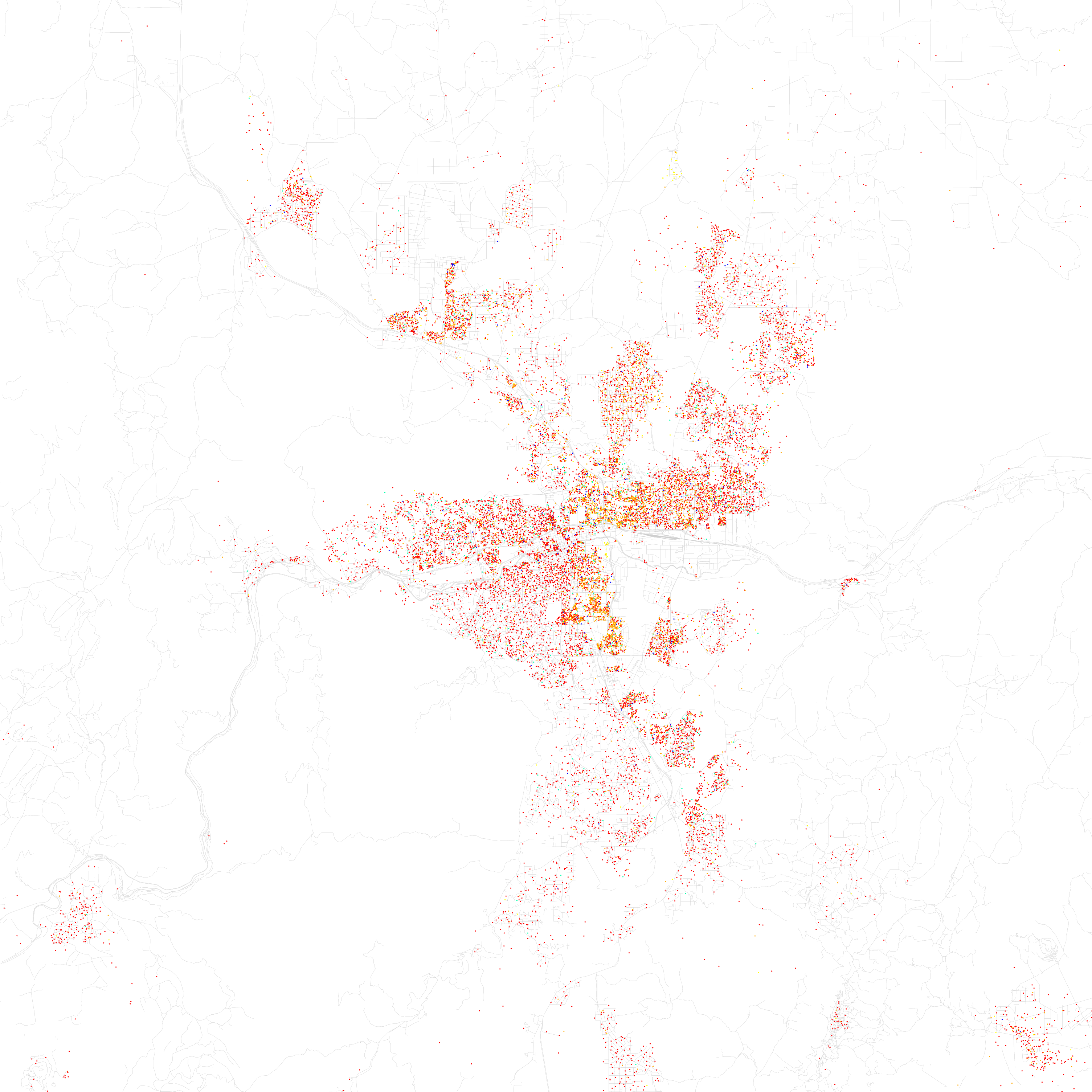
Map of racial distribution in Reno, 2010 U.S. Census. Each dot is 25 people: ⬤ White ⬤ Black ⬤ Asian ⬤ Hispanic ⬤ Other

At the 2010 census, there were 90,924 households, of which 29.8% had children under the age of 18 living with them, 38.4% were headed by married couples living together, 11.8% had a female householder with no husband present, and 43.8% were non-families. 32.1% of all households were made up of individuals, and 9.7% were someone living alone who was 65 years of age or older. The average household size was 2.43, and the average family size was 3.10.

In the city, the 2010 population was spread out, with 22.8% under the age of 18, 12.5% from 18 to 24, 28.2% from 25 to 44, 24.9% from 45 to 64, and 11.7% who were 65 years of age or older. The median age was 34.6 years. For every 100 females, there were 103.4 males. For every 100 females age 18 and over, there were 102.7 males.

In 2011, the city's estimated median household income was $44,846, and the median family income was $53,896. Males had a median income of $42,120 versus $31,362 for females. The city's per capita income was $25,041. About 9.6% of families and 14.4% of the population were below the poverty line, including 15.1% of those under age 18 and 12.8% of those age 65 or over. The population was 180,480 at the 2000 census; in 2010, its population had risen to 225,221, making it the third-largest city in the state after Las Vegas and Henderson, and the largest outside Clark County. Reno lies 26 miles (42 km) north of the Nevada state capital, Carson City, and 22 miles (35 km) northeast of Lake Tahoe in a shrub-steppe environment. Reno shares its eastern border with the city of Sparks and is the larger of the principal cities of the Reno–Sparks, Nevada Metropolitan Statistical Area (MSA), a metropolitan area that covers Storey and Washoe counties. The MSA had a combined population of 425,417 at the 2010 census.

There is an Italian-American community in Reno.

== Economy ==
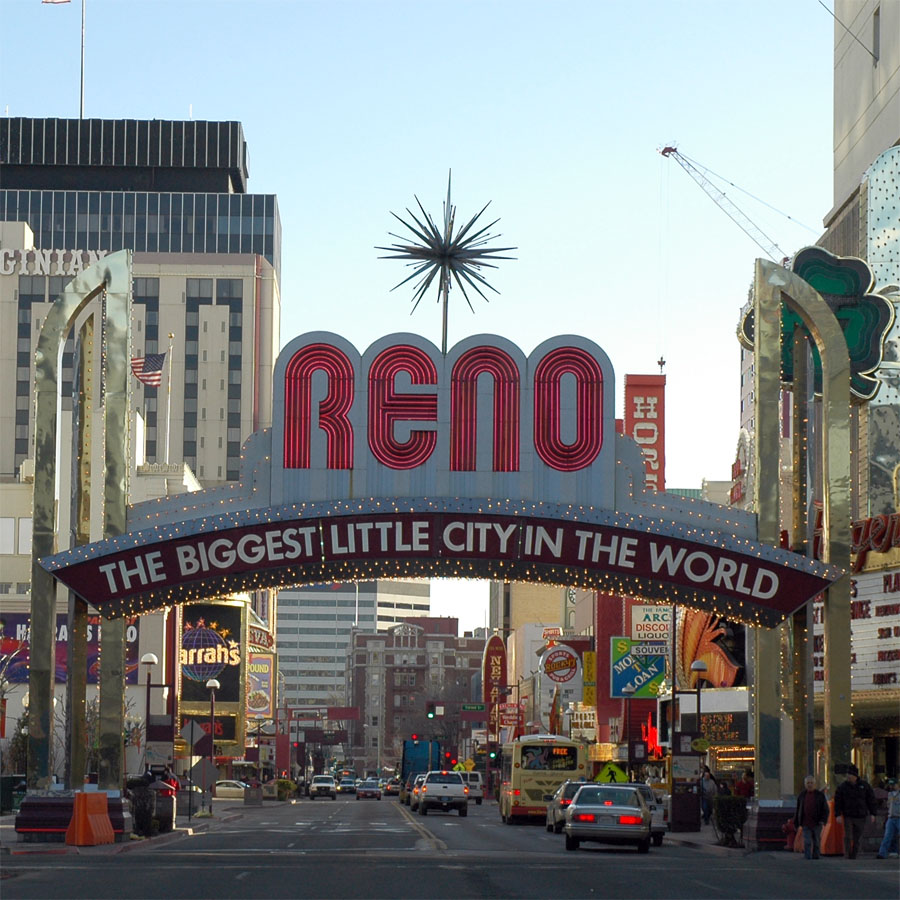
Downtown Reno, including the city's famous arch over Virginia Street

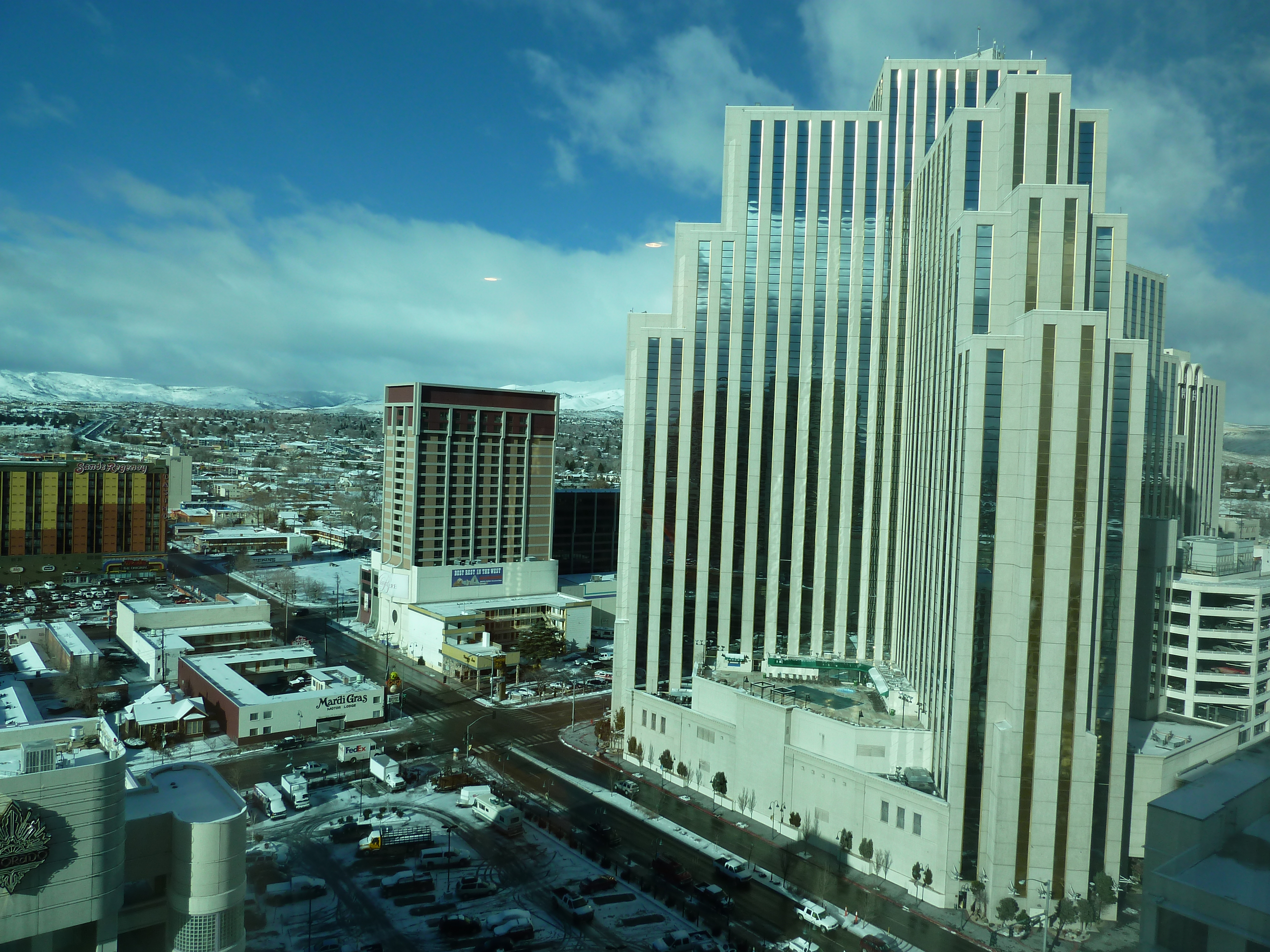
Silver Legacy Hotel with Downtown Reno in the background

Reno skyline in June 2006

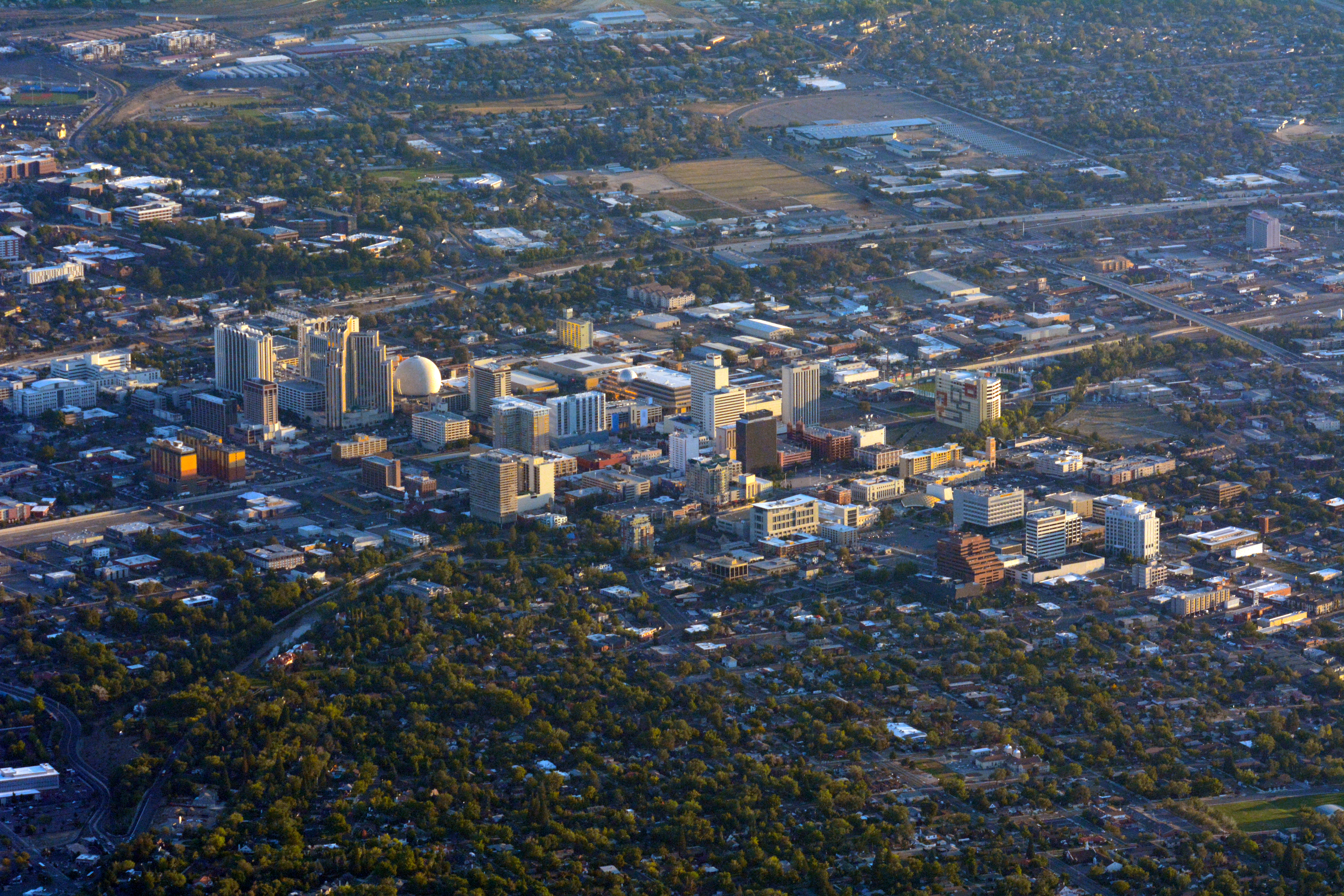
Reno skyline in September 2014

Until the 1960s, Reno was the gambling capital of the United States, but Las Vegas's rapid growth, American Airlines' 2000 buyout of Reno Air, and the growth of Native American gaming in California have reduced its gambling economy. Older casinos were torn down (Mapes Hotel, Fitzgerald's Nevada Club, Primadonna, Horseshoe Club, Harold's Club, Palace Club), the Flamingo Hilton and smaller casinos like the Comstock, Sundowner, Golden Phoenix, Kings Inn, Money Tree, Virginian, and Riverboat were either closed or were converted into residential units.

Because of its location, Reno has traditionally drawn the majority of its California tourists and gamblers from the San Francisco Bay Area and Sacramento while Las Vegas has historically served more tourists from Southern California and the Phoenix area.

Several large local hotel casinos have shown significant growth and have moved gaming further away from the downtown core. These larger hotel casinos are the Atlantis, the Peppermill, and the Grand Sierra Resort. The Peppermill was chosen as the most outstanding Reno gaming/hotel property by Casino Player and Nevada magazines. In 2005, the Peppermill Reno began a $300 million Tuscan-themed expansion.

Reno holds several events throughout the year to draw tourists to the area. They include Hot August Nights (a classic car convention), Street Vibrations (a motorcycle fan gathering and rally), the Great Reno Balloon Race, a Cinco de Mayo celebration, and bowling tournaments (held in the National Bowling Stadium).

Several large commercial developments were constructed during the mid-2000s boom, such as The Summit in 2007 and Legends at Sparks Marina in 2008.

Reno is the location of the corporate headquarters for several companies, including Braeburn Capital, Hamilton, Server Technology, EE Technologies, Caesars Entertainment, ITS Logistics, and Port of Subs. Companies based in the Reno metropolitan area include Sierra Nevada Corporation and U.S. Ordnance. International Game Technology, Bally Technologies and GameTech have a development and manufacturing presence.

Other companies headquartered in Reno include Ormat Technologies, a geothermal company, Figure Technology Solutions, a financial technology company, and American Battery Technology Company, which develops methods for recycling batteries and extracting battery metals. Positron AI, based in Reno, develops chips for artificial intelligence. In 2026, it raised $230 million in a financing round that valued the company at $1 billion.

Since the turn of the 21st century, Greater Reno saw an influx of technology companies entering the area, following major initiatives and investments by investors from Seattle & the Bay Area. The first one in 1999 was Amazon in Fernley. After the Great Recession, the state placed an increased focus on economic development. Thousands of new jobs were created.

The Tesla Gigafactory at the Tahoe Reno Industrial Center is one of the largest buildings in the country, purportedly covering 5.8 million square feet. Although it was originally Tesla's largest factory, it's since been superseded by Gigafactory Texas, which has 10 million square feet. It employs roughly 11,000 people, making Tesla larger than any employer in the city of Reno, though the Industrial Center is located just outside of the city. In 2023 Tesla announced a $3.6 billion expansion of the facility that would incorporate an additional four million square feet, including an all-new plant for Semis and a much larger one for battery development. In 2023, the expansion was projected to create approximately 3,000 new jobs.

The arrival of several data centers at the Tahoe Reno Industrial Center is further diversifying a region that was best known for distribution and logistics outside gaming and tourism. Switch's new SUPERNAP campus at the Tahoe Reno Industrial Center is shaping up to be the largest data center in the world once completed. Apple is expanding its data center at the adjacent Reno Technology Park and recently built a warehouse on land in downtown Reno.

The greater Reno area also hosts distribution facilities for Amazon, Walmart, PetSmart and Zulily.

=== Top employers ===
According to Reno's 2025 Fiscal Year Annual Comprehensive Financial Report, the top employers in the city are:

#	Employer	Average Employees
1	Washoe County School District	7,500
2	Renown Regional Medical Center	7,500
3	Peppermill Reno	3,000
4	Grand Sierra Resort	3,000
5	St. Mary's Regional Medical Center	3,000
6	Eldorado Resort Casino	3,000
7	Silver Legacy Resort Casino	3,000
8	University of Nevada, Reno	3,000
9	U-Haul Holding Company	3,000
10	Circus Circus Reno	3,000

== Healthcare ==
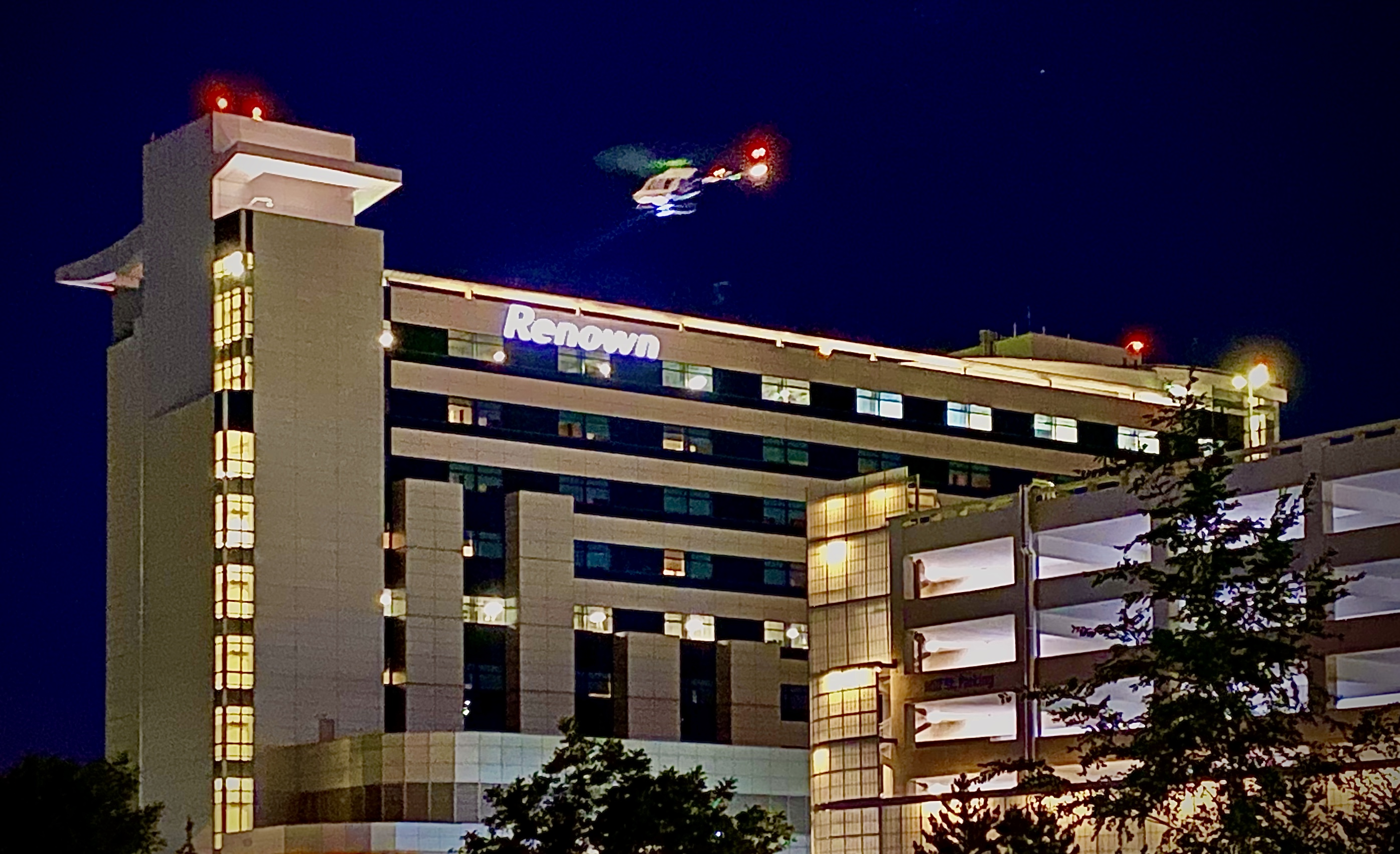
Night arrival of medical transport helicopter at Renown Regional Medical Center

Reno has several healthcare facilities. Many are affiliated with the University of Nevada Reno School of Medicine.

- Northern Nevada Medical Center
- Northern Nevada Sierra Medical Center
- Renown Regional Medical Center
- Reno-Sparks Tribal Health Center
- Saint Mary's Regional Medical Center
- University of Nevada Reno School of Medicine
- Veterans Administration Sierra Nevada Healthcare System Reno, Nevada

== Arts and culture ==
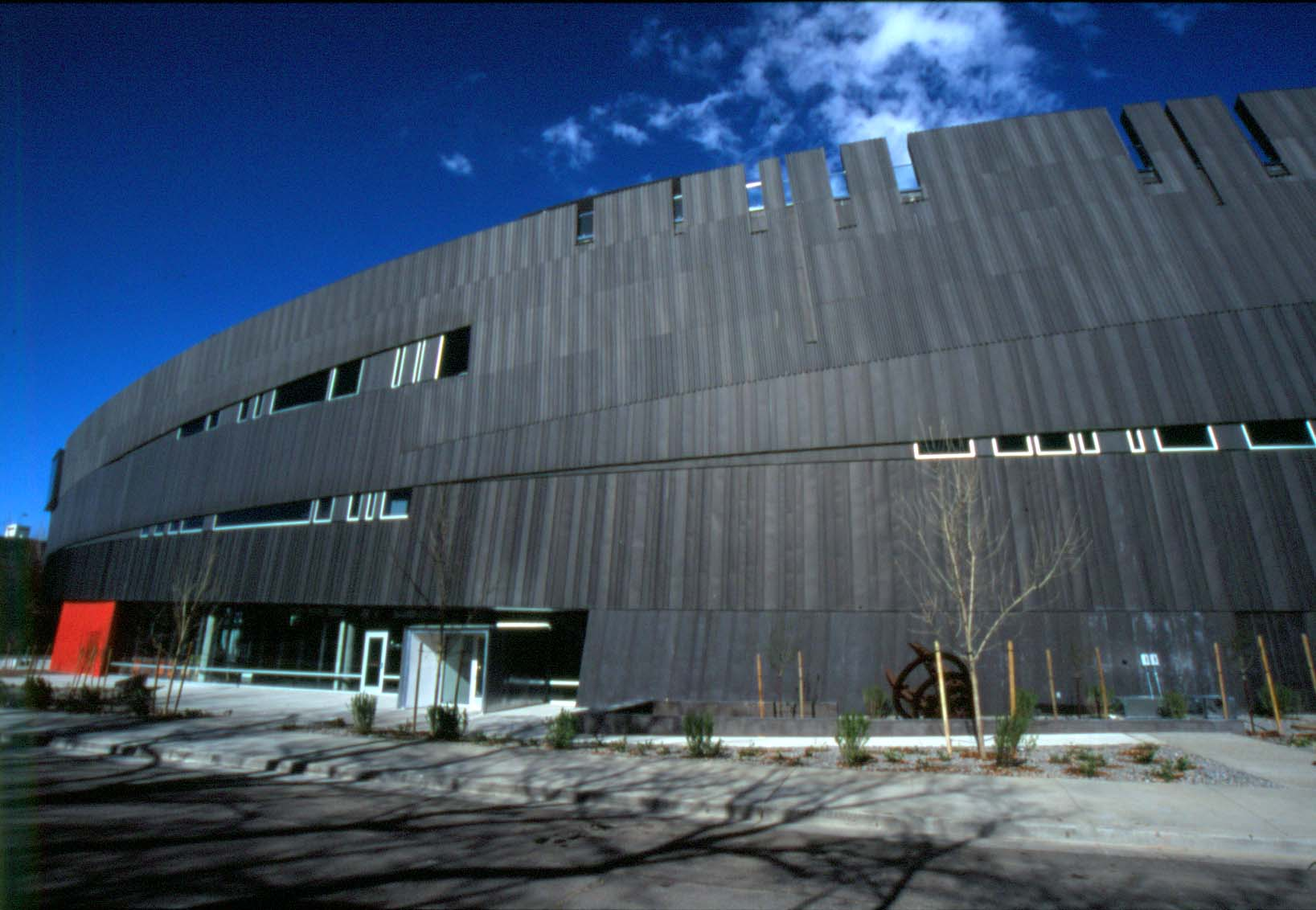
Exterior of Nevada Museum of Art

Reno has several museums. The Nevada Museum of Art is the only American Alliance of Museums (AAM) accredited art museum in Nevada and the largest collection of Land art. The National Automobile Museum contains 200 cars that were from the collection of William F. Harrah, including Elvis Presley's 1973 Cadillac Eldorado.

Reno also hosts several music venues, such as the Pioneer Center for the Performing Arts, the Reno Philharmonic Orchestra, and the Reno Pops Orchestra. The Reno Youth Symphony Orchestra (YSO), affiliated with the Reno Philharmonic, gives talented youth the opportunity to play advanced music and perform nationwide. In 2016, they had the honor of performing at Carnegie Hall. A.V.A. Ballet Theatre is the resident ballet company of the Pioneer Center for the Performing Arts. All of their classical performances are with the Reno Philharmonic Orchestra.

Every July, Reno celebrates Artown, a visual and performing arts festival that lasts the entire month of July throughout the city. Along with performances, Artown partners with other institutions throughout the Reno Tahoe area to hold workshops, camps, and classes for all ages. All events are free of charge or low cost.

The Reno Rodeo began in 1919 as the "Nevada Round-Up" and took its current name in 1935. For decades during rodeo week, members of the Reno Junior Chamber of Commerce drove through downtown in a paddy wagon called the "Black Maria". They picked up people who were not wearing Western clothes and brought them before a mock court, whose penalties raised money for charity. The modern event runs for ten days and draws an estimated 140,000 spectators. In 2026, KTVN reported that the organization had around 900 active volunteers, who worked throughout the year and contributed tens of thousands of hours annually, while it employed about 15 people.

In August, the festival Hot August Nights is a major car festival in Reno across the city.

Each September, Reno hosts Northern Nevada Pride.

The Great Reno Balloon Race, also held each September, is the world's largest free balloon race.

Reno has a public library, a branch of the Washoe County Library System. The Downtown branch of the Washoe County Library was listed on the National Register of Historic Places in 2013.

== Sports ==
Reno Events Center

Reno is home to the Reno Aces, the minor league baseball Triple-A affiliate of the Arizona Diamondbacks, playing in Greater Nevada Field, a downtown ballpark opened in 2009. Reno has hosted multiple professional baseball teams in the past, most under the Reno Silver Sox name. The Reno Astros, a former professional, unaffiliated baseball team, played at Moana Stadium until 2009.

In basketball, the Reno Bighorns of the NBA G League played at the Reno Events Center from 2008 to 2018. They were primarily an affiliate of the Sacramento Kings throughout its existence. The Sacramento Kings bought the team in 2016 and moved the franchise to become the Stockton Kings in 2018.

Reno is host to both amateur and professional combat sporting events such as mixed martial arts and boxing. The "Fight of the Century" between Jack Johnson and James J. Jeffries was held in Reno in 1910. Boxer Ray Mancini fought four of his last five fights in Reno against Bobby Chacon, Livingstone Bramble, Héctor Camacho and Greg Haugen.

Reno expected to be the future home of an ECHL ice hockey team, named the Reno Raiders, but construction on a suitable arena never began. The franchise was dormant since 1998, when it was named the Reno Rage, and earlier the Reno Renegades, and played in the now-defunct West Coast Hockey League (WCHL). In 2016, Reno was removed from the ECHL's Future Markets page.

The Reno–Tahoe Open is northern Nevada's only PGA Tour event, held at Montrêux Golf & Country Club in Reno. As part of the FedEx Cup, the tournament follows 132 PGA Tour professionals competing for a share of the event's $3 million purse. The Reno-Tahoe Open Foundation has donated more than $1.8 million to local charities.

Reno has a college sports scene, with the Nevada Wolf Pack appearing in football bowl games and an Associated Press and Coaches Poll Top Ten ranking in basketball in 2018.

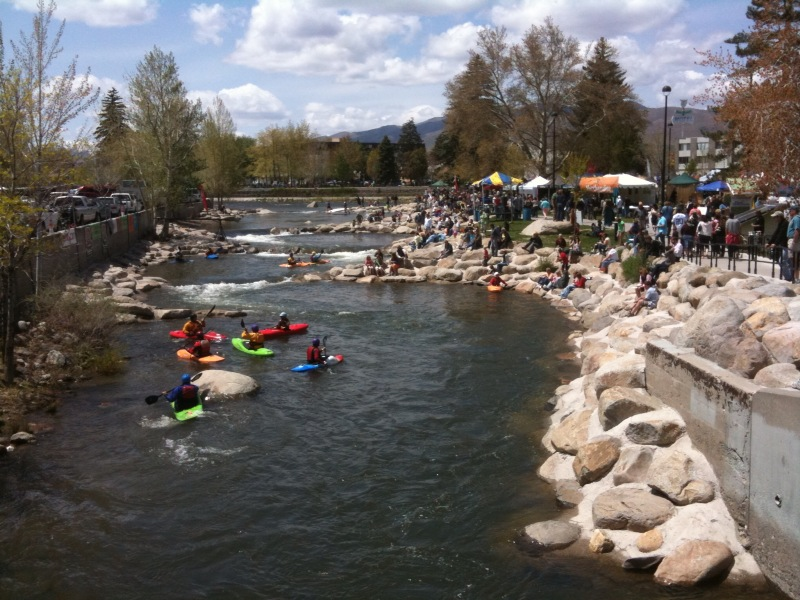
Reno Whitewater Festival at the whitewater park in Reno

In 2004, the city completed a $1.5 million whitewater park on the Truckee River in downtown Reno, which hosts whitewater events throughout the year. The course runs Class 2 and 3 rapids with year-round public access. The 1,400-foot (430 m) north channel features more aggressive rapids, drop pools, and "holes" for rodeo kayak-type maneuvers. The milder 1,200 ft (370 m) south channel is set up as a kayak slalom course and a beginner area.

Reno is home to two roller derby teams, the Battle Born Derby Demons and the Reno Roller Girls. The Battle Born Derby Demons compete on flat tracks locally and nationally. They are the only Derby team locally to compete in a national Derby league.

Reno is the home of the National Bowling Stadium, which hosts the United States Bowling Congress (USBC) Open Championships every three years.

=== List of teams ===
==== Minor professional teams ====
Team	Sport	League	Venue (capacity)	Established	Titles
Reno Aces	Baseball	MiLB (AAA-PCL)	Greater Nevada Field (9,013)	2009	2
Nevada Storm	Women's football	WFA	Damonte Ranch High School (N/A); Fernley High School (N/A); Galena High School (N/A)	2008	2

==== Amateur teams ====
Team	Sport	League	Venue (capacity)	Established	Titles
Reno Ice Raiders	Ice hockey	MWHL	Reno Ice	2015	0
Nevada Coyotes FC	Soccer	UPSL	Rio Vista Sports Complex (N/A)	2016	0

==== College teams ====
School	Team	League	Division	Primary conference
University of Nevada, Reno (UNR)	Nevada Wolf Pack	NCAA	NCAA Division I	Mountain West
Western Nevada College (WNC)	WNC Wildcats	NJCAA	NJCAA Division I	Scenic West

== Parks and recreation ==
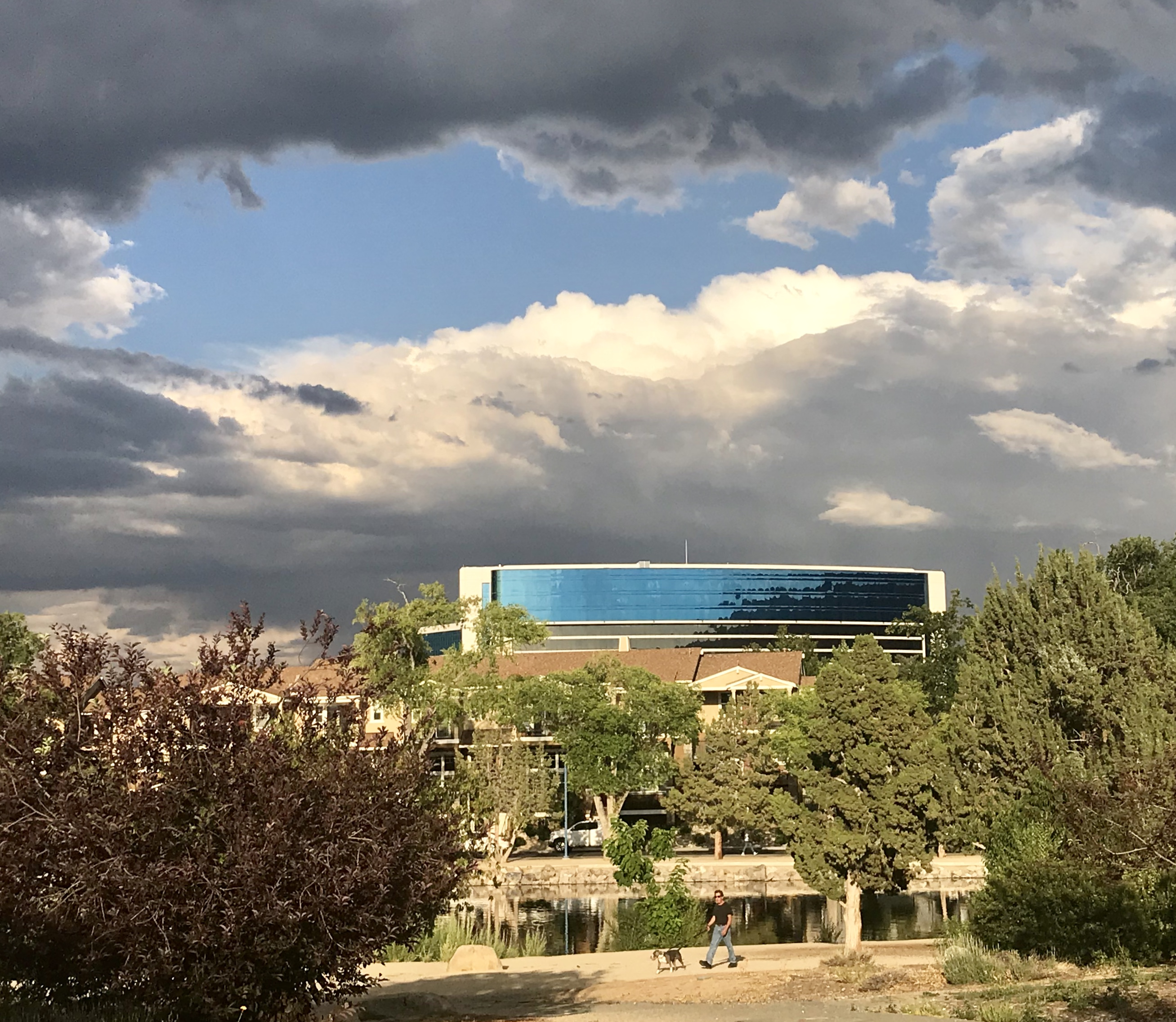
Virginia Lake is a popular place for people to walk their dog in Reno.

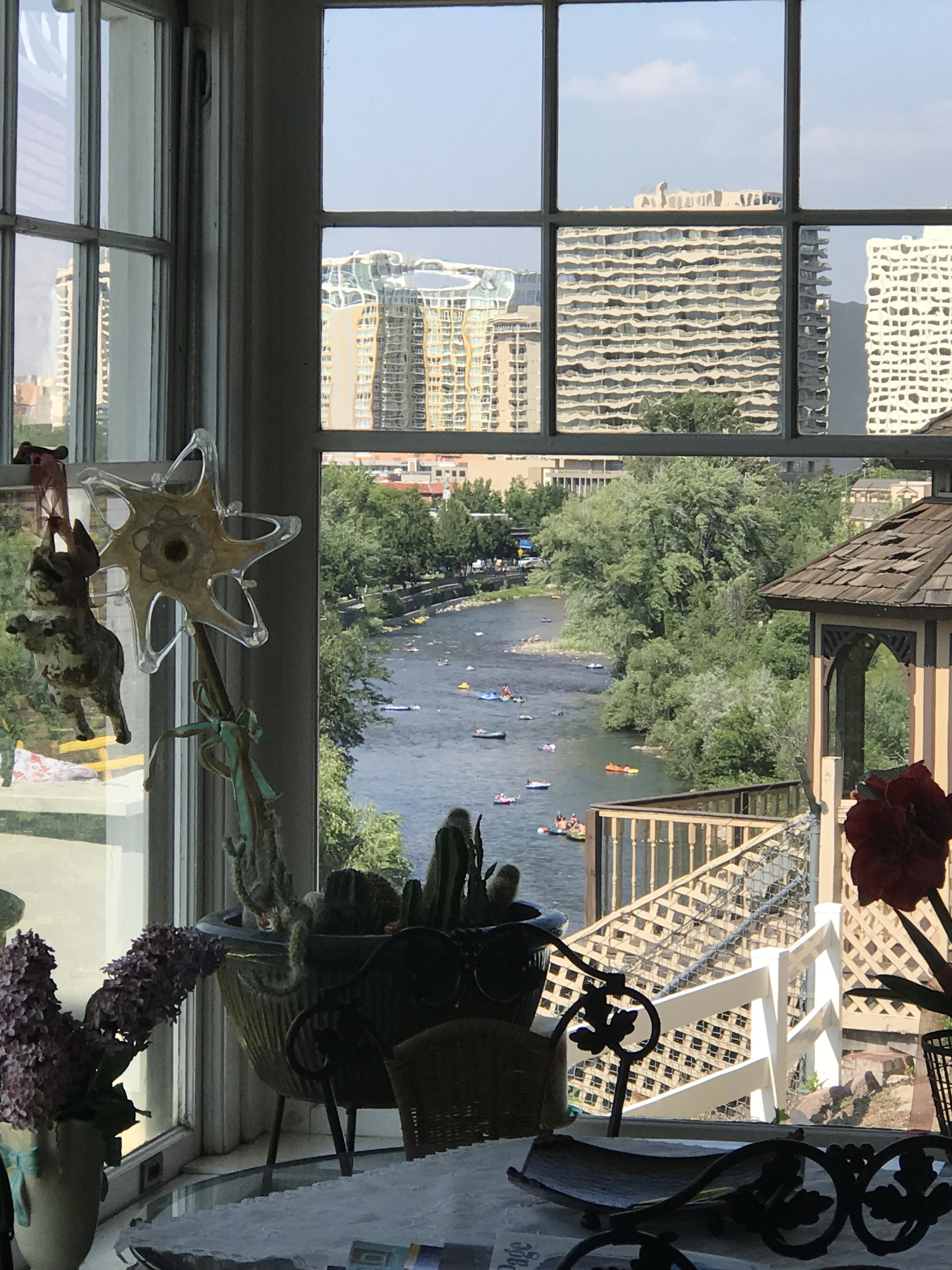
River rafting on the 4th of July, 2018 on the Truckee River

Reno is home to a variety of recreational activities, including both seasonal and year-round. In the summer, Reno locals can be found near three major bodies of water: Lake Tahoe, the Truckee River, and Pyramid Lake. The Truckee River originates at Lake Tahoe and flows west to east through the center of downtown Reno before terminating at Pyramid Lake to the north. The river is a major part of Artown, held in the summer at Wingfield Park. Washoe Lake is a popular kite and windsurfing location because of its high wind speeds during the summer.

Skiing and snowboarding are among the most popular winter sports and draw many tourists. There are 18 ski resorts (8 major resorts) as close as 11 miles (18 km) and as far as 98 miles (158 km) from the Reno–Tahoe International Airport, including Northstar California, Sierra-at-Tahoe, Alpine Meadows, Palisades Tahoe, Sugar Bowl, Diamond Peak, Heavenly Mountain, and Mount Rose. Other popular Reno winter activities include snowshoeing, ice skating, and snowmobiling. There are many bike paths to ride in the summertime. Lake Tahoe hosts international bike competitions each summer.

=== Air races ===
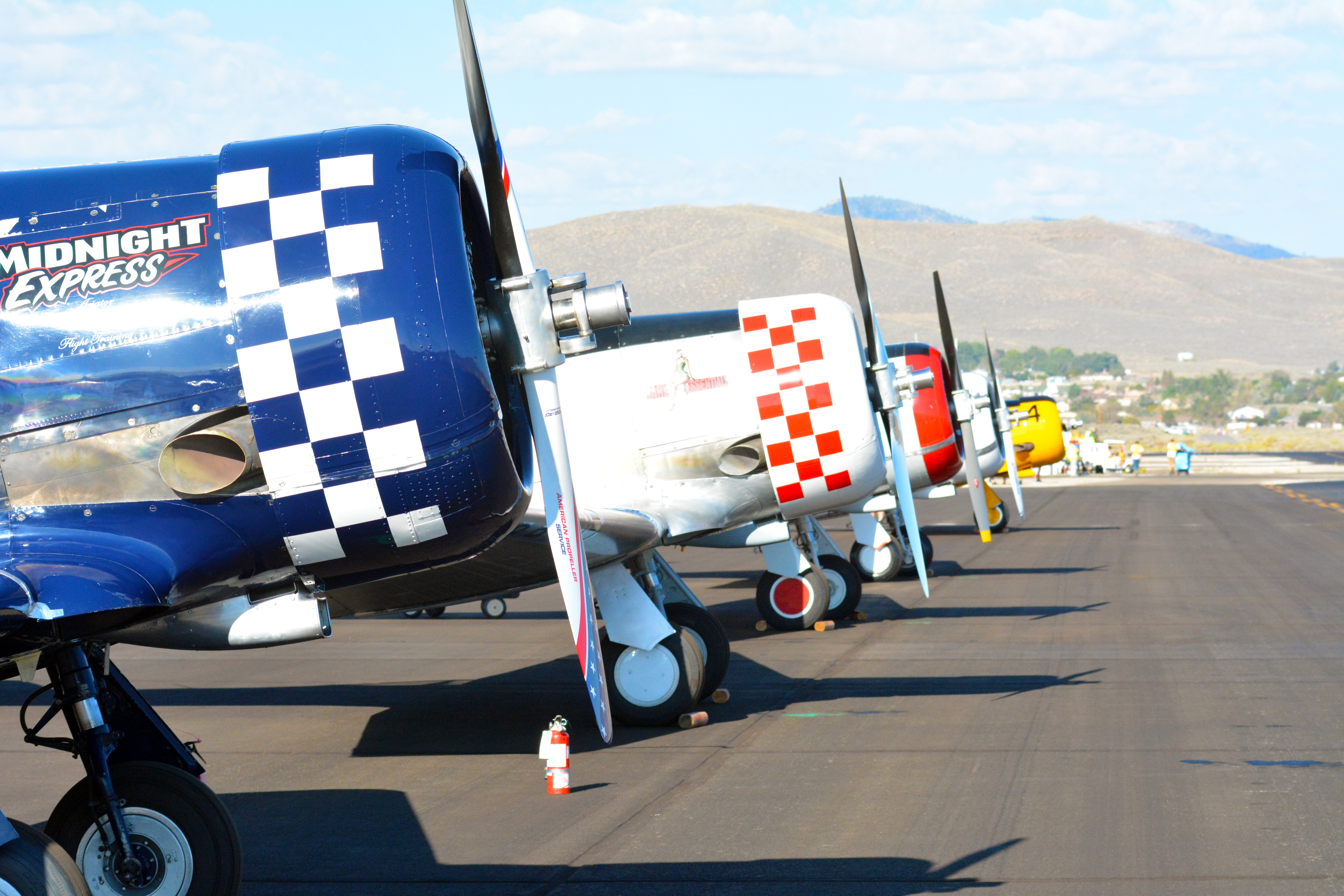
T6s line up for the 2014 Reno Air Races

The Reno Air Races, also known as the National Championship Air Races, are held each September at the Reno Stead Airport. After 60 years, the Reno Air Races were discontinued following 2023. The Reno Tahoe Airport Authority cited airport expansion and development as factors in the decision to end the event. Authority's decision to sundown the event, citing growth around the airport, amongst other nonspecific concerns not stated by the RTAA.

== Government ==
Reno has a democratic municipal government. The city council is the core of the government, with seven members. Six council members represent districts, with the mayor serving as the at-large representative. In 2023, the city restructured from five districts and two at-large seats to six districts and one at-large seat. In general, the top two vote earners in each ward make the ballot for the citywide election. The mayor serves as the at-large member representing the entire city. A second at-large position existed until the creation of the city’s sixth ward in 2023. The council has several duties, including setting priorities for the city, promoting communication with the public, planning development, and redevelopment.

There is an elected city attorney who is responsible for civil and criminal cases. The City Attorney represents the city government in court and prosecutes misdemeanors.

The city's charter calls for a council-manager form of government, meaning the council appoints only two positions: the city manager, who implements and enforces the policies and programs the council approves, and the city clerk. The city manager is in charge of the budget and workforce for all city programs. The city clerk, who records the proceedings of the council, makes appointments for the council, and makes sure efficient copying and printing services are available.

In 2010, there was a ballot question asking whether the Reno city government and the Washoe County government should explore the idea of becoming one combined governmental body. Fifty-four percent of voters approved of the ballot measure to inquire into consolidating the governments.

=== Fire department ===
The Reno Fire Department (RFD) operates 15 fire stations.

The RFD provides all-risk emergency service to the City of Reno residents. All-risk emergency service is the national model of municipal fire departments, providing the services needed in the most efficient way possible.

The department provides paramedic-level service to the citizens and visitors of Reno.

In addition to responding to fires, the fire department also provides rescue capabilities for almost any type of emergency. This includes emergency medical care for the citizens, a hazardous materials team capable of identifying unknown materials and controlling a release disaster, and management of large-scale incidents.

== Education ==
=== Universities and colleges ===
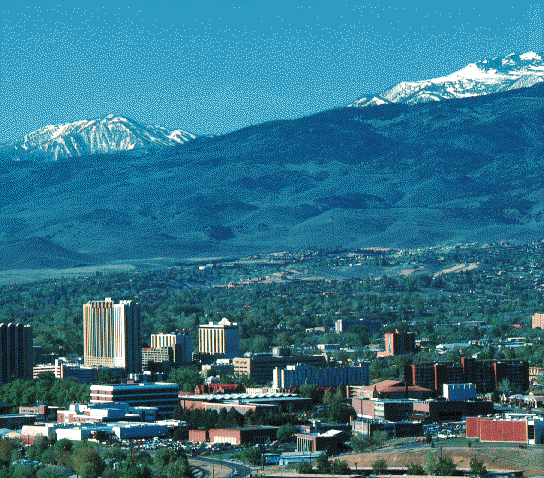
An older picture showing part of the University of Nevada, Reno campus in the foreground

- The University of Nevada, Reno is the oldest university in Nevada and the Nevada System of Higher Education. In 1886, the state university, previously only a college preparatory school, moved from Elko in remote northeastern Nevada to north of downtown Reno, where it became a full-fledged state college. The university grew slowly over the decades, but it now has an enrollment of 21,353, with most students from within Nevada. Its specialties include mining engineering, agriculture, journalism, business, and one of only two Basque Studies programs in the nation. It houses the National Judicial College.
- Truckee Meadows Community College (TMCC) is a regionally accredited, two-year institution that is part of the Nevada System of Higher Education. The college has approximately 13,000 students attending classes at a primary campus and four satellite centers. It offers a wide range of academic and university transfer programs, occupational training, career enhancement workshops, and other classes. TMCC offers associate of arts, associate of science, associate of applied science, or associate of general studies degrees, one-year certificates, or certificates of completion in more than 50 career fields, including architecture, auto/diesel mechanics, criminal justice, dental hygiene, graphic design, musical theatre, nursing, and welding.
- The Nevada School of Law at Old College in Reno was the first law school established in the state of Nevada. Its doors were open from 1981 to 1988.
- Carrington College, a for-profit institution, maintains a campus in Reno. The school serves 500 students across three fields of study in the healthcare professions.

=== Public schools ===
Public education is provided by the Washoe County School District.

- Reno has twelve public high schools: Damonte Ranch, Galena, Hug, North Valleys High School, McQueen, Academy of Arts, Careers, and Technology (AACT), Reno, Truckee Meadows Community College High School, Innovations, Wooster and Debbie Smith Career and Technical Education Academy, just opening for the 2025-2026 school year.
- There are three public high schools in neighboring Sparks, attended by many students who live in Reno: Reed, Spanish Springs, and Sparks High School.
- Reno-Sparks has 15 middle schools: Billinghurst, Archie Clayton, Cold Springs, Depoali, Dilworth, Herz, Mendive, O'Brien, Pine, Shaw, Sky Ranch, Sparks, Swope, Traner, and Vaughn.
- Reno-Sparks has 65 elementary schools: Allen, Anderson, Beasley, Jessie Beck, Bennett, Booth, Brown, Cannan, Caughlin Ranch, Corbett, Desert Heights, Diedrichsen, Dodson, Donner Springs, Double Diamond, Drake, Duncan, Katherine Dunn, Elmcrest, Gomes, Grace Warner, Greenbrae, Hidden Valley, Huffaker, Hunsberger, Hunter Lake, John C Bohach, Johnson, Juniper, Lemmon Valley, Elizabeth Lenz, Lincoln Park, Echo Loder, Mathews, Maxwell, Melton, Mitchell, Moss, Mount Rose, Natchez, Palmer, Peavine, Picollo Special Education School, Pleasant Valley, Risley, Roy Gomm, Sepulveda, Sierra Vista, Silver Lake, Alice Smith, Kate Smith, Smithridge, Spanish Springs, Stead, Sun Valley, Taylor, Towles, Van Gorder, Verdi [pronounced VUR-die], Veterans Memorial, Warner, Westergard, Whitehead, and Sarah Winnemucca. (some schools included on this list are in Sparks)

=== Public charter schools ===
Reno has many charter schools, which include Academy for Career Education (ACE High School), serving grades 10–12, opened 2002; Alpine Academy Charter High School, serving grades 9–12, opened 2009; Bailey Charter Elementary School, serving grades K-6, opened 2001; Coral Academy of Science, serving grades K-12; Davidson Academy, serving grades 6–12, opened 2006; Doral Academy of Northern Nevada, serving grades K-8; High Desert Montessori School, serving grades PreK-7, opened 2002; I Can Do Anything Charter School, serving grades 9–12, opened 2000; Mariposa Language and Learning Academy, serving grades K-5; Mater Academy of Northern Nevada, serving grades K-8; Pinecrest Academy of Northern Nevada, serving grades K-8; Rainshadow Community Charter High School, serving grades 9–12, opened 2003; Sierra Nevada Academy Charter School, serving grades PreK-8, opened 1999; and TEAM A (Together Everyone Achieves More Academy), serving grades 9–12, opened 2004.

=== Private schools ===
Reno has a few private elementary schools such as Legacy Christian School, Excel Christian School, St. Nicholas Orthodox Academy, Lamplight Christian School, and Nevada Sage Waldorf School as well as private high schools, the largest of which are Bishop Manogue High School and Sage Ridge School.

== Transportation ==
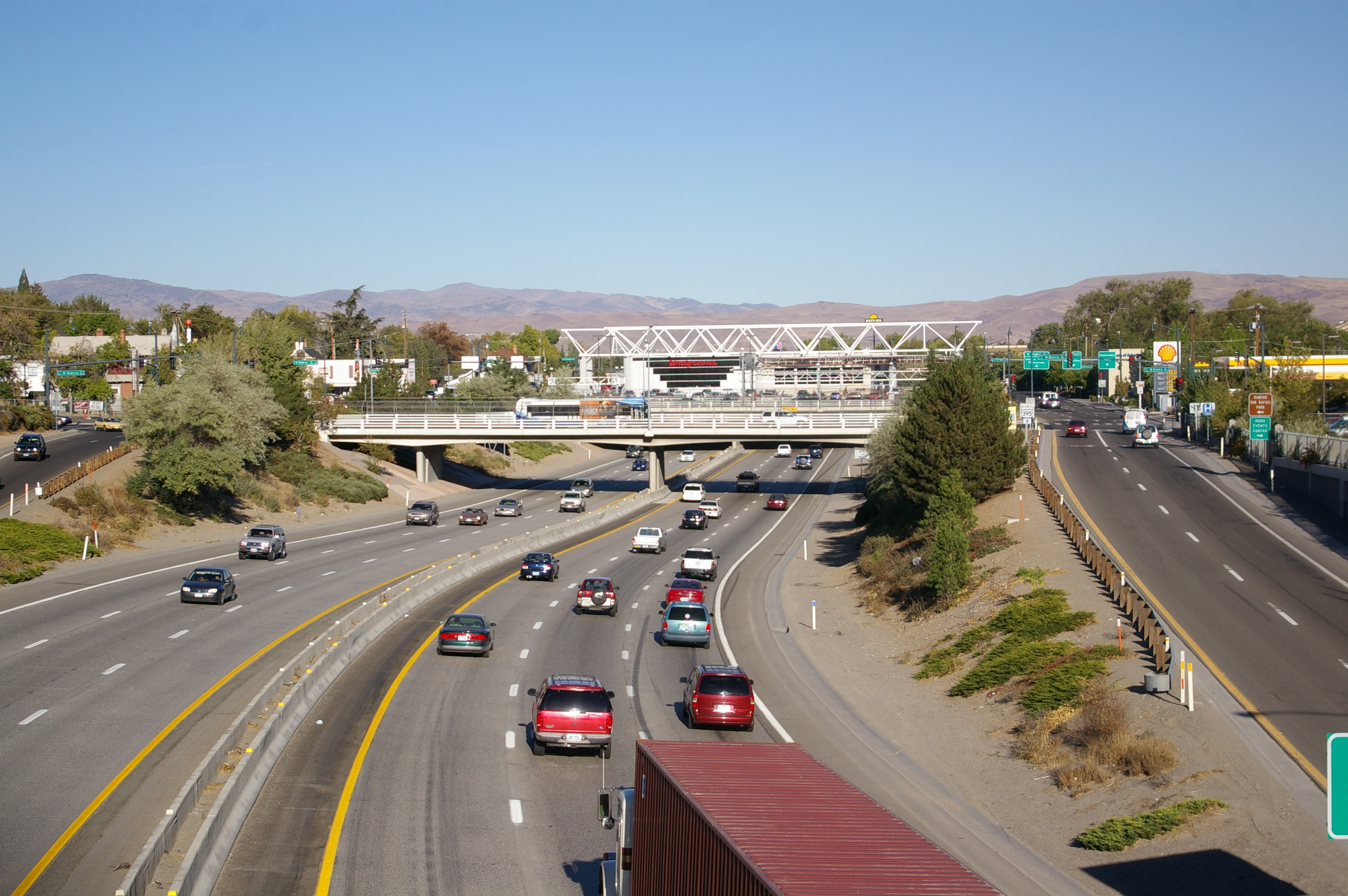
I-80 in Downtown Reno

=== Roads ===
Reno was historically served by the Victory Highway and a branch of the Lincoln Highway. After the formation of the U.S. Numbered Highways system, U.S. Route 40 was routed along 4th Street through downtown Reno, before being replaced by Interstate 80. The primary north–south highway through Reno is U.S. Route 395/Interstate 580.

=== Bus ===
The Regional Transportation Commission of Washoe County (RTC) has a bus system that provides intracity buses, intercity buses to Carson City, and an on-demand shuttle service for disabled persons. The system has its main terminal on 4th Street in downtown Reno and secondary terminals in Sparks and at Meadowood Mall in south Reno.

Numerous shuttle and excursion services are offered connecting the Reno–Tahoe International Airport to various destinations:

- North Lake Tahoe Express provides connecting shuttle service to North Lake Tahoe Resorts
- South Tahoe Airporter provides connecting shuttle service to South Lake Tahoe resorts.
- Eastern Sierra Transit Authority provides shuttles to destinations south along the US-395 corridor in California, such as Mammoth Mountain and Lancaster
- Modoc Sage Stage provides shuttles to Alturas and Susanville, California, along the northern US-395 corridor.
- Salt Lake Express provides service to Las Vegas mainly along the southern US-95 corridor.

Greyhound stops at a downtown terminal. Megabus stopped at the Silver Legacy Reno, but has since discontinued service to Reno.

=== Rail ===
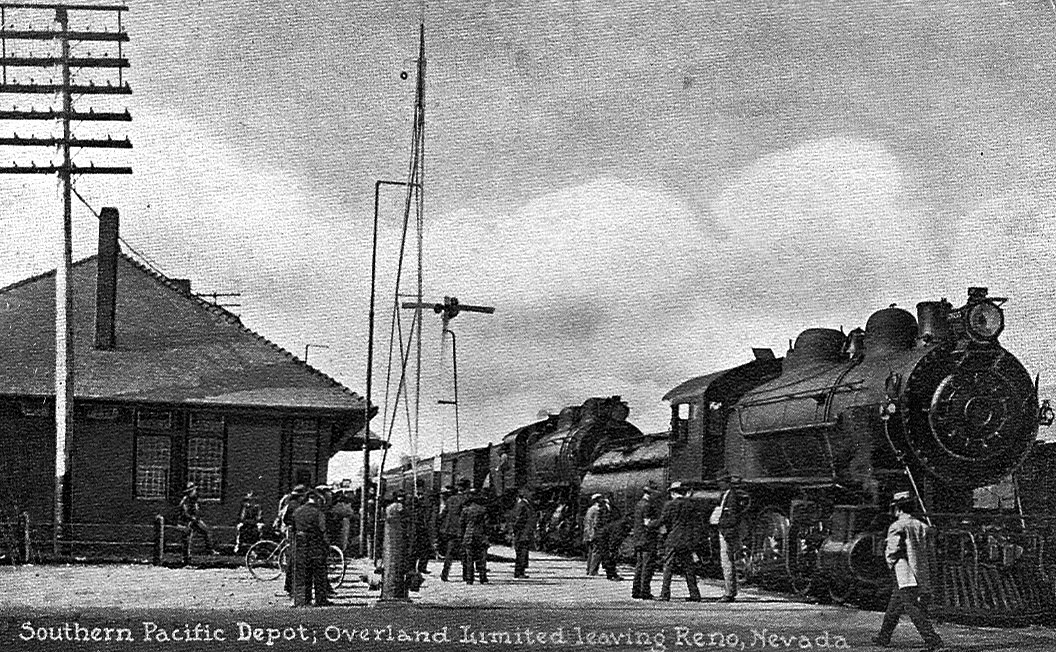
The Overland Limited at Reno in 1913

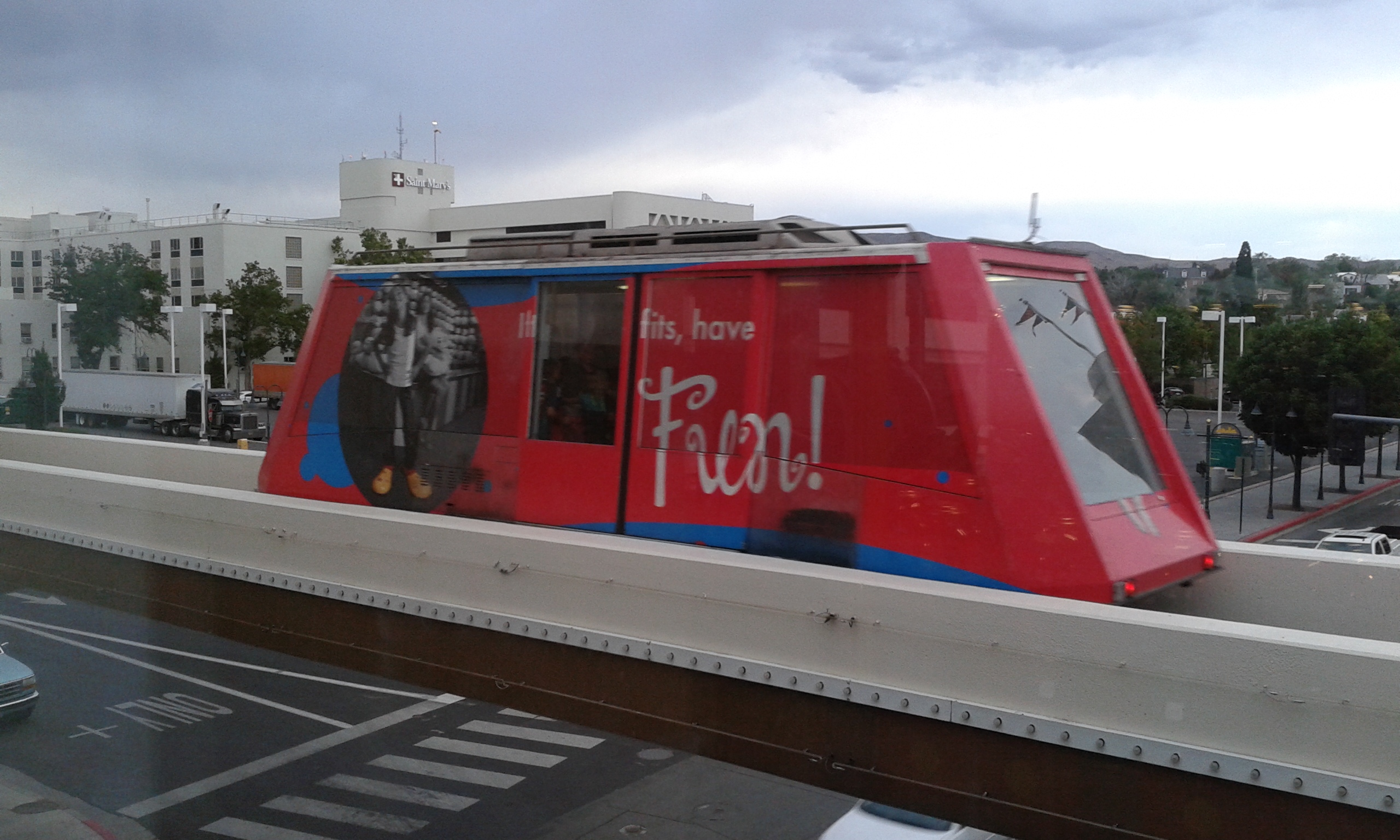
The tram at Circus Circus Reno

Reno was historically a stopover along the First transcontinental railroad; the modern Overland Route continues to run through Reno. Reno was additionally the southern terminus of the Nevada–California–Oregon Railway (NCO) and the northern terminus of the Virginia and Truckee Railroad. Using the NCO depot and right of way, the Western Pacific Railroad also provided rail service to Reno. In the early 20th century, Reno also had a modest streetcar system. Downtown Reno has two historic train depots, the inactive Nevada-California-Oregon Railroad Depot and the active Amtrak depot at Reno station, originally built by the Southern Pacific Railroad.

Amtrak provides daily passenger service to Reno via the California Zephyr at Reno station and via multiple Amtrak Thruway buses that connect to trains departing from Sacramento.

=== Air ===
The city is served by Reno–Tahoe International Airport, with general aviation traffic handled by Reno Stead Airport. Reno–Tahoe International Airport is the second busiest commercial airport in the state of Nevada after Harry Reid International Airport in Las Vegas. Reno was the hub and headquarters of the defunct airline Reno Air.

== Utilities ==
The Truckee Meadows Water Authority provides potable water for the city. The Truckee River is the primary water source. It supplies Reno with 80 million U.S. gallons (300 Ml) of water a day during the summer, and 40 million U.S. gallons (150 Ml) of water per day in the winter. The two water treatment plants are Chalk Bluff and Glendale. The Chalk Bluff plant's main intakes are west of Reno and south of Verdi, with the water flowing through a series of flumes and ditches to the plant. Alternative intakes are below the plant along the banks of the Truckee River itself. The Glendale plant is alongside the river, and is fed by a rock and concrete rubble diversion dam a short distance upstream.

Sewage treatment for most of the Truckee Meadows region takes place at the Truckee Meadows Water Reclamation Facility at the eastern edge of the valley. Treated effluent returns to the Truckee River by way of Steamboat Creek, which also receives water from the historic Steamboat Ditch. In the 1990s, this capacity was increased from 20 to 30 million U.S. gallons (70 to 110 million liters) per day. While treated, the effluent contains suspended solids, nitrogen, and phosphorus, aggravating water-quality concerns of the river and its receiving waters of Pyramid Lake. Local agencies working with the Environmental Protection Agency have developed several watershed management strategies to accommodate this expanded discharge. To accomplish this successful outcome, the DSSAM Model was developed and calibrated for the Truckee River to analyze the most cost-effective available management strategy set.

NV Energy, formerly Sierra Pacific, provides electric power and natural gas. Power comes from multiple sources, including Tracy-Clark Station to the east, and the Steamboat Springs binary cycle power plants at the southern end of town.

== In popular culture ==
Movies filmed in Reno include:

- The Cooler
- Magnolia
- Hard Eight
- Charley Varrick
- Into the Wild
- Desert Hearts
- The Wizard
- Jinxed!
- The Misfits
- Kingpin
- ...All the Marbles
- Pink Cadillac
- Diamonds
- Sister Act
- Father's Day
- Waking Up in Reno
- Austin Powers in Goldmember
- California Split
- Up Close & Personal
- The Pledge
- Kill Me Again
- The Last Don
- Ocean's Eleven
- Andy Hardy's Blonde Trouble
- Blind Fury
- Mr. Belvedere Goes to College
- Scarecrow
- Born to Kill
- The Muppets

Reno is featured as New Reno in the post-apocalyptic role-playing game Fallout 2. The final two episodes of Knuckles feature Reno and were partly filmed in the city.

Reno is referenced in several well-known songs. In Johnny Cash's "Folsom Prison Blues", the narrator claims to have "shot a man in Reno"; the Grateful Dead's "Friend of the Devil" opens with its narrator fleeing the city; and R.E.M. released "All the Way to Reno (You're Gonna Be a Star)" in 2001. In 2025, Miyeon of I-dle released the song "Reno", featuring South Korean singer Colde.

Reno 911! is a mockumentary-style comedy television series set in Reno and following the fictional Reno Sheriff's Department.

== Twin towns – sister cities ==
Reno's sister cities are:

- San Sebastián, Spain
- Taichung, Taiwan
- Udon Thani, Thailand
- Wirral, England
- Nalchik, Russia

Reno was previously twinned with these cities:

- Whanganui, New Zealand – ended in 2009 after years of inactivity.

== See also ==
- USS Reno (CL-96)

== Bibliography ==
- Benson, Heather Lené. "In Place/Out of Place: Punjabi-Sikhs in Reno, Nevada" (PhD dissertation, University of Nevada, Reno, 2022) online.
- DuVal, Gary (2002). The Nevada filmography: nearly 600 works made in the state, 1897 through 2000. McFarland. ISBN 978-0-7864-1271-6.
- Federal Writers' Project (1957), "Reno", Nevada: A Guide to the Silver State, American Guide Series, Portland, Or.: Binfords & Mort, hdl:2027/mdp.39015048749454 + Chronology
- Harpster, Jack. The Genesis of Reno: The History of the Riverside Hotel and the Virginia Street Bridge (University of Nevada Press, 2016).
- Moehring, Eugene P. Reno, Las Vegas, and the Strip: A Tale of Three Cities (University of Nevada Press, 2014).
- Moreno, Richard. A short history of Reno (University of Nevada Press, 2015).
- Price, John A. (1972). "Reno, Nevada: The City as a Unit of Study". Urban Anthropology. 1 (1): 014–028. JSTOR 40552854.
- Ringhoff, Mary, and Edward Stoner. The river and the railroad: An archaeological history of Reno (University of Nevada Press, 2011).
