= Artown =

Artown is a culture festival, hosted in Reno, Nevada on a yearly basis which started in 1996. During the years it has hosted many famous artists like Mikhail Baryshnikov, Marcel Marceau and others.

== History ==
In 1996, a group of business and arts executives in the Reno, Nevada (United States) Arts and Culture Commission developed a plan to use the arts to improve the city's self-image and give locals a reason to visit downtown. The idea was to highlight the community's cultural depth, ignite civic pride, and channel the economic and cultural rebirth of the city. Later that year, over three weeks in July, the first Uptown Downtown Artown festival took place. More than 30,000 people attended.

In the years since, Artown has grown into what the National Endowment for the Arts calls one of the most comprehensive festivals in the country, with more than 100 organizations and businesses offering about 350 visual, performing, and humanities events in 100 locations citywide, during the entire month of July. Approximately 350,000 people experience the festival annually.

Artown has welcomed such artists as Mikhail Baryshnikov, Marcel Marceau, Jazz at Lincoln Center Orchestra with Wynton Marsalis, Project Bandaloop, the American Ballet Theatre and Harlem Gospel Choir. The festival events include Discover the Arts, a hands-on arts program drawing more than 3,400 children annually; Movies in the Park, an outdoor screening of films; Monday Night Family Series, featuring kid-friendly performances from marionettes to music; and, the World Music Series, bringing musical entertainment from around the globe including David Krakauer's Klezmer Madness, Mariachi Sol de Mexico and San Jose Taiko. Artown incorporates exhibits from area galleries including the Nevada Museum of Art and hosts events such as Artown After Dark.
