= List of awards and nominations received by Courtney Love =

Courtney Love awards and nominations
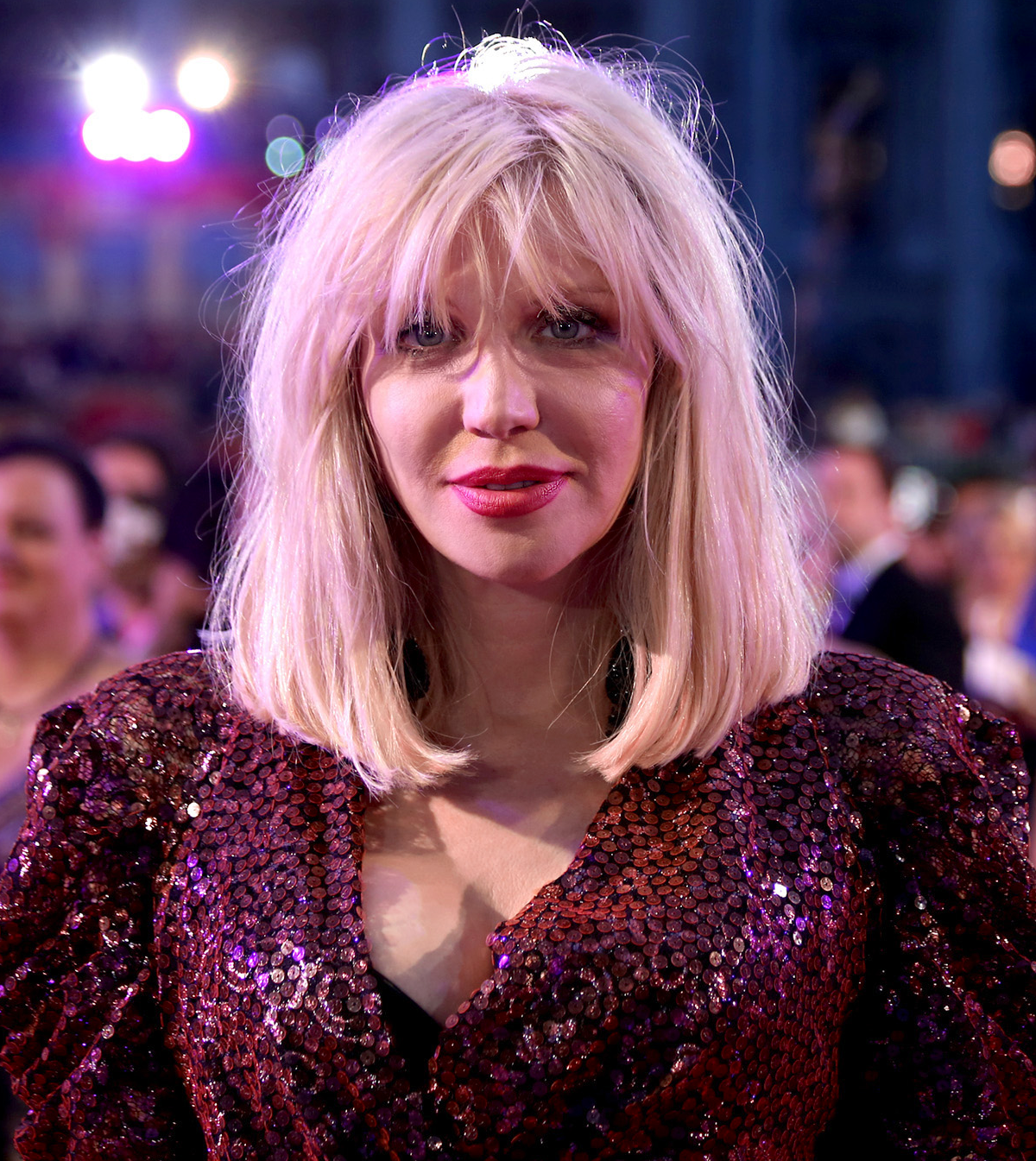
- Love at the 2014 Life Ball
Awards and nominations
Award	Wins	Nominations

Totals (Note: Certain award groups do not simply award one winner. They acknowledge several different recipients, have runners-up, and have third place. Since this is a specific recognition and is different from losing an award, runner-up mentions are considered wins in this award tally. For simplification and to avoid errors, each award in this list has been presumed to have had a prior nomination.)
- Wins: 7
- Nominations: 13

Courtney Love is an American singer, songwriter, musician, and actress, whose career began in 1989 when she established the alternative rock band Hole. She would transition into acting in the mid-1990s, appearing in a lead role as Althea Leasure in The People vs. Larry Flynt (1996), which earned her numerous critical accolades, including a Golden Globe Award nomination for Best Actress. She was also named best actress by various critics associations. In 2000, Love won the Best Actress award at Outfest for her performance in Julie Johnson. In addition to her film recognition, Love has been nominated (with Hole) for multiple Grammy Awards for their third studio album, Celebrity Skin (1998).

== Film ==
=== Golden Globe Awards ===
The Golden Globe Award is an accolade bestowed by the 93 members of the Hollywood Foreign Press Association (HFPA) recognizing excellence in film and television, both domestic and foreign.

Year	Nominated work	Category	Result	Ref.
1996	The People vs. Larry Flynt	Best Actress – Motion Picture Drama	Nominated	

=== MTV Movie Awards ===
The MTV Movie Awards is an annual award show presented by MTV to honor outstanding achievements in films. Founded in 1992, the winners of the awards are decided online by the audience.

Year	Nominated work	Category	Result	Ref.
1996	The People vs. Larry Flynt	Best Breakthrough Performance	Nominated	

=== Satellite Awards ===
The Satellite Awards are a set of annual awards given by the International Press Academy.

Year	Nominated work	Category	Result	Ref.
1996	The People vs. Larry Flynt	Best Supporting Actress – Motion Picture	Won	

=== Critics associations ===
Year	Nominated work	Association	Category	Result	Ref.
1996	The People vs. Larry Flynt	Boston Society of Film Critics	Best Supporting Actress	Won	
1996	The People vs. Larry Flynt	Broadcast Film Critics Association	Best Supporting Actress	Nominated	
1996	The People vs. Larry Flynt	Chicago Film Critics Association	Most Promising Actress	Won	
1996	The People vs. Larry Flynt	Chicago Film Critics Association	Best Actress	Nominated	
1996	The People vs. Larry Flynt	Florida Film Critics Circle	Best Supporting Actress	Won	
1996	The People vs. Larry Flynt	Los Angeles Film Critics Association	Best Supporting Actress	2nd place	
1996	The People vs. Larry Flynt	New York Film Critics Circle	Best Supporting Actress	Won	

== Music ==
=== Grammy Awards ===
Year	Nominated work	Category	Result	Notes	Ref.
1998	Celebrity Skin	Best Rock Album	Nominated	(with Hole)	
1998	"Celebrity Skin"	Best Rock Song	Nominated	(with Hole)	
1998	"Celebrity Skin"	Best Rock Vocal Performance by a Duo or Group	Nominated	(with Hole)	
1999	"Malibu"	Best Rock Vocal Performance by a Duo or Group	Nominated	(with Hole)	

=== MTV Video Music Awards ===
Year	Nominated work	Category	Result	Ref.
1995	"Doll Parts"	Best Alternative Video	Nominated	
1999	"Malibu"	Best Cinematography	Nominated	

=== NME Awards ===
Year	Nominated work	Category	Result	Ref.
2020	—N/a	Icon Award	Won	
