= Celebrity Skin =

Studio album by Hole
- Released: September 8, 1998
- Recorded: April 1997 – February 1998
- Studios: Conway Recording (Los Angeles); Record Plant West (Los Angeles); Quad (New York City); Olympic (London)
- Genres: Alternative rock; power pop; post-grunge; pop rock
- Length: 50:23
- Label: DGC
- Producer: Michael Beinhorn

Hole chronology
My Body, the Hand Grenade (1997)	Celebrity Skin (1998)	Nobody's Daughter (2010)

Singles from Celebrity Skin
- 1. "Celebrity Skin" Released: August 31, 1998; 2. "Malibu" Released: December 29, 1998; 3. "Awful" Released: April 27, 1999

Celebrity Skin is the third studio album by American alternative rock band Hole, released on September 8, 1998, in the United States on DGC Records and internationally on Geffen Records. It was the last album released by the band before their dissolution in 2002. Hole intended for the record to diverge significantly from their previous noise and grunge-influenced sound as featured on Pretty on the Inside (1991) and Live Through This (1994). The band hired producer Michael Beinhorn to record Celebrity Skin over a nine-month period that included sessions in Los Angeles, New York City, and London. It was the band's only studio release to feature bassist Melissa Auf der Maur. Drummer Patty Schemel played on the demos for the album but was replaced by session drummer Deen Castronovo at the suggestion of Beinhorn. This issue created a rift between Schemel and the band, resulting in her being kicked out of the band, dropped from the tour, and parting ways with the group, though she was still credited.

The band sought to use Los Angeles and the state of California as a unifying theme and began writing what they conceived as a "California album" in 1997. Unlike Hole's previous releases, the final songs on Celebrity Skin featured instrumental contributions from several musicians outside the band, primarily Billy Corgan, who co-wrote the musical arrangements on five songs. Auf der Maur's former bandmate Jordon Zadorozny, as well as Go-Go's guitarist Charlotte Caffey, also contributed to the composition of one track. Frontwoman Courtney Love, who wrote all of the lyrics, named the album and its title track after a poem she had written that was influenced by T. S. Eliot's "The Waste Land". Motifs of water and drowning are also prominent throughout the album.

Celebrity Skin is Hole's most commercially successful album. It peaked at number nine on the US Billboard 200, number four on the Australian Albums Chart, and number 11 on the UK Albums Chart. To date, it has sold over 1.4 million copies in the United States alone, has been certified as double-platinum in Australia by the Australian Recording Industry Association (ARIA), and platinum in Canada by Music Canada (MC) and the United States by Recording Industry Association of America (RIAA). It garnered Hole a number-one hit single on the Modern Rock Tracks chart with the title track, "Celebrity Skin". Critical reaction to the album was very positive and it was listed on a number of publications' year-end lists in 1998, including those by Time and The Village Voice. The album was named the 265th greatest album of all time by a 2013 poll by NME magazine and was featured in the book 1001 Albums You Must Hear Before You Die.

== Production and composition ==
=== Recording history ===
In September 1995, Hole completed the final leg of their year-long tour in promotion for their second studio album, Live Through This (1994). During the hiatus that followed, the members of Hole began working on individual projects. Frontwoman Courtney Love was cast as Althea Flynt in The People vs. Larry Flynt (1996) alongside Woody Harrelson, lead guitarist Eric Erlandson collaborated with Rodney Bingenheimer and Thurston Moore on the short-lived project Rodney & the Tube Tops from 1996 to 1997, bassist Melissa Auf der Maur provided backing on Ric Ocasek's album Troublizing (1997), and drummer Patty Schemel played with the Lemonheads on the tribute album Schoolhouse Rock! Rocks (1996).

After Love completed her obligations promoting The People vs. Larry Flynt, the band reunited to write new material for their next album, titled Celebrity Skin. According to Love, the embryonic versions of the songs "weren't very good" and "not written well". However, the songs developed following the band's relocation to several parts of the United States, including Nashville, Memphis, and New Orleans. During their time in New Orleans, the band recorded a number of demos, including an early version of "Awful" (1999) and songs which later developed into "Dying" and "Hit So Hard". During these writing and recording attempts, Love had grown frustrated as she felt the songs were not coalescing into a unifying whole. Erlandson later said he felt that "everything was falling apart... Making that record was insane. There were obstacles at each step of the way." Because of this perceived lack of direction, Love decided to use California as a theme to build the songs around: "Let's tie this together with a concept, even if it's fake," she recalled, "for directional purposes." Specifically, Love sought to interpret California as "a metaphor for the American dream".

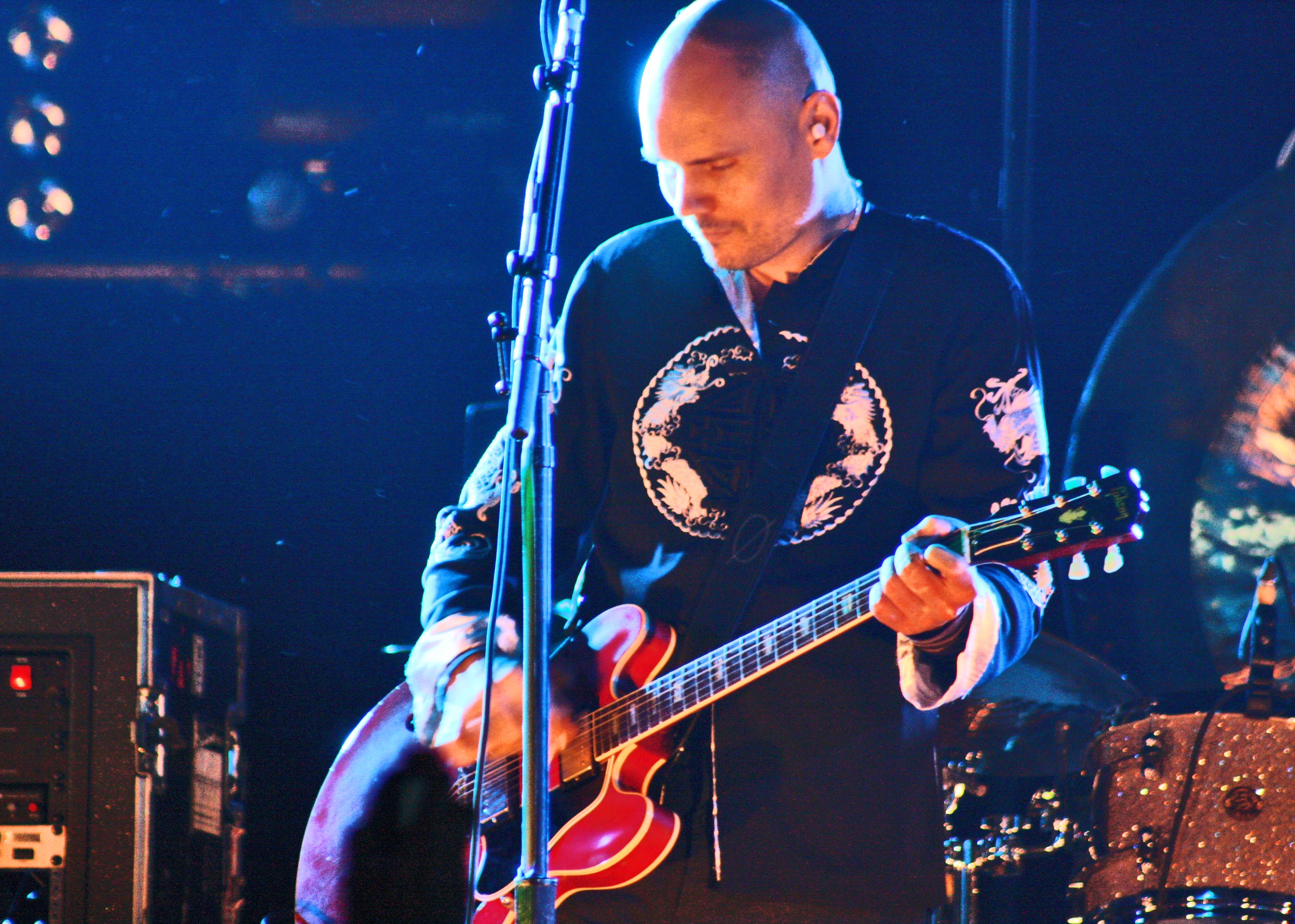
Billy Corgan, Love's friend and former boyfriend, helped write five songs on the record

The band entered Conway Recording Studios in Los Angeles in April 1997 to begin the recording sessions of the album. The original plan was to have Billy Corgan as executive producer, who was a second choice after Brian Eno, however, Corgan did not initially participate in, or contribute to the recording process. Michael Beinhorn was hired as head of production instead. Recording sessions for the album were spread out over the course of eight to nine months in various locations. The majority of the album was recorded at Conway Recording Studios, however, additional recording was done at Record Plant West in Los Angeles and Olympic Studios in London, United Kingdom. The final recording sessions were completed at Quad Studios in early 1998. These sessions were also video-taped by a friend of the band, as noted in an October 1998 article in Spin magazine. Auf der Maur characterized the sessions as being based around Love's busy schedule at the time: "It was her Hollywood phase", during which she would "chain-smoke Marlboro lights", "go to the beach at 7AM with a personal trainer and auditioning. She'd just done [The People vs.] Larry Flynt."

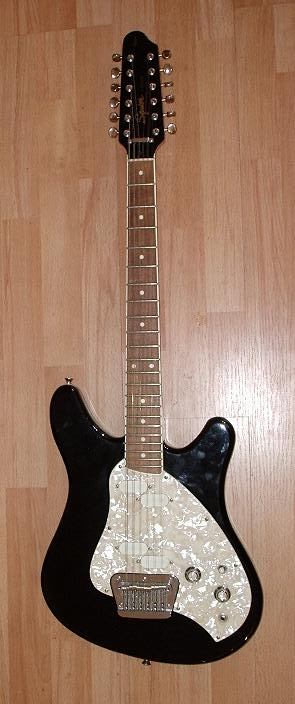
Love played a custom Fender Vista Venus on the album

According to Love, her vision for the album was to "deconstruct the California Sound" in the L.A. tradition of bands like The Doors, The Beach Boys and The Byrds, but she was struggling with the composition of the record and felt like she was "in a rut". After sending early recordings of the songs to Corgan, he decided to join the band in the studio for a total of twelve days in an attempt to help Love with her songcraft. Love compared Corgan's presence in the studio to "a math teacher who wouldn't give you the answers but was making you solve the problems yourself", and stated that he had her study key changes as well as melodies and phrasing from songs by Frank Sinatra and The Beatles:

What [Billy's] great at for me— what he did for me has nothing to do with Eric and Melissa. It has to do with me. I was in a rut; I could not even get out of bed. I didn't want to make this record; I didn't want to do anything. I was dull, my blade was not sharp, and he's probably one of the only people on the planet that can challenge me. My craft was at this place and Eric and Melissa and Patty couldn't help me; they all have brilliance and craft, but because I'm in a band within a family context with them, they weren't outsiders enough to really just help me.

Of the album's twelve tracks, Corgan shares instrumental songwriting credits on five. In addition to Corgan, Auf der Maur's former Tinker bandmate, Jordon Zadorozny, and Go-Go's guitarist and songwriter Charlotte Caffey helped co-compose the track "Reasons to Be Beautiful".

A wide variety of guitars, effect pedals and equipment were used during the recording of Celebrity Skin. Love used Fender tube amplifiers, Matchless amps, Ampeg amps and a Randall Commander that belonged to Love's late husband Kurt Cobain. Love's primary guitars during the sessions were her custom Fender Vista Venus and a Chet Atkins Gretsch. Erlandson's guitar set-up was much more complex, using numerous guitars through different effects in a set-up he arranged with Beinhorn. He used three of his Veleno guitars that were also used to record Live Through This, a 1968 Fender Telecaster and "numerous other guitars". Each signal from each guitar was split to two separate channels. One channel included a Tech 21 SansAmp, a collection of vintage analog synthesizers, including a Serge modular system, an ARP 2600 and a Moog modular system with a Bode frequency shifter. The other side included a Watkins Dominator, which "provided tons of low end", and generators that were later used during the production process. Recording was officially completed in London in late February 1998.

==== Drum tracks ====
Despite receiving credit on the album, Patty Schemel only recorded drum tracks for its demos, and was replaced by session drummer Deen Castronovo during the final recording sessions; thus, her drumming does not appear on the finished tracks. According to Schemel, Beinhorn was actively "psyching her out" in the studio when she began recording. According to sound technician Chris Whitemeyer, Beinhorn would request endless takes of Schemel's drumming, only to then lower the volume in his booth to inaudible levels, sit back, and read a newspaper. Whitemeyer also stated that Schemel was forced to drum in the studio eight hours a day for over two weeks, and that Beinhorn "wanted Patty to give up". Schemel later likened the recording sessions to "athletic training". After Schemel completed over two weeks of recording, Beinhorn brought Love into the studio and had her listen to recorded loops of Schemel's "weakest playing", and then suggested Castronovo as an alternative. Beinhorn also claimed to Love that Schemel would get "red-light fever" in the studio, implying that she was incapable of remembering the correct parts to play during recording. Whitemeyer claimed that Castronovo had been asked by Beinhorn to play on the record before Love or any of the other band members heard Schemel's drum tracks, and that Beinhorn "had it all planned out" early on.

Beinhorn's pressure, coupled with a feeling that Love wasn't supporting her, resulted in Schemel leaving the studio, requesting a settlement, and breaking ties with the band. Several months later, Schemel showed up to join the band for promotional photoshoots as per her original contract with the label, but refused to tour with the band to support the record. In 2002, Love admitted in an interview with Carrie Fisher that despite Beinhorn's meddling, it had ultimately been her decision to have Schemel replaced on the album:

Patty, who's been my drummer for years and years and years, she had like a two-year living-in-a-tent crack existence [in] downtown [Los Angeles]. I did this very "classic rock" horrible thing where I let the producer tell me that she sucked, let him play me a tape—this is so, like, out of the rock bad cliché book—let him play me a tape of her sounding the worst, that he had basically cobbled together. He'd kept a guy on retainer the whole time [...] I ruined her life for two years because I kicked her out of the band for the duration of the record.

=== Music and arrangements ===
Celebrity Skin marked a major shift in Hole's musical style, emphasizing a more mainstream alternative rock sound. Jael Goldfine of Paper magazine notes that the album "defined the post-grunge power pop sound of the '90s." Rolling Stone's James Hunter observed that the album features shifts in guitar sounds that alternate from "silveriness to something rougher in a heartbeat," adding that it is teeming with "minimalist explosion, idiomatic flair and dead-on rhythms." The Independent later referred to the album as having ushered in a pop rock "era" for Hole.

In 2018, Melissa Auf der Maur reflected "That wasn't something I was striving for but it was something Courtney and the label were. At the time I was like, 'why are you making this so fancy?' but she had a whole vision for her art." Rebecca Nicholson of The Guardian observed a darker subtext to the album's glossy production, however, noting: "Celebrity Skin's aesthetic is caught up in that turmoil of competing identities, a push-pull of glossy glamour and its seedy underbelly. For all the slickness of Michael Beinhorn’s production and the big-budget videos that accompanied its singles, the songs remain raw and cynical, as wary and worn as they are defiant."

== Lyrics and themes ==
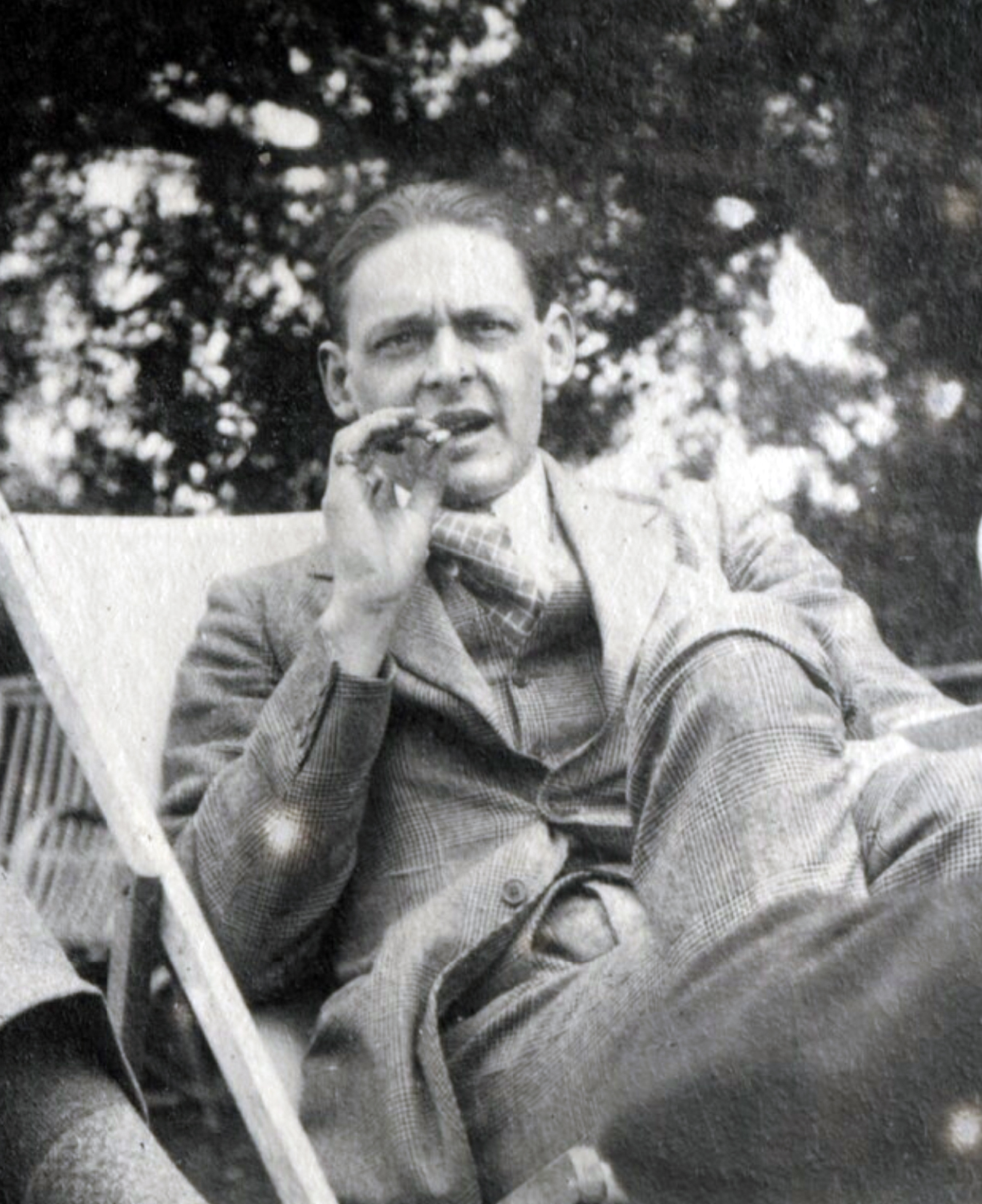
The works of T. S. Eliot influenced Love when writing the album's lyrics

While writing the lyrics for Celebrity Skin, Love aimed to "marry great hooks with a dense [lyrical] vision... I want to be as perverse as I'd like to be—while making you hum along with it." She cited an array of literary influences, including T. S. Eliot. Several songs on the album reference, and sometimes directly quote, multiple literary works: The album's title track directly quotes The House of Life by Dante Rossetti ("my name is might-have-been"), as well as William Shakespeare's The Merchant of Venice ("So glad I came here with your pound of flesh"). "Awful", the album's third single, references Neil Diamond's "Cherry, Cherry", as well as the American spiritual "Swing Low, Sweet Chariot".

Various lyrical references to Hollywood and California culture are present throughout the album. Whereas the band's debut, Pretty on the Inside, had dealt with the "repulsive aspects of L.A.—superficiality, sexism, violence, and drugs", Celebrity Skin examined the more opulent elements of Los Angeles—specifically from the perspective of Love, who at the time had risen as an A-list star— but "deconstructed the concept, picking off the healing scab of her public reinvention to rehash the wounds of her past". Commenting on the themes, James Hunter of Rolling Stone notes that the album is lyrically obsessed with "the promises and the agonies of Southern California. Sold-out sluts, fading actresses, deluded teenagers, “summer babes” and hunks—all this “beautiful garbage” crowds the roadside of the album." Gil Kaufman, writing about the album for MTV, noted that "Love's crash-and-burn lyrics are full of provocative, self-referential phrases that might harbor double or triple meanings."

Another prominent lyrical and aesthetic theme on the record is water and drowning, as noted by Erlandson in a 1998 interview on the album's composition and recording sessions. Erlandson cited the drowning death of Jeff Buckley, as well as the deaths of both Erlandson's and Auf der Maur's fathers of pulmonary edema and lung cancer, respectively. "Those were literal things," said Erlandson, "but drowning became a metaphor for this record and for all the people we had lost." Additional lyrical motifs include angels, stars, and heaven. Commenting on the recurring images throughout the album, Love said: "I'm a Cancer. I recycle."

On the album's title, Love divulged that she initially wanted to name it Holy War, as she felt it was "a mission statement. It's a statement of such pretense and import. It's incredibly ambitious." Erlandson alternately wanted to name the record Sugar Coma, which Love opposed, stating it was "pedestrian—it denotes the end of a cycle. Something deadly. If executives like it, you know it's bad." The final title, Celebrity Skin, was teased by Love during a 1995 interview with Jools Holland, in which she joked that she was considering naming their upcoming album Celebrity Skin because she had "touched a lot of it". She subsequently clarified that she had derived the name from a short-lived band in Los Angeles named Celebrity Skin, as well as a bootleg pornographic magazine featuring nude candid photos of celebrities.

== Release ==
Celebrity Skin was released internationally on September 8, 1998. It was the last album released by Hole before their dissolution in 2002, though frontwoman Courtney Love later revived the band with new members for the release of Nobody's Daughter in 2010.

=== Singles ===
Despite the extreme measures undertaken by Hole's label, DGC Records, to prevent the album from leaking (including an "iron clad" agreement that prohibited music journalists who received advance copies from allowing anyone else to hear or record the album), the first single from the album, "Celebrity Skin", was leaked three weeks before its intended release dates and played "nearly a dozen times" on New York radio station WXRK (92.3 FM) and their Los Angeles-based sister station, KROQ-FM (106.7 FM), on the weekend of July 31 to August 2, 1998. DGC spokesperson Jim Merlis denied that the leak originated from them and issued WXRK a cease and desist order on August 3, 1998. Nevertheless, San Francisco radio station Live 105 (105.3 FM) played the single again the following weekend.

The lead single, "Celebrity Skin", was officially released on September 8, 1998, the same day of the album release. It peaked at number 85 on the US Billboard Hot 100, and entered the top 20 of the United Kingdom, Scotland, and Iceland. It also topped the US Alternative Songs chart and the Canadian Rock/Alternative chart. The single was nominated for Best Rock Song and Best Rock Vocal Performance by a Duo or Group at the 1999 Grammy Awards. It was followed by "Malibu", released on December 29, 1998. The single peaked at number 81 on the US Billboard Hot 100, and entered the top 40 of Australia, New Zealand, and the United Kingdom.

"Malibu" was nominated for Best Cinematography at the 1999 MTV Video Music Awards and nominated for a Music Video Cinematography Achievement provided by the Music Video Production Association. The single also received a nomination for Best Rock Vocal Performance by a Duo or Group at the 2000 Grammy Awards. The third and final single, "Awful", was released on April 27, 1999. It peaked at number 13 on US Alternative Songs chart and entered the ARIA Top 100 Singles Chart and the UK Singles Chart.

=== Artwork ===
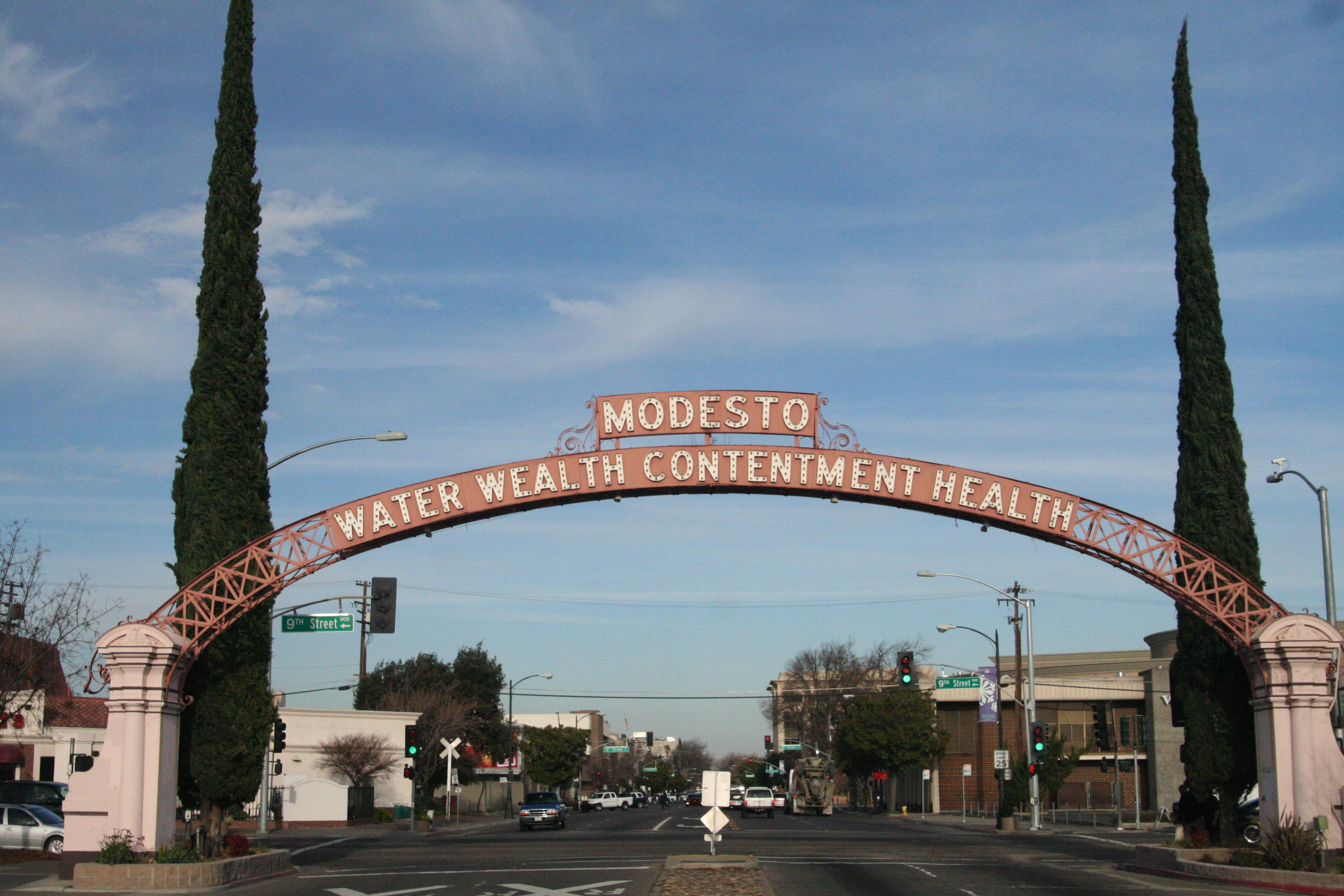
A photograph of the Modesto Arch appears in the album's liner notes, referencing the recurring themes of water and California

The front cover of the album features a black-and-white photograph of all four band members standing in front of a burning palm tree. The photograph was a Polaroid that had initially been intended as a test shot, but was ultimately chosen for the cover art. Joe-Mama Nitzberg, the album's art director, recalled that the palm tree and fire were in fact real, and that at one point during the shoot, a wind gust led the tree to topple over. Nitzberg stated that the unifying visual theme for the album's overall artwork and packaging was to highlight Los Angeles as an artificial "paradise."

The lyrical themes of water and drowning were carried over to the album's packaging, with the back cover displaying a cropped version of the painting Ophelia (1895) by Paul Steck. Photographs of the Modesto Arch (which reads "Water, Wealth, Contentment, Health") and the Los Angeles Department of Water and Power figure in the liner notes, keeping in theme with the album's preoccupation with California. The liner notes dedicate the album to "the stolen water of Los Angeles and to anyone who ever drowned", the former referring to the California water wars.

== Reception and legacy ==
Professional ratings
Review scores
Source	Rating
AllMusic	3.5/5 stars
The Austin Chronicle	3.5/5 stars
Entertainment Weekly	C+
The Guardian	3/5 stars
The Independent	4/5 stars
Los Angeles Times	4/4 stars
NME	8/10
Pitchfork	9.0/10
Rolling Stone	4/5 stars
Spin	9/10

Celebrity Skin received positive reviews from music critics. The Village Voice critic Robert Christgau said Love is "better punk than actress, better actress than popster" and listed the title track and "Awful" as the album's most notable songs. Robert Cherry of the Alternative Press described Celebrity Skin's sound as "meticulously orchestrated guitars, multilayered vocal harmonies, quantized drums and sheeny studio magic" and said the songs "hit nerve centers like a thousand AM classics". The Austin Chronicle's Marc Savlov referred to the album as "end of the summer crunch-pop from the most enigmatic woman around" but criticized Love's "painful, quasi-Freudian vein" and "Michael Beinhorn's slick, SoCal production". The Los Angeles Times reviewer Robert Hilburn called the album "one wild emotional ride" and "a far more complex work than the invigorating, mainstream coating would lead you to believe." Steve Sutherland of NME mentioned that "the first thing you think when Celebrity Skin smacks you in the nose is that you may never need to hear a rock 'n' roll record ever again," and compared the album's sound to Fleetwood Mac.

James Hunter from Rolling Stone described it as "sprung, flung and fun, high-impact, rock-fueled pop" and noted that "it teems with sonic knockouts that make you see all sorts of stars and is accessible, fiery and intimate – often at the same time," while Spin reviewer Joshua Clover referred to the album as "a record filled with quotation and reference, backtalk and revision" and said "there are too many great songs, and this is a magnificent pop record." A review published in Musician also praised the album, particularly Erlandson's guitar contributions, noting: "Erlandson's tireless, monomaniacal guitar wizardry gives Celebrity Skin its gorgeous textures and resonant power." Entertainment Weekly reviewer David Browne said "the music is sleeker and more taut than anything Hole have done". The Guardian's Caroline Sullivan awarded the album three out of five stars, writing that "Love and Hole have always been about feeling rather than technique... well, a bit of technique actually creeps in, too. Technique is the only word for whatever process made certain segments of Celebrity Skin sound so confident, so smooth."

Of retrospective assessments, AllMusic editor Stephen Thomas Erlewine wrote that the album was "a glaze of shiny guitars and hazy melodies, all intended to evoke the heyday of Californian pop in the late '70s," awarding the album three and a half stars out of five. In a piece celebrating the album's 20th anniversary, Stereogum critic Gabriela Claymore characterized it as a "polished, decadent rock [record] with something rotten at its core... Hole's most sonically accomplished album but it is not their best." Tom Edwards of Drowned in Sound was more critical in a retrospective review, referring to "Awful" as "gorgeous, pure blues" and "Hit So Hard" as "the best song about love since 'Retard Girl'," but concluding that "it's a weak record full of empty music either way" (in spite of giving the album an 8 out of 10).

=== Accolades ===
Several publications included Celebrity Skin in their year-end periodical lists, including Time, who listed the album at number nine on its Best of 1998 Music list, Spin, who listed the album at number 11 on its Top 20 Albums of the Year list, and The Village Voice, who listed the album at number 14 in the Pazz and Jop Critics' Poll. Los Angeles Times's Robert Hillburn ranked it number five on the list of Top 10 Albums of the Year. The 2013 NME's The 500 Greatest Albums of All Time ranked Celebrity Skin 265th on their list. It is also included in the book 1001 Albums You Must Hear Before You Die (2010). Celebrity Skin was nominated for Best Rock Album at the 1999 Grammy Awards.

== Commercial performance ==
Celebrity Skin was a commercial success, charting in various countries within a week of its release. In the United States, the album debuted at number nine on the Billboard 200 with sales of 86,000 copies in its first week. The album was certified gold by the Recording Industry Association of America (RIAA) on October 13, 1998, and later certified platinum on December 21 for shipments in excess of one million copies. As of April 2010, it had sold 1.4 million copies in the United States.

The album has also been certified Platinum by platinum by Music Canada (MC), peaking at number three with sales of over 100,000 copies, and two times Platinum by the Australian Recording Industry Association (ARIA), peaking at number four, with sales of over 140,000 copies. In the United Kingdom, it peaked at number 11, and was certified Gold by the British Phonographic Industry (BPI). It has since sold with 124,221 copies copies in the country. Additionally, the album peaked at number 15 on the Austrian Albums Chart; on Switzerland's Albums Chart at number six; on Sweden's Albums Chart at number 10; and on the New Zealand Music Chart at number 15, where it was also certified gold.

== Track listing ==
All lyrics written by Courtney Love. All tracks produced by Michael Beinhorn.

No.	Title	Music	Length
1.	"Celebrity Skin"	Love; Eric Erlandson; Billy Corgan	2:42
2.	"Awful"	Love; Erlandson; Melissa Auf der Maur; Patty Schemel	3:16
3.	"Hit So Hard"	Love; Corgan; Erlandson	4:00
4.	"Malibu"	Love; Erlandson; Corgan	3:50
5.	"Reasons to Be Beautiful"	Love; Erlandson; Auf der Maur; Jordon Zadorozny; Charlotte Caffey	5:19
6.	"Dying"	Erlandson; Corgan	3:44
7.	"Use Once & Destroy"	Love; Erlandson; Auf der Maur; Schemel	5:04
8.	"Northern Star"	Erlandson	4:58
9.	"Boys on the Radio"	Love; Erlandson; Auf der Maur	5:09
10.	"Heaven Tonight"	Erlandson	3:31
11.	"Playing Your Song"	Love; Erlandson; Auf der Maur	3:21
12.	"Petals"	Love; Erlandson; Corgan	5:29
Total length:			50:23

Japanese edition bonus track
No.	Title	Writer(s)	Length
13.	"Best Sunday Dress"	Love; Erlandson; Kat Bjelland	4:25
Total length:			54:48

== Personnel ==
Credits adapted from the liner notes of Celebrity Skin and Hit So Hard: A Memoir.

Hole

- Courtney Love – lead vocals, rhythm guitar
- Eric Erlandson – lead guitar
- Melissa Auf der Maur – bass, backing vocals
- Patty Schemel – drums (Note: While Schemel officially receives credit in the liner notes, her drumming does not appear on the album, as her drum tracks were replaced by Deen Castronovo's during the recording sessions.)

Guest musicians

- Deen Castronovo – drums (uncredited)
- Billy Corgan – bass (3, 12)
- Craig Armstrong – strings (6, 12)
- David Campbell – strings (8)

Production

- Michael Beinhorn – producer, programming
- Eric Erlandson – additional producer
- Paul Northfield – engineer (at Conway Recording Studios)
- Rob Eaton – engineer (at Quad Recording Studios)
- Joe Barresi – engineer (at Record Plant West)
- Frank Filipetti – engineer (at Olympic Studios)
- John Nelson – additional engineer (at Conway Recording Studios)
- Ben Holt – additional engineer
- Ann Mincieli – additional engineer
- Paul Walton – additional engineer

Technical

- Tom Lord-Alge – mixing (1, 2, 6, 7, 9, 11, 12)
- Chris Lord-Alge – mixing (4, 5, 8, 10)
- Jack Joseph Puig – mixing (3)
- Leo Ferrera – mixing assistant
- Femio Hernandez – mixing assistant
- Rob Hoffman – mixing assistant
- Mike Dy – mixing assistant
- Jim Champagne – mixing assistant
- Ted Jensen – mastering
- Paul DeCarli – programming
- Max Risenhower – programming
- Chris Vrenna – programming
- Nick Franglen – programming
- Chris Whitemyer – technician

Design

- Joe-Mama Nitzberg – art direction
- Janet Wolsborn – art direction
  - Front cover: Guzman (Constance Hansen & Russell Peacock)
  - Back cover: Ophelia Drowning by Paul Steck, 1895 (Giraudon/Art Resource, New York)
- Maggie Hallahan – photography
- Robert Dawson – photography
- Richard Prince – photography

== Charts ==
=== Weekly charts ===
Weekly chart performance for Celebrity Skin
Chart (1998)	Peak position
Australian Albums (ARIA)	4
Austrian Albums (Ö3 Austria)	15
Belgian Albums (Ultratop Flanders)	23
Belgian Albums (Ultratop Wallonia)	48
Canada Top Albums/CDs (RPM)	3
Dutch Albums (Album Top 100)	62
European Albums (Music & Media)	16
French Albums (SNEP)	24
German Albums (Offizielle Top 100)	21
Japanese Albums (Oricon)	23
New Zealand Albums (RMNZ)	15
Norwegian Albums (VG-lista)	14
Scottish Albums (Official Charts)	18
Swedish Albums (Sverigetopplistan)	10
Swiss Albums (Schweizer Hitparade)	26
UK Albums (Official Charts)	11
US Billboard 200	9

=== Year-end charts ===
1998 year-end chart performance for Celebrity Skin
Chart (1998)	Position
Australian Albums (ARIA)	83
Canada Top Albums/CDs (RPM)	90
US Billboard 200	152

1999 year-end chart performance for Celebrity Skin
Chart (1999)	Position
Australian Albums (ARIA)	45
US Billboard 200	129

== Certifications ==
Certifications for Celebrity Skin
Region	Certification	Certified units/sales
Australia (ARIA)	2× Platinum	140,000^{^}
Canada (Music Canada)	Platinum	100,000^{^}
New Zealand (RMNZ)	Gold	7,500^{^}
New Zealand (RMNZ) Sales + streams	Platinum	15,000^{‡}
United Kingdom (BPI)	Gold	100,000^{^}
United States (RIAA)	Platinum	1,000,000^{^}
^{^} Shipments figures based on certification alone.^{‡} Sales+streaming figures based on certification alone.
