= Celebrity Skin (song) =

1998 single by Hole

Single by Hole

from the album Celebrity Skin
- B-side: "Best Sunday Dress"; "Dying" (demo)
- Released: August 31, 1998
- Recorded: 1997
- Studio: Conway Recording, Record Plant West (Los Angeles)
- Genre: Alternative rock; power pop
- Length: 2:42
- Label: Geffen
- Songwriters: Courtney Love; Billy Corgan; Eric Erlandson
- Producer: Michael Beinhorn

Hole singles chronology
"Gold Dust Woman" (1996)	"Celebrity Skin" (1998)	"Malibu" (1998)

Music video
- "Celebrity Skin" on YouTube

"Celebrity Skin" is a song by American alternative rock band Hole, released on August 31, 1998, as the first single from their third studio album of the same name. It is their only single to peak at number one on the US Billboard Modern Rock Tracks chart. In October 2011, NME ranked it the 126th best track of the past 15 years.

== Composition ==
=== Music and arrangements ===
The song was written and recorded in 1997, after Hole's reported hiatus the previous year due to frontwoman Courtney Love's burgeoning film career. Love and Hole guitarist Eric Erlandson co-wrote the song with Smashing Pumpkins frontman Billy Corgan, whom Love later said provided the main guitar riff. MTV's Gil Kaufman saw the song as part of a revival of glam rock that took place in the 1990s. According to Kaufman, other examples of this revival included Spacehog's "In the Meantime" (1995), Marilyn Manson's "I Don't Like the Drugs (But the Drugs Like Me)" (1998), and Todd Haynes' Velvet Goldmine (1998), a film about a David Bowie-esque rock singer.

=== Lyrics ===
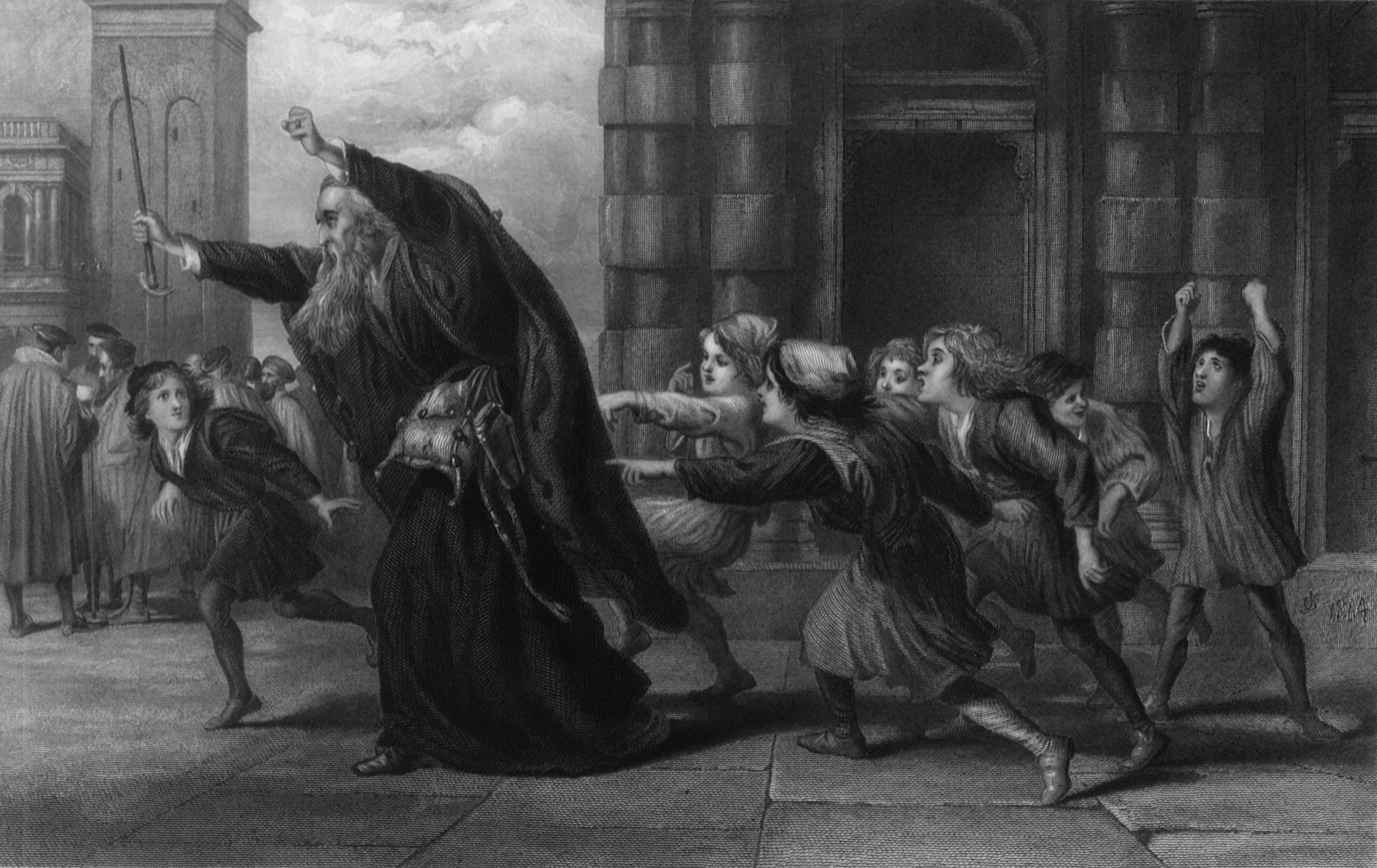
The lyric "I'm glad I came here with your pound of flesh" references William Shakespeare's The Merchant of Venice (depicted here by John Gilbert)

The lyrics, written by Love, contain several literary references; the line "Oh, look at my face / My name is might-have-been" is directly lifted from the opening verse of Dante Gabriel Rossetti's poem, "A Superscription," (and also quoted in Eugene O'Neill's Long Day's Journey into Night) while the phrase "pound of flesh" originates from William Shakespeare's The Merchant of Venice.

Commenting on the theme of celebrity, Love said: "Once you've stood onstage bleating your schoolgirl poetry, are you going to stay there, when you have the power and ability to give yourself a platform? I mean, here's the celebrity, and we all know it's stupid and ephemeral, but why not foster it? Why not feed it? Because all that it will do is give the thing that has substance – the art – more power." The song's title shares the name of an independent pornographic magazine of the same name showing celebrity nudity, as well as a short-lived punk rock group from Los Angeles that featured ex-Germs drummer Don Bolles.

Journalist Carrie Bell of Billboard noted in 1998 that the song dissects "the problem of maintaining an image and living in the public eye." Guitarist Eric Erlandson responded to this statement: "Courtney writes what she feels, and this is obviously one of her observations of Hollywood. We used this great hollow city as inspiration for the album."

== Release ==
"Celebrity Skin" was released as the debut single of its eponymous album, Celebrity Skin, on August 31, 1998, reaching the top 10 on the US Billboard Modern Rock Tracks chart. It spent a total of 26 weeks on the chart, peaking at number one on October 10, 1998.

=== Critical response and legacy ===
NME referred to the track's musical elements as featuring a "balls-in-the-air guitar riff the size of Australia, and a production sheen that was the sonic equivalent of looking directly at the sun." In 2011, the same publication ranked the song number 126 on a list of the "150 Best Tracks of the Last 15 Years." James Hunter of Rolling Stone wrote of the song: "Hole are immediately in your face with the cheese-metal riffs and cuddly dissolves," deeming it "a track full of cloudless energy that seems to explode the malaise that has surrounded Love." The song received two Grammy nominations for Best Rock Song, losing to "Uninvited" by Alanis Morissette and Best Rock Performance by a Duo or Group with Vocal, losing to "Pink" by Aerosmith.

== Music video ==
The music video for "Celebrity Skin" was directed by Nancy Bardawil. The video features the band performing the song on a stage, women wearing pink-purple ball gowns hanging from the ceiling and the women later lifting up their skirts as they amble around the stage. The video design bears resemblance to a key sequence in the Marilyn Monroe film Gentlemen Prefer Blondes (1953). As well as performance footage, there are also a number of close-ups of Courtney Love and Melissa Auf der Maur lying in coffins. Patty Schemel, although still a member of the band at the time of shooting, does not appear in the video. Schemel was replaced by a lookalike (Samantha Maloney using red hair to emulate Schemel) and only informed a music video was planned after it was shot. The video was shot in black and white and the footage was colorized by Cerulean Fx in post-production.

== Formats and track listings ==
All songs were written by Courtney Love, Eric Erlandson, and Billy Corgan except where noted.

UK CD single (GFSTD 22345)

1. "Celebrity Skin" – 2:47
2. "Best Sunday Dress" (Love, Erlandson, Kat Bjelland) – 4:26
3. "Dying" (original demo) – 3:08

UK 7-inch single (GFS 22345)

1. "Celebrity Skin" – 2:47
2. "Best Sunday Dress" (Love, Erlandson, Bjelland) – 4:26

US promotional CD (PRO-CD-1194)

1. "Celebrity Skin" – 2:47

EU limited edition CD (GED22368)

1. "Celebrity Skin" – 2:47
2. "Best Sunday Dress" (Love, Erlandson, Bjelland) – 4:26
3. "Dying" (original demo) – 3:08

Japanese CD single (MVCF-12012)

1. "Celebrity Skin" – 2:47
2. "Reasons To Be Beautiful" (Love, Erlandson, Melissa Auf der Maur, Charlotte Caffey, Jordon Zadorozny) – 5:19
3. "Dying" (original demo) – 3:44

== Credits and personnel ==
Hole

- Courtney Love – lead vocals, guitar
- Eric Erlandson – guitar
- Melissa Auf der Maur – bass, backing vocals

Guest musicians

- Deen Castronovo – drums, percussion (Note: Patty Schemel, though credited, did not provide the drum tracks on the recorded versions of the song; Schemel was replaced by session drummer Deen Castronovo.)

Production

- Michael Beinhorn – producer, programming
- Eric Erlandson – additional producer

== Charts ==
=== Weekly charts ===
Hole version

Chart (1998)	Peak position
Australia (ARIA)	24
Canada Rock/Alternative (RPM)	1
Europe (Eurochart Hot 100)	74
France (SNEP)	64
Iceland (Íslenski Listinn Topp 40)	11
Italy Airplay (Music & Media)	7
New Zealand (Recorded Music NZ)	33
Scottish Singles Sales (Official Charts)	19
Sweden (Sverigetopplistan)	43
UK Singles (Official Charts)	19
US Billboard Hot 100	85
US Alternative Airplay (Billboard)	1
US Mainstream Rock (Billboard)	4

Doja Cat version

Chart (2022)	Peak position
Ireland (IRMA)	91
New Zealand Hot Singles (RMNZ)	11
US Hot Rock & Alternative Songs (Billboard)	18

=== Year-end charts ===
Chart (1998)	Position
Canada Rock/Alternative (RPM)	19
US Mainstream Rock Tracks (Billboard)	46
US Modern Rock Tracks (Billboard)	29

Chart (1999)	Position
US Mainstream Rock Tracks (Billboard)	40
US Modern Rock Tracks (Billboard)	43

== Certifications ==
Region	Certification	Certified units/sales
United Kingdom (BPI)	Gold	400,000^{‡}
United States (RIAA)	Platinum	1,000,000^{‡}
^{‡} Sales+streaming figures based on certification alone.

== In popular culture ==
- The song was used in the film American Pie, but did not appear on the soundtrack, as well as being featured in the intro of the video game NHL Rock The Rink, as well as the video games Rock Band and Sing Star as a playable track and downloadable content.
- It also appeared in the 2011 family film Hop. In 2012, the song was performed by Heather Morris and Chord Overstreet in the Glee episode "Makeover".
- A line from the song inspired the alternative rock group Garbage to name their third album Beautiful Garbage.
- The song was used in the "lip sync for your life" segment on the third episode of the tenth season of RuPaul's Drag Race, where Love was a guest judge.
- In 2018, Love performed the song with Rockin'1000 in Florence being backed by 1500 musicians.
- The song plays during the end credits of the 2019 film Captain Marvel.
- An edited version of the song is also used in the trailer of the 2020 Netflix film Enola Holmes
- It also appeared in the fifth episode of The Flight Attendant.
- On February 11, 2022, rapper/singer Doja Cat released a cover of "Celebrity Skin" as a part of her Super Bowl LVI commercial for Taco Bell.
- The song was played in the first episode of the American superhero television series Gen V.

== See also ==
- Number one modern rock hits of 1998
- List of RPM Rock/Alternative number-one singles (Canada)
