= Awful (song) =

Single by Hole

from the album Celebrity Skin
- Released: 1999
- Genre: Alternative rock; power pop
- Length: 3:16
- Label: Geffen
- Songwriter: Hole
- Producer: Michael Beinhorn

Hole singles chronology
"Malibu" (1998)	"Awful" (1999)	"Be a Man" (2000)

Music video
- "Awful" on YouTube

"Awful" is a single by American alternative rock band Hole from the band's third studio album, Celebrity Skin. Released in April 1999 by Geffen Records as a CD single, the song's lyrics explore how the media and modern pop culture corrupt young girls and how they should rebel against this. The line "swing low, sweet cherry" in the song is an allusion to the African American spiritual hymn, "Swing Low, Sweet Chariot".

== Background and history ==
Described as "funny" but also "kind of sad" by the writer herself, vocalist and guitarist Courtney Love has proclaimed that this is one of the favorite songs she has written. Writing the lyrics offered her a backwards glimpse at the angry, determined youth she once was but with the sobering experience of her adult years. The words were written before the music and were initially more than two pages long. At the time, they included "we are always on the list, we have always wanted this, finally we're popular, finally we're pretty". Courtney condensed the tome into the finished format to give the song a more suitable length.

The opening riff, which carries throughout the song, and the rhythm were written by bassist Melissa Auf der Maur and drummer Patty Schemel, who were roommates at the time. Although credited for authorship, Schemel left during the recording sessions due to personal issues and does not drum on the track, something Love laments. While Love has revealed only that she wishes Schemel's great rhythm was still on the track, Hole guitarist Eric Erlandson implied that Celebrity Skin producer Michael Beinhorn drove Schemel to a nervous breakdown.

== Music video ==
The music video for "Awful" was directed by Jeff Richter and features clips from various live shows during the band's 1999 tours. Most of the footage is from the band's performance at the Royal Australian Showgrounds on January 23, 1999, for the Big Day Out festival and features the album version synced over the live performance. Other clips include the band's performance at Cow Palace in March 1999 during the Beautiful Monsters Tour and backstage footage shot by Melissa Auf der Maur.

== Formats and track listings ==
=== Single ===
UK CD single #1 INTDE-97098

1. "Awful" (Courtney Love, Eric Erlandson, Melissa Auf der Maur, Patty Schemel)
2. "Miss World" (live) (C. Love, E. Erlandson)
- This version also includes a CD-ROM enhanced version of the promotional video for "Celebrity Skin".

UK CD single #2 INTDE-97099

1. "Awful" (C. Love, E. Erlandson, M. Auf der Maur, P. Schemel)
2. "She Walks on Me" (live) (C. Love, E. Erlandson)
- This version also includes a CD-ROM enhanced version of the promotional video for "Malibu".

European CD single IND-97060

1. "Awful" (C. Love, E. Erlandson, M. Auf der Maur, P. Schemel)
2. "Violet" (live) (C. Love, E. Erlandson)

US promotional single

1. "Awful" (C. Love, E. Erlandson, M. Auf der Maur, P. Schemel)
2. "Violet" (live) (C. Love, E. Erlandson)
- The live tracks on all singles were recorded at Melbourne's Big Day Out festival on January 26, 1999.

=== EP ===
Australian Tour Souvenir EP INTDM-97058

1. "Awful" (C. Love, E. Erlandson, M. Auf der Maur, P. Schemel) – 3:29
2. "Pretty on the Inside" (live) (C. Love, E. Erlandson, Jill Emery, Caroline Rue) – 1:44
3. "Heaven Tonight" (live) (E. Erlandson, C. Love) – 3:58
4. "Northern Star" (live) (E. Erlandson, C. Love) – 5:52
5. "Awful" (live) (C. Love, E. Erlandson, M. Auf der Maur, P. Schemel) – 3:24
6. "Malibu" (Ted Ottaviano Club Mix) (C. Love, E. Erlandson, B. Corgan) – 7:32
- All live tracks recorded at Melbourne's Big Day Out festival on January 26, 1999.

Japanese EP MVCF-14001

1. "Awful" (C. Love, E. Erlandson, M. Auf der Maur, P. Schemel) – 3:29
2. "Pretty on the Inside" (live) (C. Love, E. Erlandson, Jill Emery, Caroline Rue) – 1:44
3. "Heaven Tonight" (live) (E. Erlandson, C. Love) – 3:58
4. "Northern Star" (live) (E. Erlandson, C. Love) – 5:52
5. "Awful" (live) (C. Love, E. Erlandson, M. Auf der Maur, P. Schemel) – 3:24
6. "Celebrity Skin" (live) (C. Love, E. Erlandson, B. Corgan) – 2:42
- All live tracks recorded at Melbourne's Big Day Out festival on January 26, 1999, except "Celebrity Skin", recorded at Sydney's Big Day Out festival on January 23, 1999.

== Charts ==
Chart performance for "Awful"
Chart (1999)	Peak position
Australia (ARIA)	44
UK Singles (OCC)	39
US Alternative Airplay (Billboard)	13
