= Bakersfield Sign =

Landmark in Bakersfield

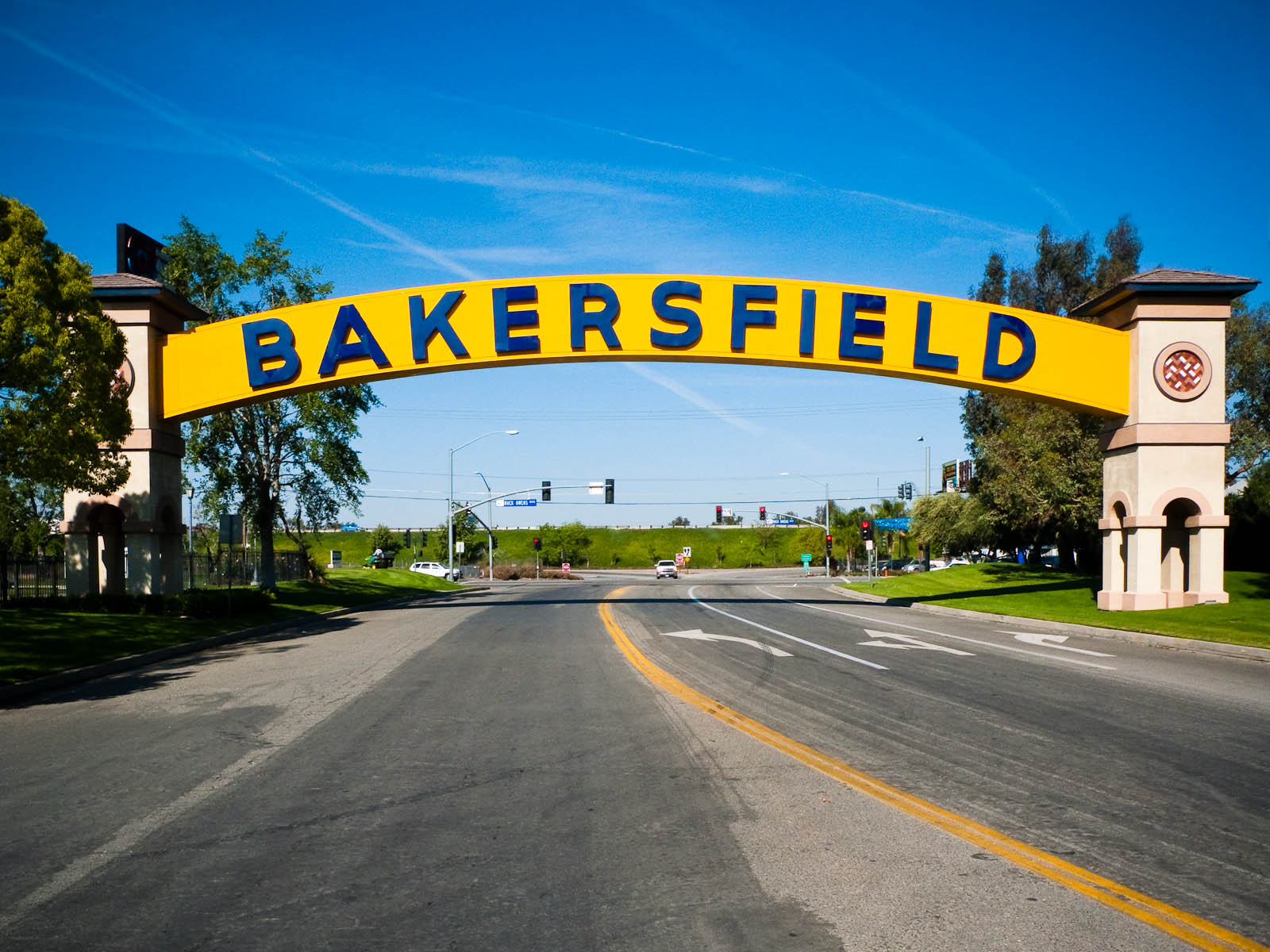
- The Bakersfield Sign, facing west on Sillect Avenue.
- Alternative names: Bakersfield Arch

General information
- Type: Sign
- Architectural style: Arch
- Location: Bakersfield, California
- Coordinates: 35.386°N 119.042°W
- Completed: 1949
- Renovated: 1999
- Owner: City of Bakersfield

Technical details
- Structural system: Steel support

The Bakersfield Sign (also known as the Bakersfield Neon Arch) is one of the most recognizable landmarks in Bakersfield, California. It is located over Sillect Avenue, where the street intersects with Buck Owens Boulevard, to the northwest of Downtown Bakersfield. The sign can be seen from State Route 99 (Golden State Freeway) and is just past the freeway off-ramp. It is also next to the Buck Owens Crystal Palace.

This sign is a yellow arch in which blue letters spell out the name of the city. It is supported by two towers, which were inspired by the Beale Memorial Clock Tower design. The sign is illuminated by indirect lighting. Typically, the letters are transparent and the lights, which are underneath the letters, shine through them. With indirect lighting, the letters are solid and the light, which is still underneath the letters, shines down onto the arch. The result is that the letters appear black on top of a lighted backdrop. The light used is green. It was built by California Neon Sign Company.

== History ==
Driving north under the Bakersfield Sign at its original location on Union Avenue (US Route 99), 1955.

The sign was originally constructed in 1949 and was over Union Avenue, just south of California Avenue. That road was a part of the Golden State Highway (US 99), which was the main connector between Northern and Southern California by the San Joaquin Valley. The Bakersfield Inn wanted to expand across the street. The sign was constructed as a footbridge to connect the two halves of the hotel.

The construction of the sign also served another purpose. Most of the Central Valley communities along US 99 had an arched sign spanning the highway to welcome drivers to the towns and cities that they were entering. The Bakersfield sign became the arched sign for the city.

By the late 1990s, the sign had fallen into a state of disrepair. The Bakersfield Inn had closed down and no one was maintaining the sign. The California Department of Transportation (Caltrans), fearing the sign could collapse onto the road, wanted to remove it. The original sign was demolished, and a new sign and towers were built by Sampson Steel (Duncan Sampson) in their steelyard, just north of the sign's new location; Rob Mann was Sampson Steel's project manager. Once the towers were built, the arched steel sign truss was carried down the street by crane in the early morning hours and stored on country singer Buck Owens' property to allow other trades access to perform their work.

The renovation took place in 1999 on the 50th anniversary of the sign's original construction. On the Fourth of July, the arched sign was erected next to the Buck Owens Crystal Palace in front of a large crowd. The project cost Owens more than $175,000, but most of the cost was donated by the various subcontractors and the general contractor. The old sign had fallen into such a state of disrepair that the only components that could be saved were the blue porcelain letters. By rebuilding the sign and using what original components could be salvaged, it was again visible to the important Golden State Highway route.

== In popular culture ==
The Bakersfield Sign has become a popular icon. It has been used in local TV and newspaper ads, company and government websites, and some book covers. Local artists also depict it in paintings and other art mediums.

Here are some of the most notable depictions:

- As part of a mural in the lobby of Reading Cinema, at Valley Plaza Mall.
- In the 2016 video game, American Truck Simulator.
- As part of the 2011 ECHL All-Star Game logo, which Bakersfield hosted. The design features a condor (which represents the Bakersfield Condors) grasping the Bakersfield Sign.
- On the 125th episode of The Fairly OddParents, some characters are taken to a cartoon recreation of the Bakersfield Sign through a black hole.

== See also ==
- Modesto Arch
- Reno Arch
