= Reno Arch =

Landmark arch in Reno, Nevada, United States

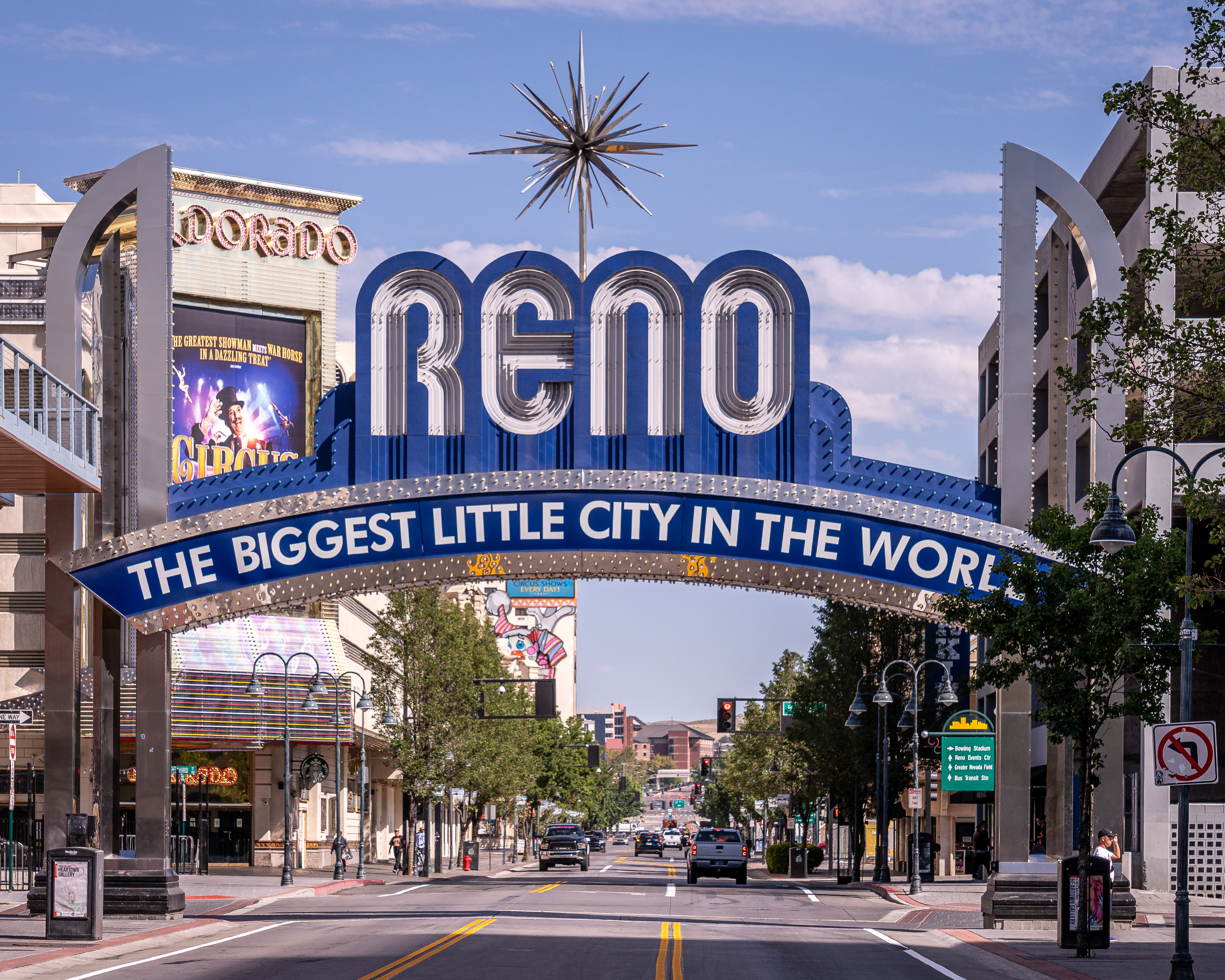
Daytime view of the current sign, after the 2018 color change

The Reno Arch is an iconic landmark in Reno, Nevada spanning Virginia Street at the intersection with Commercial Row. The current sign is the third version of the arch. It is owned and operated by the City of Reno. The original arch was built on October 23, 1926 to commemorate the completion of the Lincoln and Victory Highways. The current arch was installed on August 8, 1987, retrofitted with new lights on November 17, 2009 and had its design scheme revised to blue and silver on May 3, 2018. The arch is a prominent feature of downtown Reno and for most of its history has featured the city's motto, The Biggest Little City in the World.

== History ==
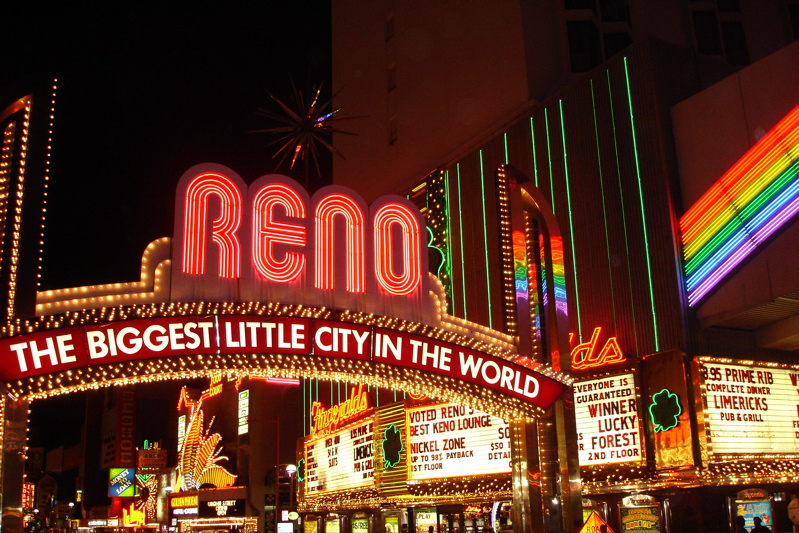
Reno Arch at night, prior to the 2018 color change

The first Arch was built on October 23, 1926 to promote the Nevada Transcontinental Highway Exposition that ran from July 25 to August 1, 1927, which celebrated the completion of the Lincoln and Victory Highways. Through Nevada, these routes were built along the corridors of modern U.S. Route 50 and Interstate 80, respectively. After the exposition, the city council decided to keep the arch as a permanent downtown gateway. The council announced a contest to find a slogan to replace the exposition lettering on the arch. G. A. Burns of Sacramento won $100 for his slogan, "Reno, The Biggest Little City in the World." The slogan first appeared on the arch on June 25, 1929, along with an illuminated torch on both sides of the city name. In 1934, some residents complained about the new slogan and it was replaced with a green neon "RENO"; however, after the ensuing backlash over its removal, the slogan returned with new lettering as well as the removal of the torches. After being replaced in 1963, the original arch was moved to Idlewild Park for a few years, until the street it crossed at the park was widened. The arch was in storage for some years, but in 1994, the sign was reassembled for use in the movie Cobb. Since 1995, the sign has been located on Lake Street, just south of the Truckee River at (39.525718°N 119.809785°W).

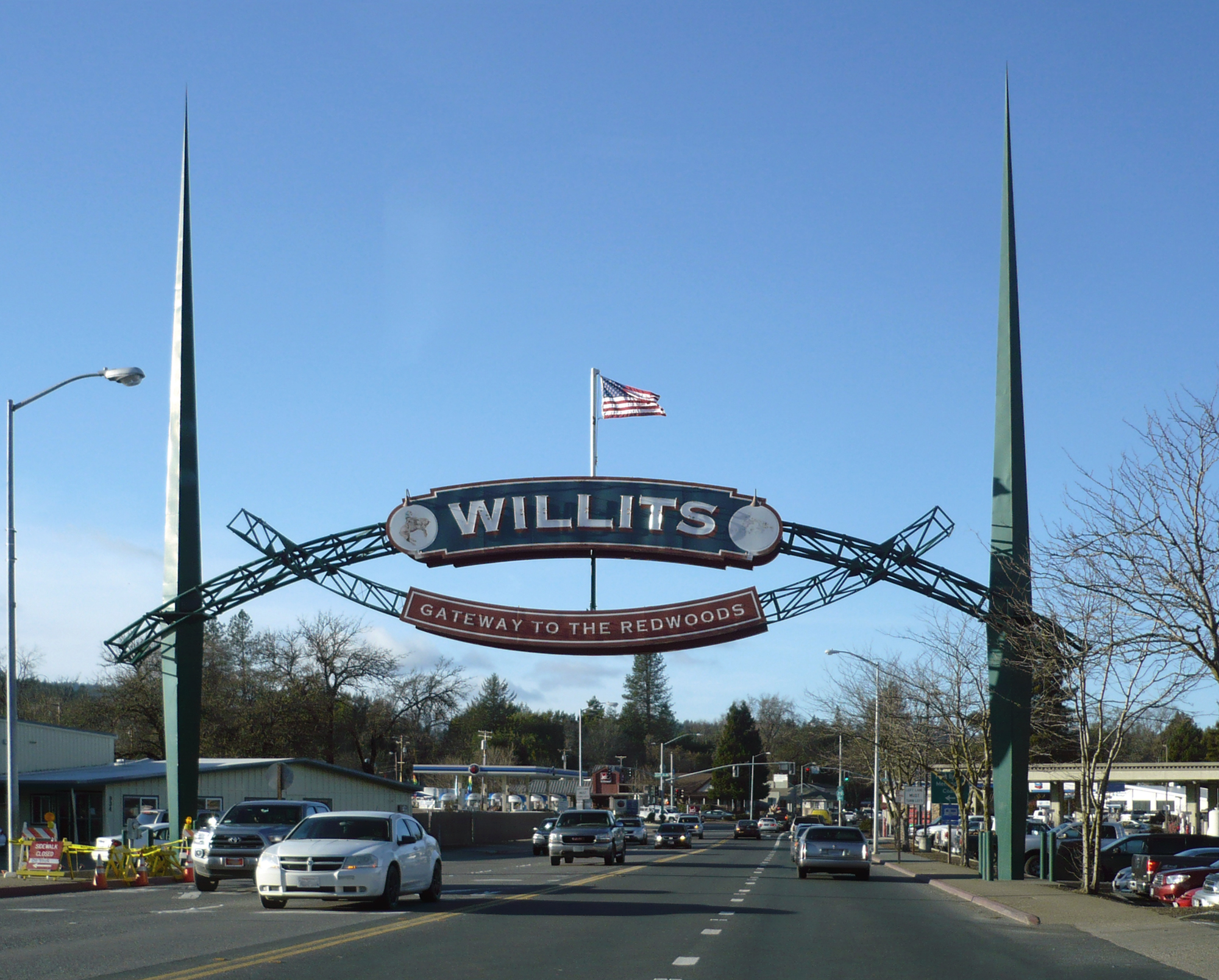
The Willits Arch

In 1963, the original steel arch was replaced by a larger arch with plastic panels, a rotating star and an attached inverted arch below the "RENO" lettering for the slogan "Biggest Little City in the World". After this arch was replaced, it was donated to the city of Willits, California. The city of Willits removed most of the plastic panels, replaced the star with the flag of the United States and the slogan with "Gateway to the Redwoods" and "Heart of Mendocino County". It now straddles Main Street, State Route 20, in downtown Willits.

The third and current version was installed by YESCO on August 8, 1987. On Tuesday, November 17, 2009, the City of Reno celebrated replacing the 2,076 incandescent 11-watt bulbs in the Reno Arch with 2.5 watt LED bulbs. The old incandescent bulbs were given away to spectators to commemorate the event.

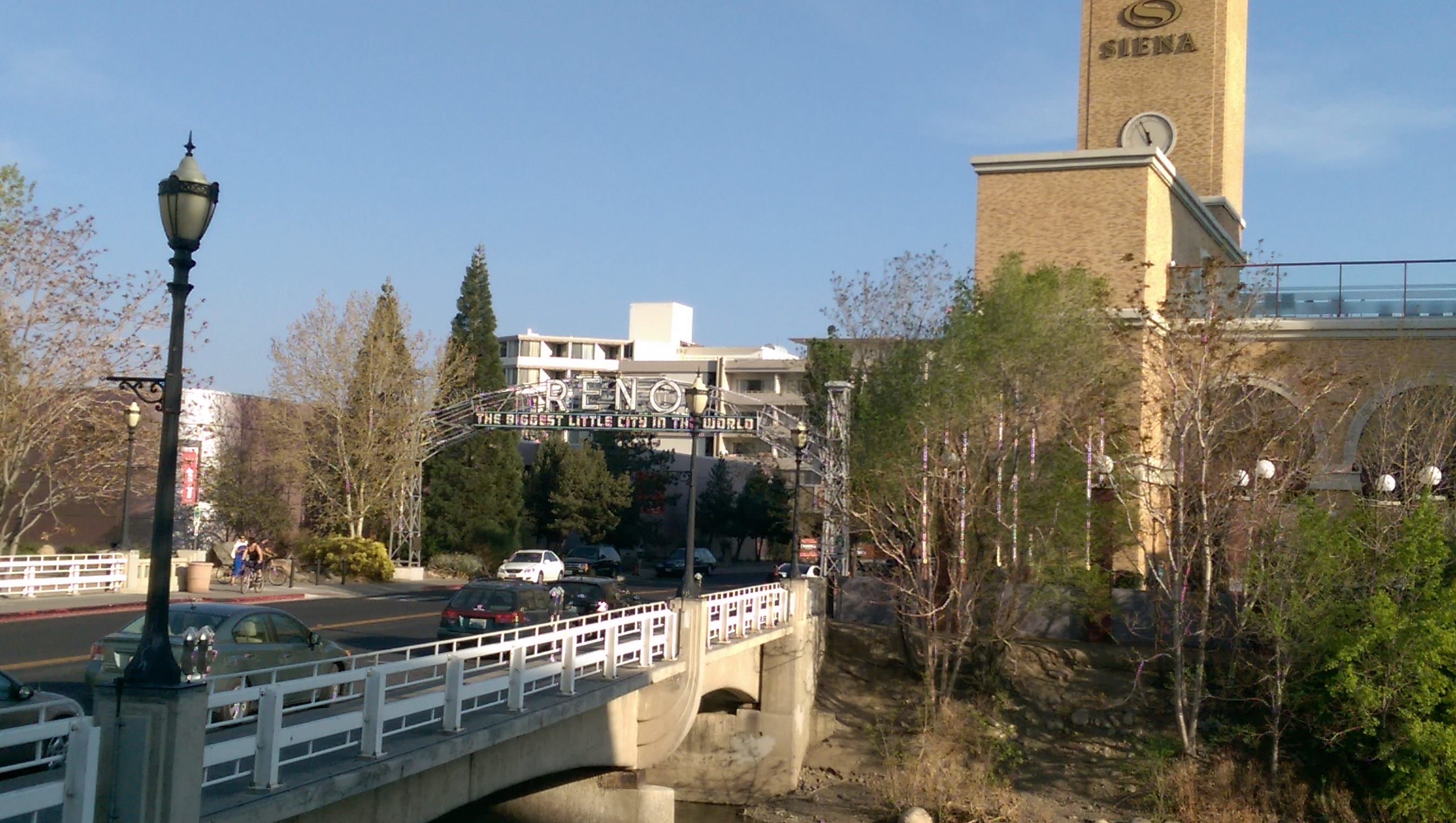
The original Reno Arch, relocated to Lake Street between the National Automobile Museum and Siena Reno

On December 13, 2017, the Reno City Council voted four-to-three to change the paint color on the sign to silver and blue with stainless brushed silver legs. Part of the rationale was for the change was that the gold legs on the sign were hard to maintain and easily damaged, and the colors would tie in to the University of Nevada, Reno. The update was expected to cost over $225,000 and was completed on May 3, 2018.

== Legacy ==
Movies set in Reno, such as Kingpin, Waking up in Reno, The Wizard and Sister Act feature the Reno arch prominently, as it is an icon for Reno newcomers. Many shows and activities, such as Hot August Nights, are held under the arch.

== See also ==
- Bakersfield Sign
- Modesto Arch
- Paifang
- Welcome to Fabulous Las Vegas sign
