= Squier Venus =

Signature series guitar

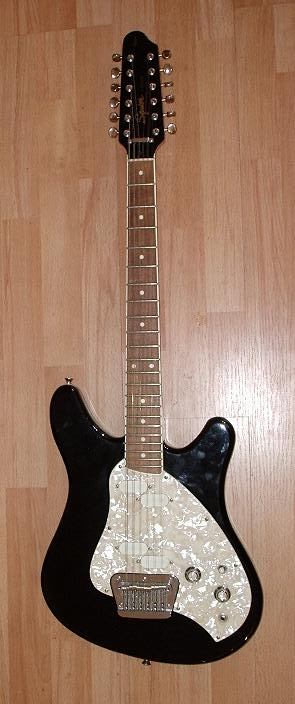
- Manufacturer: Squier
- Period: 1997–1998

Construction
- Body type: Solid
- Neck joint: Bolt-on

Woods
- Body: Basswood
- Neck: Maple, 25.5" scale
- Fretboard: Bound Rosewood, 22 frets

Hardware
- Pickup(s): HB pickup (bridge), single coil pickup w/staggered Alnico pole pieces (neck)

Colors available
- Black, Sea Foam Green, Sunburst.

The Squier Venus (commonly known as Fender Vista Venus) is a signature series guitar released in 1997 and co-designed by Courtney Love in conjunction with Fender's Squier brand, under the Vista series. At the time of its release, Love and Bonnie Raitt were the only two female musicians to have their own signature series of guitars.

Its shape was based on Mercury, Stratocaster and Rickenbacker solid-body guitars. It was released in two configurations, six or twelve string (the Venus XII). Colors available included black, sunburst and surf green. Surf green was named after paint code #57 (surf green) from Chevrolet c. 1957. Upon its original release, the Venus retailed for US$699.99 and the Venus XII for $999.99. It was discontinued at the end of 1998. Shirley Manson from Garbage played a custom pink Squier Venus live. Ryan Jarman from UK band The Cribs, a friend of Love's, used the surf green version of the guitar as his main instrument between 2011 and 2015.
