= Modesto Arch =

Centennial slogan arch

Coordinates: 37.63866°N 121.00032°W

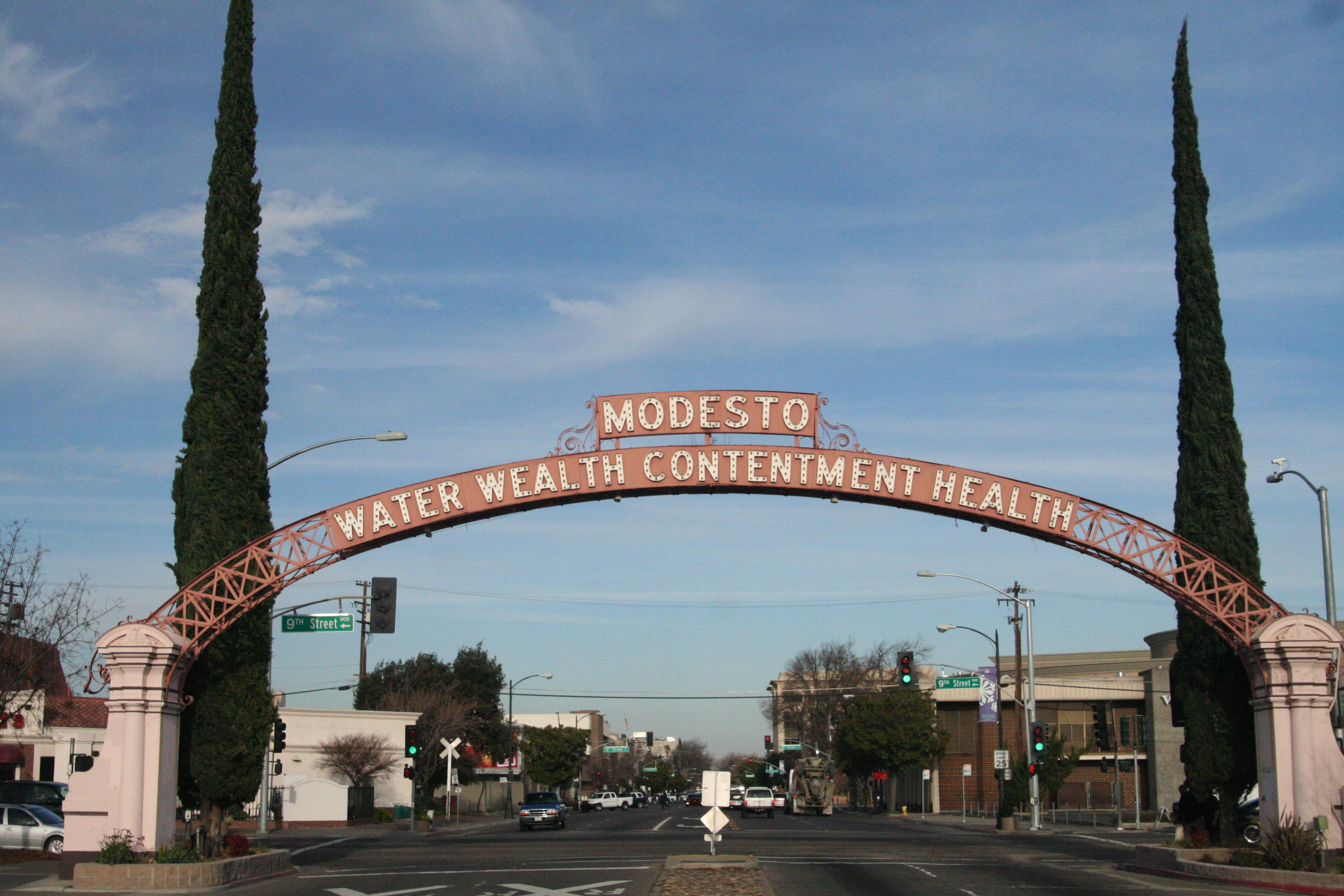
- The arch in 2010, before renovation.
- Interactive map of the Modesto Arch area

General information
- Year built: 1912
- Topped-out: 1912
- Completed: 1912
- Opened: 1912
- Inaugurated: 1912
- Renovated: 2012

The Modesto Arch is a centennial slogan arch, built in 1912, to welcome automobile drivers to Modesto, California where it currently stands at the intersection of 9th and I Streets. The arch bears the city's motto, "Water, Wealth, Contentment, Health", illuminated by 696 incandescent lightbulbs.

== History ==
The original first-place slogan was "Nobody's Got Modesto's Goat", which was later rejected, and the second-place slogan was used instead. The arch once bore two flagpoles on each of its columns until they were removed due to rot. Presently, two Mediterranean cypress trees stand behind the columns, which contribute to the illusion of the original flagpoles' height and location. In 1934, the arch was moved a little bit to the southwest to make way for the expansion of 9th Street.

In February 2012, a project was planned to restore the arch to its original appearance with the change of lightbulbs, repainting of the original color, patching minor cracks on the columns, and the replacement of the flagpoles. These plans have since taken place.

The arch is featured on the city flag of Modesto, adopted in 1988.

== In popular culture ==
- The arch is depicted in the video game American Truck Simulator.

== See also ==
- Bakersfield Sign
- Reno Arch
