= Malibu (Hole song) =

1998 single by Hole

Single by Hole

from the album Celebrity Skin
- B-side: "Drag"; "It's All Over Now, Baby Blue"
- Released: December 1998
- Length: 3:53
- Label: DGC
- Songwriters: Courtney Love; Eric Erlandson; Billy Corgan
- Producers: Michael Beinhorn; Eric Erlandson

Hole singles chronology
"Celebrity Skin" (1998)	"Malibu" (1998)	"Awful" (1999)

Alternative cover
- Alternative CD single cover art

Music video
- "Malibu" on YouTube

"Malibu" is a song by American alternative rock band Hole. It is the fourth track and second single from the band's third studio album, Celebrity Skin, and was released in December 1998, on DGC Records. The lyrics were written by vocalist and rhythm guitarist Courtney Love, with music written by Love, lead guitarist Eric Erlandson and Billy Corgan of the Smashing Pumpkins, who contributed to four other songs on Celebrity Skin.

The single was released on vinyl and compact disc in multiple countries, including the United States, United Kingdom, Australia, and Japan. The standard releases of the single feature "Drag" as well as a cover of Bob Dylan's "It's All Over Now, Baby Blue" as B-sides.

"Malibu" was one of Hole's most commercially and critically successful songs. (Note: Per the Billboard Modern Rock Tracks, "Malibu" peaked at number 3 in 1998; second to "Celebrity Skin", which peaked at number 1, "Malibu" was Hole's highest-charting singles.) The song peaked at number 3 on the US Modern Rock Tracks chart, and garnered a Grammy nomination in 1999.

== Composition ==
"Malibu" was written by frontwoman Courtney Love, lead guitarist Eric Erlandson, and Billy Corgan. The lyrics were written solely by Love, while the musical composition and arrangements are credited to Love, Erlandson, and Corgan. Love has stated that the song was actually written about her first boyfriend, Jeff Mann, whom she lived with in Malibu in the late mid-1980s. In 2018, Love revealed at a concert with Smashing Pumpkins that the song was initially written for Stevie Nicks.

== Release ==
"Malibu" was released as a single on CD, 7-inch vinyl, and other formats in the United States, the United Kingdom, and Australia. It was first released in the United States on compact disc on December 29, 1998, followed by a 7-inch vinyl release in the United States on May 25, 1999.

The single also includes "Drag", an outtake from Celebrity Skin which was replaced by "Malibu". The song was nominated for a Grammy Award in the Best Rock Performance by a Duo or Group with Vocal field, losing to "Put Your Lights On" by Santana. The single was certified Gold in Australia in 1999, with sales in excess of 40,000.

== Reception ==
Billboard gave the song a positive review, writing: "Detractors of Love and company may consider this the ultimate sellout, but programmers would do well to give this edgy but hooky track a listen. Love sounds downright dainty in comparison with past works—OK, well, tamer anyway—and is accompanied here by some great guitar hooks, swirling harmonies, and a sticky melody that could attract stations that like to maintain a tough exterior without sacrificing accessibility." The Atlantic said, "They shed the crusty vestments of grunge and go SoCal: Love still dominates, she's still at the center of the mix with her slouchy-snarly, melody-smearing, poetry-uttering, big-mouth, punk-rock voice, but the cleaned-up band now pumps along in a nice Fleetwood Mac groove. It works. It's a hit. And it's beautiful."

The song was ranked number 264 on "The 500 Greatest Songs Since You Were Born" list by Blender magazine in 2005. Blender also ranked it number 3 on their list of "The Greatest Songs About California".

== Music video ==
Directed by Paul Hunter, the music video for "Malibu" was shot in the eponymous city on a beach. The video features burning palm trees and the band performing the song. Eric Erlandson is also seen waxing a surfboard, and Melissa Auf der Maur lies on a rock over the ocean. The video also alludes to Baywatch at its conclusion, featuring a mass of lifeguards holding plastic dolls on the beach while Courtney Love walks into the ocean.

Samantha Maloney, who replaced drummer Patty Schemel, appears in the video.

== Formats and track listings ==
All songs written by Courtney Love, Eric Erlandson, and Billy Corgan except where noted.

US 7-inch single

1. "Malibu" – 3:53
2. "Celebrity Skin" – 2:43

UK 7-inch single

1. "Malibu" – 3:53
2. "Drag" (Love, Erlandson, Melissa Auf der Maur, Jordon Zadorozny) – 4:52

UK CD single (Note: The track listing for the United Kingdom CD single (GFSTD 22369) is identical to the Japanese release.)

1. "Malibu" – 3:53
2. "It's All Over Now, Baby Blue" (Bob Dylan) – 3:18

UK maxi-CD single (Note: Both live tracks recorded at Later... with Jools Holland at BBC Television Centre in London, United Kingdom on October 20, 1998.)

1. "Malibu" – 3:53
2. "Celebrity Skin" (live) – 2:58
3. "Reasons to Be Beautiful" (live) (Love, Erlandson, Auf der Maur, Zadorozny, Charlotte Caffey) – 5:25

Australian CD single

1. "Malibu" – 3:53
2. "Drag" (Love, Erlandson, Auf der Maur, Zadorozny) – 4:52
3. "It's All Over Now, Baby Blue" (Dylan) – 3:18
4. "Celebrity Skin" (video) – 2:43
5. "Malibu" (video) – 3:53

== Personnel ==
Personnel are adapted from Celebrity Skin's liner notes except where noted.

Hole

- Courtney Love – lead vocals, guitar
- Eric Erlandson – guitar
- Melissa Auf der Maur – bass, backing vocals

Guest musicians

- Deen Castronovo – drums (Note: Deen Castronovo is uncredited on both the single and album.)

Production

- Michael Beinhorn – producer, programming
- Eric Erlandson – additional producer
- Paul Northfield – engineer
- Chris Lord-Alge – mixing

== Charts ==
=== Weekly charts ===
Chart (1998–1999)	Peak position
Australia (ARIA)	11
Canada Rock/Alternative (RPM)	16
Canada Top Singles (RPM)	46
Europe (Eurochart Hot 100)	81
Iceland (Íslenski Listinn Topp 40)	13
New Zealand (Recorded Music NZ)	38
Quebec (ADISQ)	32
Scottish Singles Sales (Official Charts)	25
UK Singles (Official Charts)	22
US Billboard Hot 100	81
US Adult Pop Airplay (Billboard)	37
US Alternative Airplay (Billboard)	3
US Mainstream Rock (Billboard)	15

=== Year-end charts ===
Chart (1999)	Position
US Mainstream Rock Tracks (Billboard)	94
US Modern Rock Tracks (Billboard)	19

== Release history ==
Region	Date	Formats(s)	Label(s)	Ref(s).
United States	January 12, 1999	Contemporary hit radio	DGC; Geffen	
