= Paul Steck =

French painter (1866–1924)

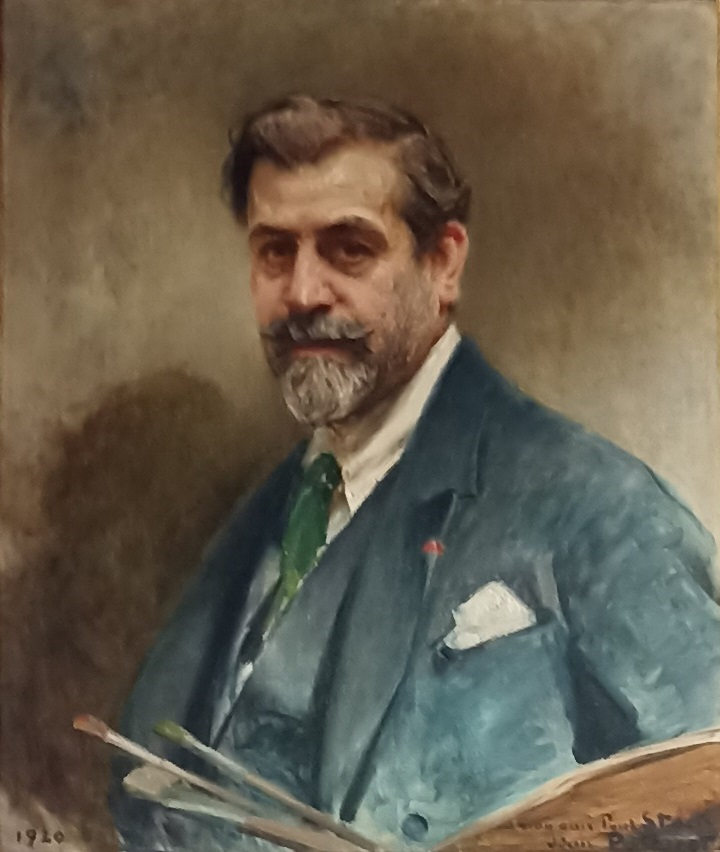
Portrait ,1920

Paul Steck (born Paul Albert Dugas; 27 May 1866 – 8 July 1924) was a French painter of landscapes, historical scenes, and several portraits from life.

== Biography ==
Paul Steck was born in Troyes, France. He began his career studying under Jean-Léon Gérôme. In 1896 he was made a member of the Société des Artistes Français. In 1896, he exhibited works in the fifth Salon de la Rose + Croix. In 1900, he won a bronze medal at the Exposition Universelle. In 1911, he was appointed deputy director of the École nationale supérieure des arts décoratifs in Paris.

Museums in Dieppe, Montauban, and Rouen display his work. He died in Paris.

== Selected works ==
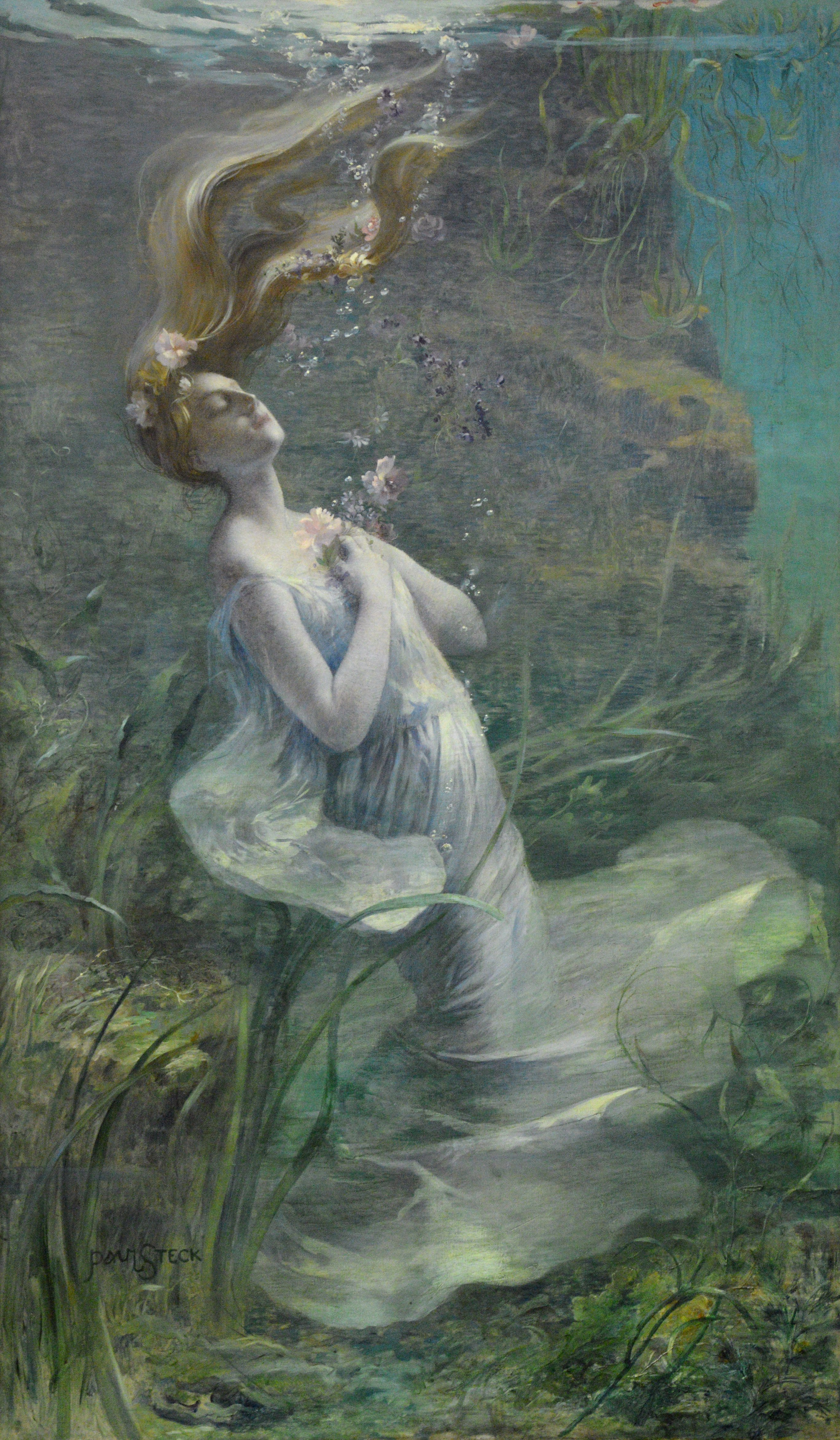
Ophelia (1895)

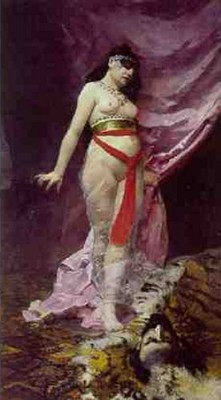
Judith (1885)

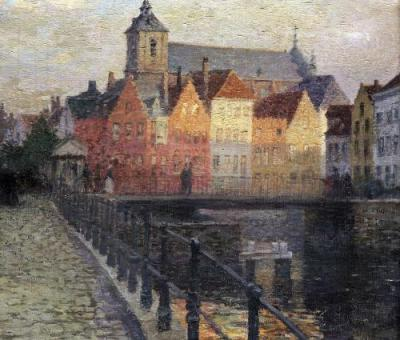
Quai de la Paille Brugespas
