= NHL Rock the Rink =

2000 video game

- Developer: EA Canada
- Publisher: Electronic Arts
- Platform: PlayStation
- Release: NA: March 22, 2000; EU: June 16, 2000
- Genre: Sports
- Modes: Single-player, multiplayer

NHL Rock the Rink is a video game developed by EA Canada and published by Electronic Arts for the PlayStation in 2000.

== Rosters ==
Team	Roster
Unlockable National Hockey League Teams
Mighty Ducks of Anaheim	Matt Cullen; Guy Hebert; Paul Kariya; Fredrik Olausson; Steve Rucchin; Teemu Selanne; Oleg Tverdovsky
Atlanta Thrashers	Andrew Brunette; Kelly Buchberger; Petr Buzek; Nelson Emerson; Ray Ferraro; Damian Rhodes; Patrik Stefan
Boston Bruins	Jason Allison; Ray Bourque; Anson Carter; Byron Dafoe; Steve Heinze; Sergei Samsonov; Joe Thornton
Buffalo Sabres	Stu Barnes; Curtis Brown; Dominik Hasek; Mike Peca; Geoff Sanderson; Miroslav Satan; Alexei Zhitnik
Calgary Flames	Valeri Bure; Rene Corbet; Grant Fuhr; Phil Housley; Jarome Iginla; Marc Savard; Cory Stillman
Carolina Hurricanes	Rod Brind'Amour; Ron Frances; Artus Irbe; Sami Kapanen; Andrei Kovalenko; Jeff O'Neill; Gary Roberts
Chicago Blackhawks	Tony Amonte; Eric Daze; Doug Gilmour; Bryan McCabe; Boris Mironov; Jocelyn Thibault; Alexei Zhamnov
Colorado Avalanche	Adam Deadmarsh; Chris Drury; Peter Forsberg; Milan Hejduk; Sandis Ozolinsh; Patrick Roy; Joe Sakic
Dallas Stars	Ed Belfour; Derian Hatcher; Brett Hull; Jere Lehtinen; Mike Modano; Joe Nieuwendyk; Sergei Zubov
Detroit Red Wings	Chris Chelios; Sergei Fedorov; Nicklas Lidstrom; Darren McCarty; Chris Osgood; Brendan Shanahan; Steve Yzerman
Edmonton Oilers	Bill Guerin; Rem Murray; Janne Niinimaa; Tommy Salo; Alexander Selivanov; Ryan Smyth; Doug Weight
Florida Panthers	Pavel Bure; Trevor Kidd; Viktor Kozlov; Scott Mellanby; Rob Niedermayer; Robert Svehla; Ray Whitney
Los Angeles Kings	Donald Audette; Rob Blake; Stephane Fiset; Glen Murray; Zigmund Palffy; Luc Robitaille; Jozef Stumpel
Montreal Canadiens	Shayne Corson; Jeff Hackett; Saku Koivu; Trevor Linden; Vladimir Malakhov; Martin Rucinsky; Brian Savage
Nashville Predators	Patrick Cote; Mike Dunham; Greg Johnson; Sergei Krivokrasov; David Legwand; Cliff Ronning; Kimmo Timonen
New Jersey Devils	Jason Arnott; Martin Brodeur; Scott Gomez; Bobby Holik; Claude Lemieux; Randy McKay; Petr Sykora
New York Islanders	Mariusz Czerkawski; Brad Isbister; Kenny Jonsson; Mats Lindgren; Roberto Luongo; Bill Muckalt; Gino Odjick
New York Rangers	Theoren Fleury; Adam Graves; Kevin Hatcher; Valeri Kamensky; Brian Leetch; Petr Nedved; Mike Richter
Ottawa Senators	Daniel Alfredsson; Radek Bonk; Marian Hossa; Joe Juneau; Shawn McEachern; Andre Roy; Ron Tugnutt
Philadelphia Flyers	Eric Desjardins; Daymond Langkow; John LeClair; Eric Lindros; Keith Primeau; Mark Rechhi; John Vanbiesbrouck
Phoenix Coyotes	Sean Burke; Travis Green; Jyrki Lumme; Teppo Numminen; Jeremy Roenick; Keith Tkachuk; Rick Tocchet
Pittsburgh Penguins	Matthew Barnaby; Tom Barrasso; Jaromir Jagr; Darius Kasparaitis; Alexei Kovalev; Robert Lang; German Titov
San Jose Sharks	Vincent Damphousse; Jeff Friesen; Patrick Marleau; Owen Nolan; Mike Ricci; Steve Shields; Gary Suter
St Louis Blues	Pavol Demitra; Michal Handzus; Al MacInnis; Chris Pronger; Roman Turek; Pierre Turgeon; Scott Young
Tampa Bay Lightning	Dan Cloutier; Chris Gratton; Vincent Lecavalier; Fredrik Modin; Mike Sillinger; Petr Svoboda; Darcy Tucker
Toronto Maple Leafs	Bryan Berard; Sergei Berezin; Tie Domi; Curtis Joseph; Yanic Perrault; Mats Sundin; Steve Thomas
Vancouver Canucks	Todd Bertuzzi; Donald Brashear; Mark Messier; Alexander Mogilny; Markus Naslund; Mattias Ohlund; Felix Potvin
Washington Capitals	Peter Bondra; Jan Bulis; Olaf Kolzig; Steve Konowalchuck; Andrei Nikolishin; Adam Oates; Chris Simon
Fantasy Teams
Brigade	Carl Cadet; Ken Cavalry; Fred Foxhole; Pierre Platoon; Sid Soldier; Tom Tankster; Teddy Trooper
Cabbies	Brian Brakes; Cory Crash; Harvey Hittenrun; Red Lightrunner; Reed Speeder; Ted Tailgaiter; Trent Taximan
Demolition	Frank Boomer; Chris Crumble; Bill Dozer; Dan Dynamitilis; Sylvain Smasher; Ed Splosion; Rich Wrecker
Demons	Ben Brimstone; Dan Demoniski; Jimmy Devlin; Damian Diablo; Hans Helldweller; Paul O'Darkness; B.L. Zebub
Gangsters	Donny Danger; Gord Father; Lenny Knuckles; Dirk Launder; Lorn Shark; Sebastien Stopper; Bart Wiseguy
Psycho Delics	Boutros Boutrous Goalie; Dave Deadhead; Fred Flowers; Joe Friendly; Hank Hippie; Chuck Le Dude; Pete Peacenik
Rattlers	Colin Cactusson; Kurt Cowboy; Shep Deputy; Howard Hoss; Steve Saddler; Sam Sheriff; Ted Tumbleweed
Sting	Bart Baconowski; Fuzz Copper; Harold Cuffs; Dick Doughnutson; Ned Nightstick; Roland Rookie; Wayne Wardn
Reapers	Dirk Deadman; Fred Flatliner; Gary Graveyard; Roger Mortis; Steve Scythe; Sami Skeleton; Fess Undertaker

== Reception ==
Reception

Aggregate score
Aggregator	Score
GameRankings	82%

Review scores
Publication	Score
AllGame	3.5/5
CNET Gamecenter	7/10
Electronic Gaming Monthly	7/10 (Note: Four critics of Electronic Gaming Monthly gave the game each a score of 8.5/10, 6/10, 6.5/10, and 7/10.)
EP Daily	9/10
Game Informer	8/10
GameFan	60% (Note: In GameFan's viewpoint of the game, one critic gave it 57, and the other 63.)
GameSpot	8.8/10
IGN	8/10
Next Generation	4/5
Official U.S. PlayStation Magazine	4/5
PlayStation: The Official Magazine	3.5/5
USA Today	3/4

The game received "favorable" reviews according to the review aggregation website GameRankings. Jeff Lundrigan of NextGen said it was "One of the rare 'extreme' sports parodies that offers as much depth as laughs."

The D-Pad Destroyer of GamePro said of the game in one review, "It may not be pretty, but it gets the job done. Rock the Rink is a fast and nasty hockey slam that should satisfy gamers who just want to hit and score. Simply put, Rock the Rink rocks." (Note: GamePro gave the game 3.5/5 for graphics, and three 4.5/5 scores for sound, control, and fun factor in one review.) In another, however, Air Hendrix said that the game "definitely won't attract the huge audience that Blitz did, but it's an enjoyable frantic take on hockey. If you're a fan of Midway's Open Ice series, RTR is gonna blow you away. If not, the game's less-than-mainstream appeal means you should rent before buying." (Note: GamePro gave the game 3/5 for graphics, 5/5 for sound, 4/5 for control, and 3.5/5 for fun factor in another review.)
