= Grammy Award for Best Rock Performance by a Duo or Group with Vocal =

Music award

- Awarded for: quality rock song performances by a duo or group with vocals
- Country: United States
- Presented by: National Academy of Recording Arts and Sciences
- First award: 1980
- Final award: 2011
- Website: grammy.com

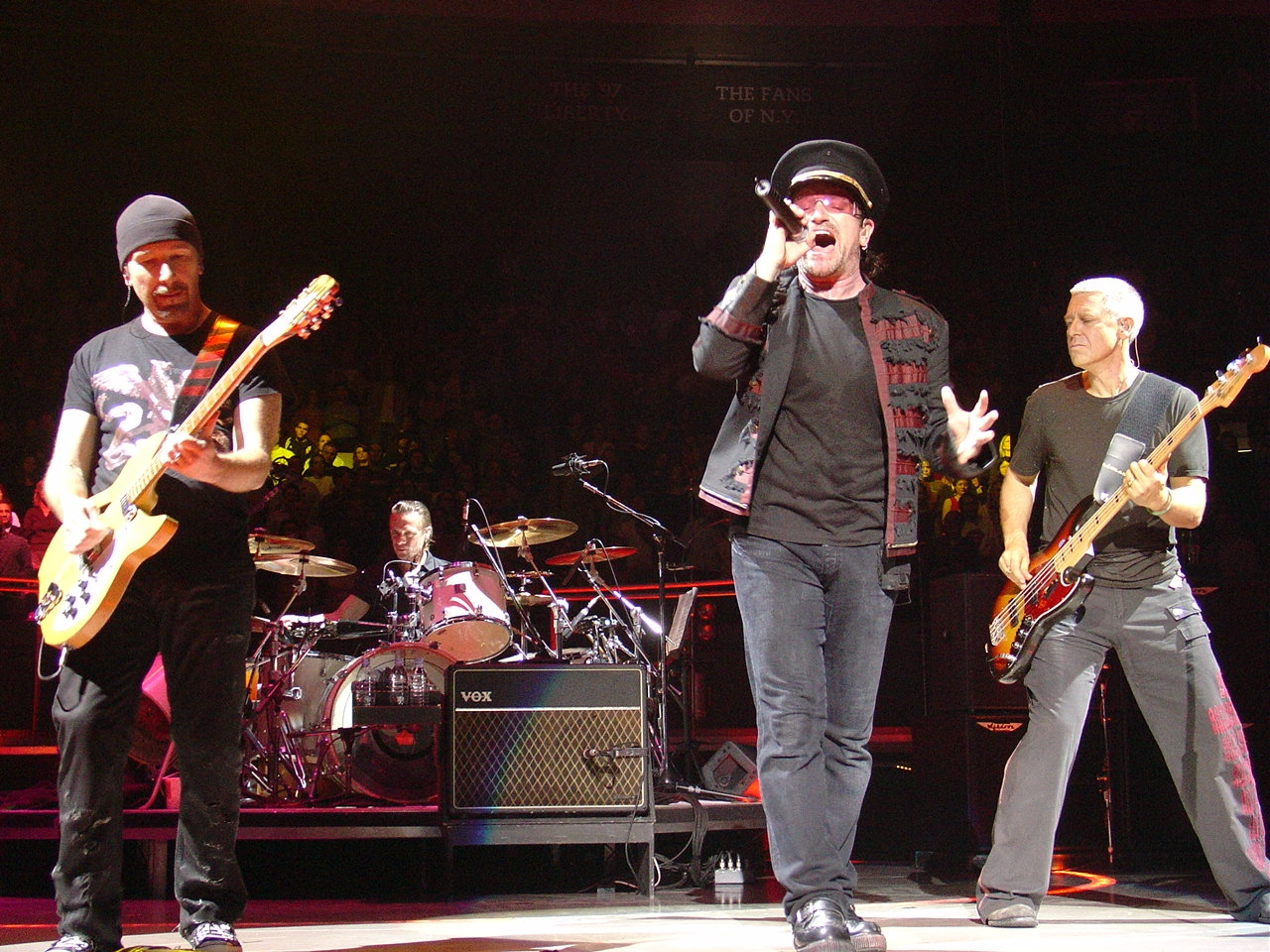
U2 on 'Vertigo Tour' concert, November 2005, Madison Square Gardens, New York

The Grammy Award for Best Rock Performance by a Duo or Group with Vocal was awarded between 1980 and 2011.

The award was discontinued after the 2011 award season in a major overhaul of Grammy categories. Beginning in 2012, all solo or duo/group performances (including instrumental performance) in the rock category were shifted to the newly formed Best Rock Performance category.

U2 holds the record for most awards with a total of seven, followed by Aerosmith with a total of four.

== Recipients ==
Year^{[I]}	Performing artist(s)	Work	Nominees	Ref.
1980	Eagles	"Heartache Tonight"	The Blues Brothers – Briefcase Full of Blues; The Cars – Candy-O; Dire Straits – "Sultans of Swing"; The Knack – "My Sharona"; Styx – Cornerstone	
1981	Bob Seger & the Silver Bullet Band	Against the Wind	Blondie – "Call Me"; Pink Floyd – The Wall; The Pretenders – "Brass in Pocket"; Queen – "Another One Bites the Dust"	
1982	The Police	"Don't Stand So Close to Me"	Foreigner – 4; Stevie Nicks with Tom Petty and the Heartbreakers – "Stop Draggin' My Heart Around"; REO Speedwagon – Hi Infidelity; The Rolling Stones – Tattoo You	
1983	Survivor	"Eye of the Tiger"	Asia – Asia; The J. Geils Band – "Centerfold"; Kenny Loggins featuring Steve Perry – "Don't Fight It"; Frank Zappa and Moon Zappa – "Valley Girl"	
1984	The Police	Synchronicity	Big Country – "In a Big Country"; Huey Lewis and the News – "Heart and Soul"; Talking Heads – "Burning Down the House"; ZZ Top – Eliminator	
1985	Prince and the Revolution	Purple Rain	The Cars – Heartbeat City; Genesis – Genesis; Van Halen – "Jump"; Yes – 90125	
1986	Dire Straits	"Money for Nothing"	Bryan Adams with Tina Turner – "It's Only Love"; Eurythmics – "Would I Lie to You?"; Heart – Heart; Starship – "We Built This City"	
1987	Eurythmics	"Missionary Man"	Artists United Against Apartheid – "Sun City"; The Fabulous Thunderbirds – "Tuff Enuff"; The Rolling Stones – "Harlem Shuffle"; ZZ Top – Afterburner	
1988	U2	The Joshua Tree	Georgia Satellites – "Keep Your Hands to Yourself"; Heart – Bad Animals; Los Lobos – By the Light of the Moon; Yes – Big Generator	
1989	U2	"Desire"	INXS – Kick; Joan Jett and the Blackhearts – "I Hate Myself for Loving You"; Little Feat – Let It Roll; Midnight Oil – "Beds Are Burning"	
1990	Traveling Wilburys	Traveling Wilburys Vol. 1	Living Colour – "Glamour Boys"; The Rolling Stones – "Mixed Emotions"; U2 – Rattle and Hum; U2 with B. B. King – "When Love Comes to Town"	
1991	Aerosmith	"Janie's Got a Gun"	INXS – "Suicide Blonde"; Midnight Oil – Blue Sky Mining; Red Hot Chili Peppers – "Higher Ground"; The Rolling Stones – "Almost Hear You Sigh"	
1992	Bonnie Raitt with Delbert McClinton	"Good Man, Good Woman"	Jane's Addiction – "Been Caught Stealing"; Tom Petty & the Heartbreakers – Into the Great Wide Open; Queensrÿche – "Silent Lucidity"; R.E.M. – "Radio Song"	
1993	U2	Achtung Baby	En Vogue - "Free Your Mind"; Little Village – Little Village; Los Lobos – Kiko; Red Hot Chili Peppers – "Under the Bridge"	
1994	Aerosmith	"Livin' on the Edge"	Blind Melon – "No Rain"; Bob Dylan, Roger McGuinn, Tom Petty, Neil Young, Eric Clapton and George Harrison – "My Back Pages"; Soul Asylum – "Runaway Train"; Spin Doctors – "Two Princes"	
1995	Aerosmith	"Crazy"	Counting Crows – "Round Here"; Green Day – "Basket Case"; Nirvana – "All Apologies"; Pearl Jam – "Daughter"	
1996	Blues Traveler	"Run-Around"	Eagles – "Hotel California"; Dave Matthews Band – "What Would You Say"; Page and Plant – "Kashmir"; U2 – "Hold Me, Thrill Me, Kiss Me, Kill Me"	
1997	Dave Matthews Band	"So Much to Say"	Garbage – "Stupid Girl"; Oasis – "Wonderwall"; The Smashing Pumpkins – "1979"; The Wallflowers – "6th Avenue Heartache"	
1998	The Wallflowers	"One Headlight"	Aerosmith – "Falling in Love (Is Hard on the Knees)"; Fleetwood Mac – "The Chain"; Matchbox Twenty – "Push"; Dave Matthews Band – "Crash into Me"	
1999	Aerosmith	"Pink"	Fastball – "The Way"; Hole – "Celebrity Skin"; The Verve – "Bitter Sweet Symphony"; The Wallflowers – "Heroes"	
2000	Santana featuring Everlast	"Put Your Lights On"	Garbage – "Special"; Goo Goo Dolls – "Black Balloon"; Hole – "Malibu"; Red Hot Chili Peppers – "Scar Tissue"	
2001	U2	"Beautiful Day"	Bon Jovi – "It's My Life"; Creed – "With Arms Wide Open"; Foo Fighters – "Learn to Fly"; Red Hot Chili Peppers – "Californication"	
2002	U2	"Elevation"	Aerosmith – "Jaded"; Coldplay – "Yellow"; Dave Matthews Band – "The Space Between"; Train – "Drops of Jupiter"	
2003	Coldplay	"In My Place"	Aerosmith – "Girls of Summer"; Creed – "My Sacrifice"; Chad Kroeger featuring Josey Scott – "Hero"; 3 Doors Down – "When I'm Gone"; Tonic – "Take Me As I Am"; U2 – "Walk On"	
2004	Warren Zevon featuring Bruce Springsteen	"Disorder in the House"	Foo Fighters – "Times Like These"; Radiohead – "There There"; Train – "Calling All Angels"; The White Stripes – "Seven Nation Army"	
2005	U2	"Vertigo"	Elvis Costello and The Imposters – "Monkey to Man"; Franz Ferdinand – "Take Me Out"; Green Day – "American Idiot"; The Killers – "Somebody Told Me"	
2006	U2	"Sometimes You Can't Make It on Your Own"	Coldplay – "Speed of Sound"; Foo Fighters – "Best of You"; Franz Ferdinand – "Do You Want To"; The Killers – "All These Things That I've Done"	
2007	Red Hot Chili Peppers	"Dani California"	Coldplay – "Talk"; The Fray – "How to Save a Life"; The Raconteurs – "Steady, As She Goes"; U2 with Green Day – "The Saints Are Coming"	
2008	The White Stripes	"Icky Thump"	Daughtry – "It's Not Over"; Green Day – "Working Class Hero"; Nickelback – "If Everyone Cared"; U2 – "Instant Karma!"	
2009	Kings of Leon	"Sex on Fire"	AC/DC – "Rock 'n' Roll Train"; Coldplay – "Violet Hill"; Eagles – "Long Road Out of Eden"; Radiohead – "House of Cards"	
2010	Kings of Leon	"Use Somebody"	Eric Clapton and Steve Winwood – "Can't Find My Way Home"; Coldplay – "Life in Technicolor II"; Green Day – "21 Guns"; U2 – "I'll Go Crazy If I Don't Go Crazy Tonight"	
2011	The Black Keys	"Tighten Up"	Arcade Fire – "Ready to Start"; Jeff Beck featuring Joss Stone – "I Put a Spell on You"; Kings of Leon – "Radioactive"; Muse – "Resistance"	

- ^{^[I]} Each year is linked to the article about the Grammy Awards held that year.

== Multiple wins ==
7 wins

- U2

4 wins

- Aerosmith

2 wins

- The Police
- Kings of Leon

== Multiple nominations ==
14 nominations

- U2

7 nominations

- Aerosmith

6 nominations

- Coldplay

5 nominations

- Red Hot Chili Peppers
- Green Day

4 nominations

- The Rolling Stones
- Dave Matthews Band

3 nominations

- Eagles
- The Wallflowers
- Foo Fighters
- Kings of Leon

2 nominations

- The Cars
- Dire Straits
- The Police
- Tom Petty and the Heartbreakers
- ZZ Top
- Yes
- Eurythmics
- Heart
- Los Lobos
- INXS
- Midnight Oil
- Eric Clapton
- Garbage
- Hole
- Creed
- Train
- Radiohead
- The White Stripes
- Franz Ferdinand
- The Killers

== See also ==
- List of Grammy Award categories
