= Steamboat Ditch =

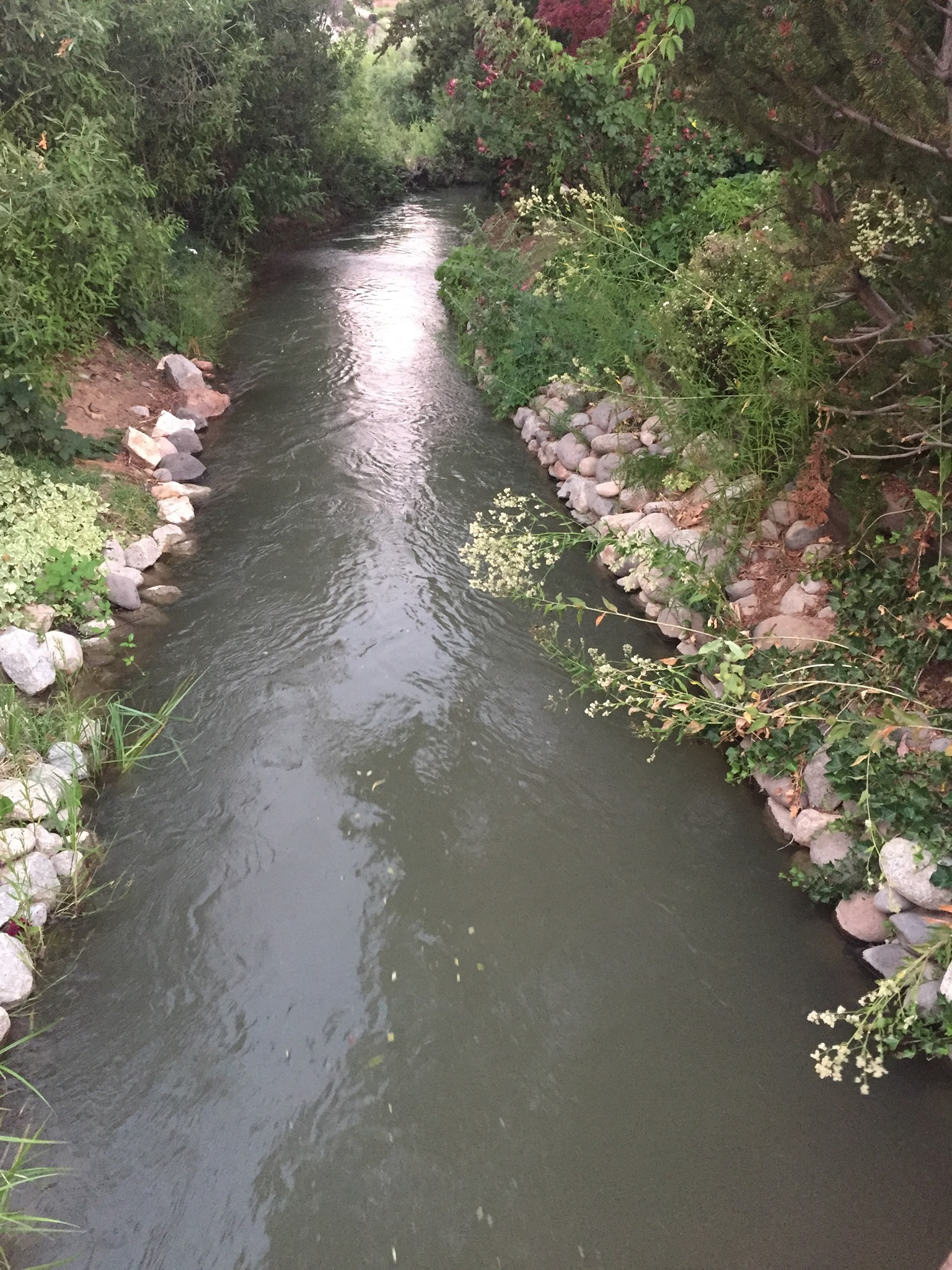

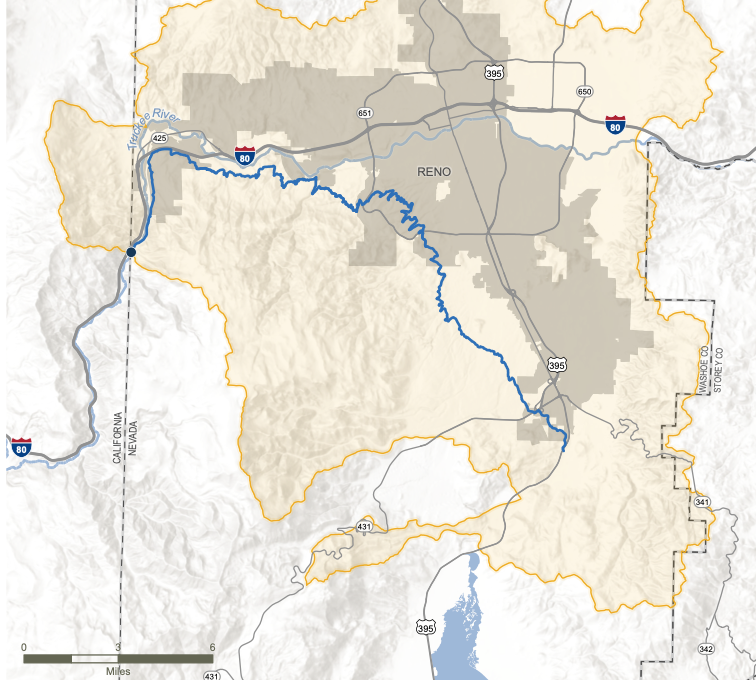
- Map of the Steamboat Ditch

Location
- Country: United States
- State: Nevada
- County: Washoe County, Nevada

Physical characteristics
- Length: 34 mi (55 km)
- Discharge
  - average: 50 cu ft/s (1.4 m^{3}/s)

Steamboat Ditch is a roughly 34-mile-long irrigation canal dug in the late 1870s by Chinese laborers. It begins at the Nevada and California state line and joins Steamboat Creek in south Reno.

== Geography ==
This irrigation canal and adjoining access road is relatively flat with a slight declining grade of about 1/660 from its origin. The vast majority of the ditch is open earth and flanked by various specious of vegetation. The access road or "trail" flanking the canal is predominately dirt.

== History ==
In 1877, the Truckee & Steamboat Irrigating Canal Company was organized to construct the Steamboat Ditch (Townley 1983: 13 7-138). Upon completion, it was the longest and most complicated ditch in the Truckee Meadows area. The total length of the ditch is 33–48 miles in length, depending on the source (cf., Angel 1958:634; Townley 1983: 138).

According to the Territorial Enterprise (17 May 1878:2), the ditch company awarded the construction contract to the Chinese firm Quong Yee Wo & Company of San Francisco, California, with a bid of $36,000. Other bidders included Chinese and European-American firms (Territorial Enterprise 17 May 1878:2). A conflicting report states that the San Francisco-based firm Lung Chung & Company received the contract to construct the ditch.

At the start of construction in 1878, 115 Chinese laborers were employed, including approximately six European-American supervisors (Territorial Enterprise 24 August 1878:2; Townley 1983:138). The following year, the number of men increased to between 150 and 200 Chinese, with additional workmen expected. Due to incidental expenses, projected construction costs increased to $40,000. By that time, construction had progressed 10 miles from the ditch's head on the Truckee River. When completed, the ditch would terminate between Brown's Station and Steamboat Springs in south Truckee Meadows (Territorial Enterprise 1 March 1879:2).

Due to frozen ground in Verdi, west of Reno, the projected construction period was increased and the contract period extended for an additional two months to 1 August 1879. A contemporary news report claimed, "This ditch is one of the largest and most important of the entire system of irrigation of Washoe County" (Territorial Enterprise 3 July 1879:3). Angel (1958:634) states the Steamboat Ditch was not completed until 1880, at a cost of more than $50,000. Townley (1983:138) provides an estimated price of $40,000. He also notes the winter of 1878–9 was particularly hard, requiring the use of dynamite in places. The Steamboat Canal was formally opened on July 1, 1880.

In 1885, the Truckee & Steamboat Springs Irrigation Canal came into financial trouble, eventually selling its holdings via auction in 1886. For the sum of $15,750, which covered the amount due, John C. Hampton was granted the sale by J. T. Emmitt, Sheriff of Washoe County, who conducted the auction on 10 February 1886. Hampton served as the executor of C. P. Hubbell, deceased, in the case involving the Steamboat Ditch. It was heard in the Seventh Judicial District Court of Nevada, which ordered the sale. The plaintiff in the case was George M. Mapes. The other defendants, besides Hubbell, included J.P. Foulks. The ditch was described as beginning 4 miles south of Verdi at the border of California and Nevada and continuing 31.25 miles to end approximately 2 miles from Steamboat Springs. All the water rights, privileges and easements of the ditch were included in the sale (Washoe County Records, Deeds Book 11 :398-400).

== Ownership ==
The Steamboat Canal and adjacent access road are now of mixed ownership among private landowners, homeowner associations, public utilities, private corporations, and state, city, county, and federal governments. The Steamboat Canal & Irrigation Co. has an irrigation easement to transport water through the ditch during the growing season.

== Recreational use ==
Large sections of the access road have remained open to the public since the canal's construction and have come to act as a de facto trail and urban green space. It is used by runners, walkers, bicycle riders, dog walkers, and bird watchers on a daily basis. However, owners of portions of the access road have for decades prohibited public access to their private property.

== 2021 pipeline proposal ==
In 2021, a proposal by the Washoe County Water Conservation District and the USDA's Natural Resources Conservation Service to replace a 14-mile stretch of the canal with an enclosed pipeline drew significant public opposition. Critics argued the project would eliminate open green space and harm the wildlife corridor. The Sierra Club's Great Basin Group described the access road as "one of the largest recreation resources in the Truckee Meadows." Following more than 1,500 emails and 150 voicemails submitted in opposition, the agencies formally terminated the initial environmental review in March 2021 to re-evaluate the project's feasibility and scope.

Residents opposing the pipeline proposal argued that the open ditch supports local wildlife and mature trees. One resident noted the water "provides nutrients and sustenance to all the old growth trees in the neighborhood, and all the wildlife we have in the area," expressing concern that enclosing the canal would eliminate these ecological benefits.

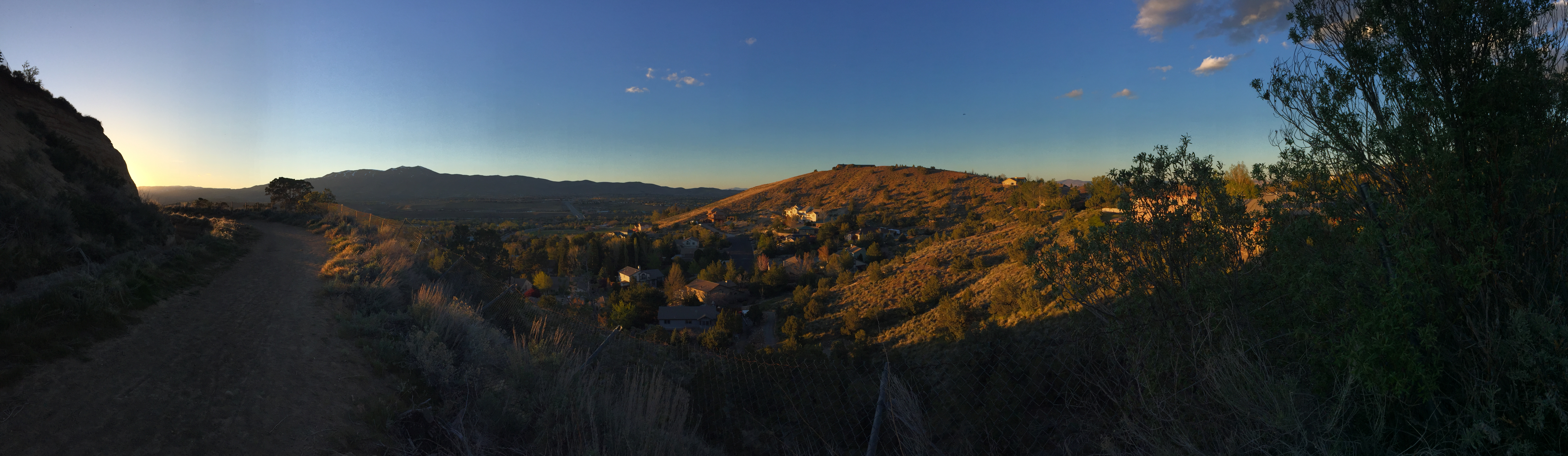
Steamboat Ditch Trail and West Reno in background

== Ecology ==
=== Observed species ===
Hundreds of plant and animal species have been observed along the Steamboat Ditch Trail. The ditch serves as an important water source during the summer months, when it carries irrigation water through the relatively inhospitable northwestern Great Basin Desert climate.

==== Birds ====
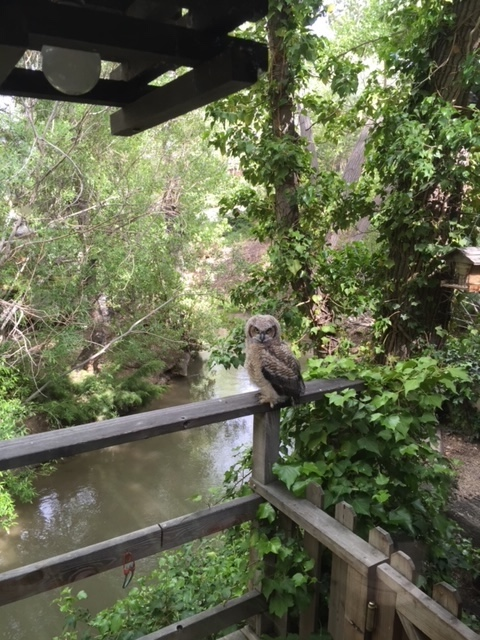
Owlet along Steamboat Ditch

- Mallard, Anas platyrhynchos
- Gadwall, Mareca strepera
- Song sparrow, Melospiza melodia
- Yellow-rumped warbler, Setophaga coronata
- Black-headed grosbeak, Pheucticus melanocephalus
- Black-chinned hummingbird, Archilochus alexandri
- Violet-green swallow, Tachycineta thalassina
- Tree swallow, Tachycineta bicolor
- Yellow warbler, Setophaga petechia
- Bullock's oriole, Icterus galbula
- Red-winged blackbird, Agelaius phoeniceus
- Western tanager, Piranga ludoviciana
- Wilson's warbler, Cardellina pusilla
- Cliff swallow, Petrochelidon pyrrhonota
- Hermit thrush, Catharus guttatus
- Belted kingfisher, Megaceryle alcyon
- Bewick's wren, Thryomanes bewickii
- Black-billed magpie, Pica hudsonia
- Cedar waxwing, Bombycilla cedrorum
- Bushtit, Psaltriparus minimus
- California quail, Callipepla californica
- White-crowned sparrow, Zonotrichia leucophrys
- Golden-crowned sparrow, Zonotrichia atricapilla
- Dark-eyed junco, Junco hyemalis
- Mountain chickadee, Poecile gambeli
- Townsend's solitaire, Myadestes townsendi
- Spotted towhee, Pipilo maculatus
- American robin, Turdus migratorius
- California scrub jay, Aphelocoma californica
- Common raven, Corvus corax
- Great horned owl, Bubo virginianus
- American barn owl, Tyto furcata
- Cooper's hawk, Accipiter cooperii
- Sharp-shinned hawk, Accipiter striatus
- Rufous hummingbird, Selasphorus rufus
- Anna's hummingbird, Calypte anna
- Broad-tailed hummingbird, Selasphorus platycercus
- Orange-crowned warbler, Leiothlypis celata
- Barn swallow, Hirundo rustica
- Red-tailed hawk, Buteo jamaicensis
- Northern flicker, Colaptes auratus
- House wren, Troglodytes aedon
- Lesser goldfinch, Spinus psaltria
- American goldfinch, Spinus tristis
- Pine siskin, Spinus pinus
- Ruby-crowned kinglet, Corthylio calendula
- Steller's jay, Cyanocitta stelleri
- American kestrel, Falco sparverius
- Peregrine falcon, Falco peregrinus
- Merlin, Falco columbarius
- Red-breasted sapsucker, Sphyrapicus ruber
- Red-naped sapsucker, Sphyrapicus nuchalis
- Mourning dove, Zenaida macroura
- Eurasian collared dove, Streptopelia decaocto
- House finch, Haemorhous mexicanus
- Cassin's finch, Haemorhous cassinii
- Downy woodpecker, Picoides pubescens
- Red breasted nuthatch, Sitta canadensis
- Say's phoebe, Sayornis saya
- Brewer's blackbird, Euphagus cyanocephalus
- Northern mockingbird, Mimus polyglottos
- European starling, Sturnus vulgaris

==== Butterflies ====
- Sylvan hairstreak, Satyrium sylvinum
- Behr's hairstreak, Satyrium behrii
- Juniper hairstreak, Callophrys gryneus
- Lorquin's admiral, Limenitis lorquini
- Monarch butterfly, Danaus plexippus
- Mourning cloak butterfly, Nymphalis antiopa
- Western tiger swallowtail, Papilio rutulus
- Mylitta crescent, Phyciodes mylitta
- Common checkered skipper, Pyrgus communis
- Gray hairstreak, Strymon melinus
- Pygmy blue butterfly, Brephidium exile
- Orange sulfur butterfly, Colias eurytheme
- Woodland skipper, Ochlodes sylvanoides
- Great Basin wood-nymph, Cercyonis sthenele
- Fiery skipper, Hylephila phyleus
- Sachem skipper, Atalopedes campestris
- Cabbage white butterfly, Pieris rapae
- California tortoiseshell, Nymphalis californica
- Painted lady butterfly, Vanessa cardui

==== Bees and other insects ====
- Mining bees, Andrena
- Blue milkweed beetle, Chrysochus cobaltinus
- Milkweed beetles, Tetraopes
- Long horned bees, Melissodes
- Bumblebees, Bombus
- Honeybees, Apis mellifera
- Convergent ladybug, Hippodamia convergens

==== Reptiles and amphibians ====
- Sierra chorus frog, Pseudacris sierra
- Terrestrial garter snake, Thamnophis elegans
- Western fence lizard, Sceloporus occidentalis
- North American racer, Coluber constrictor
- Gopher snake, Pituophis catenifer
- Rubber boa, Charina bottae
- Western toad, Bufo boreas

==== Mammals ====
- Montane vole, Microtus montanus
- Coyote, Canis latrans
- Bobcat, Lynx rufus
- Black bear, Ursus americanus
- Mule deer, Odocoileus hemionus
- California ground squirrel, Otospermophilus beecheyi
- Grey squirrel, Sciurus griseus
- Least chipmunk, Tamias minimus
- American deer mouse, Peromyscus maniculatus
- Desert woodrat, Neotoma lepida
- Desert cottontail, Sylvilagus audubonii

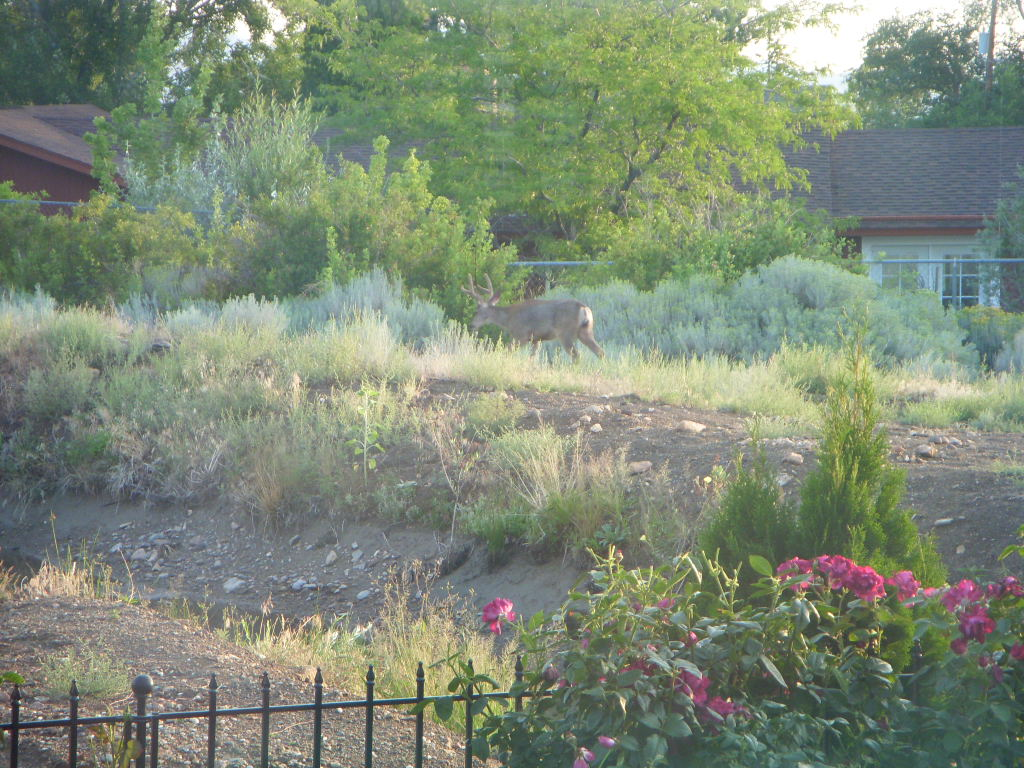
Mule deer along Steamboat Ditch

==== Trees and shrubs ====
- Fremont cottonwood, Populus fremontii
- Mountain alder, Alnus incana subsp. tenuifolia
- Coyote willow, Salix exigua
- Yellow willow, Salix lutea
- Wood's rose, Rosa woodsii
- California mugwort, Artemisia douglasiana
- Common mugwort, Artemisia ludoviciana
- Chokecherry, Prunus virginiana
- Jeffrey pine, Pinus jeffreyi
- Curl-leaf mountain mahogany, Cercocarpus ledifolius
- Antelope bitterbrush, Purshia tridentata
- Desert peach, Prunus andersonii
- Pinyon pine, Pinus monophylla
- Green ephedra, Ephedra viridis
- Wyoming sagebrush, Artemisia tridentata var. wyomingensis
- Rubber rabbitbrush, Ericameria nauseosa

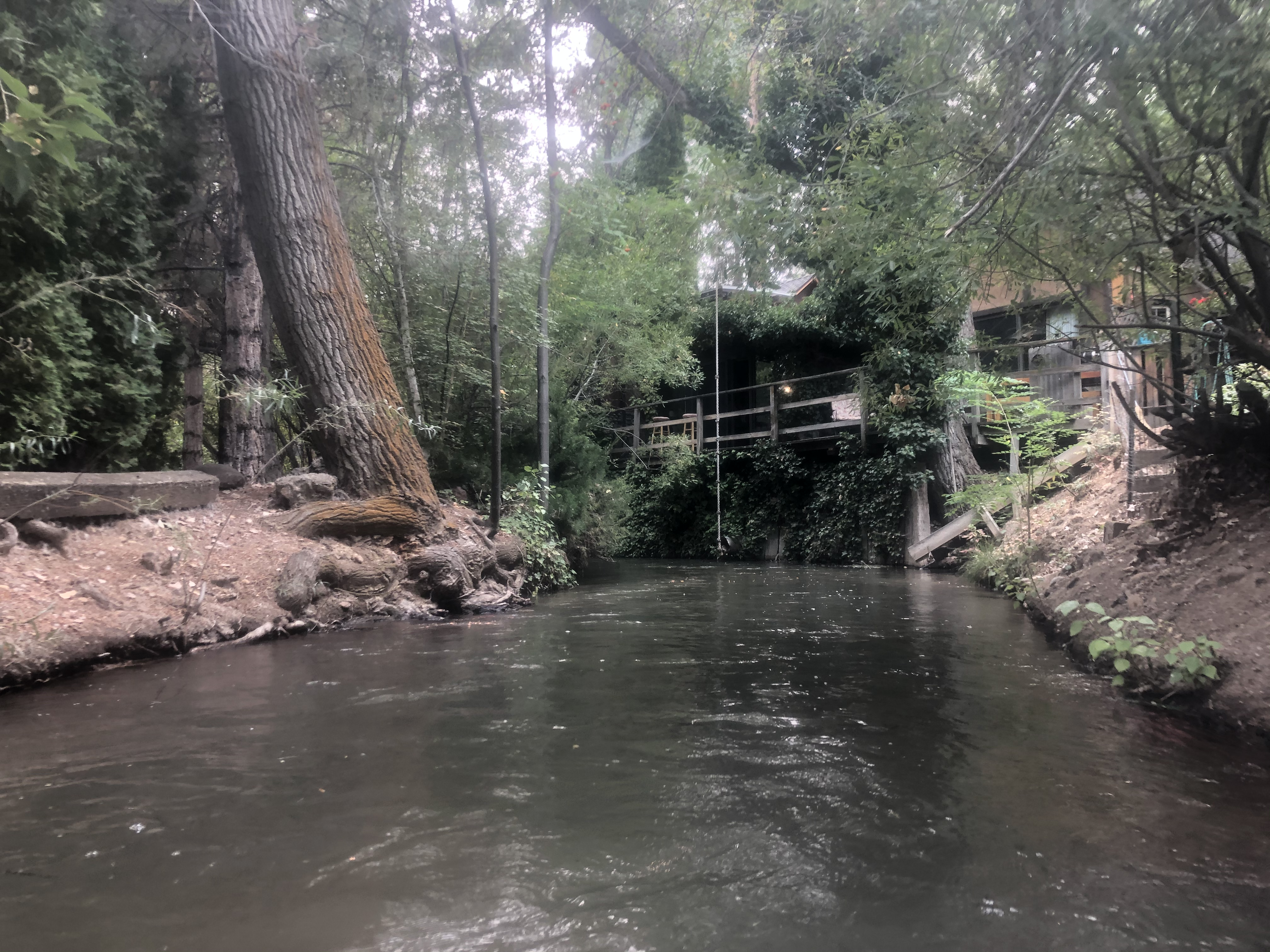
Mature Fremont cottonwood along the Steamboat Ditch

==== Wildflowers and grasses ====
- Narrowleaf milkweed, Asclepias fascicularis
- Showy milkweed, Asclepias speciosa
- Soft rush, Juncus effusus
- Baltic rush, Juncus balticus
- Bulrush, Scirpus
- Hooker's evening primrose, Oenothera elata
- Velvety goldenrod, Solidago velutina
- Western goldenrod, Solidago lepida
- Western goldentop, Euthamia occidentalis
- Creeping wildrye, Leymus triticoides
- Smoothstem blazingstar, Mentzelia laevicaulis
- Daggerpod, Phoenicaulis cheiranthoides
- Woolypod milkvetch, Astragalus purshii
- Nevada pea, Lathyrus lanszwertii
- Palmer's penstemon, Penstemon palmeri
- Roezeli's penstemon, Penstemon roezlii
- Prickly poppy, Argemone munita
- Dusty maiden, Chaenactis douglasii
- Great Basin wild rye, Leymus cinereus
- Squirrel tail, Elymus elymoides
- Veatches' blazingstar, Mentzelia veatchina
- Indian rice grass, Achnatherum hymenoides
