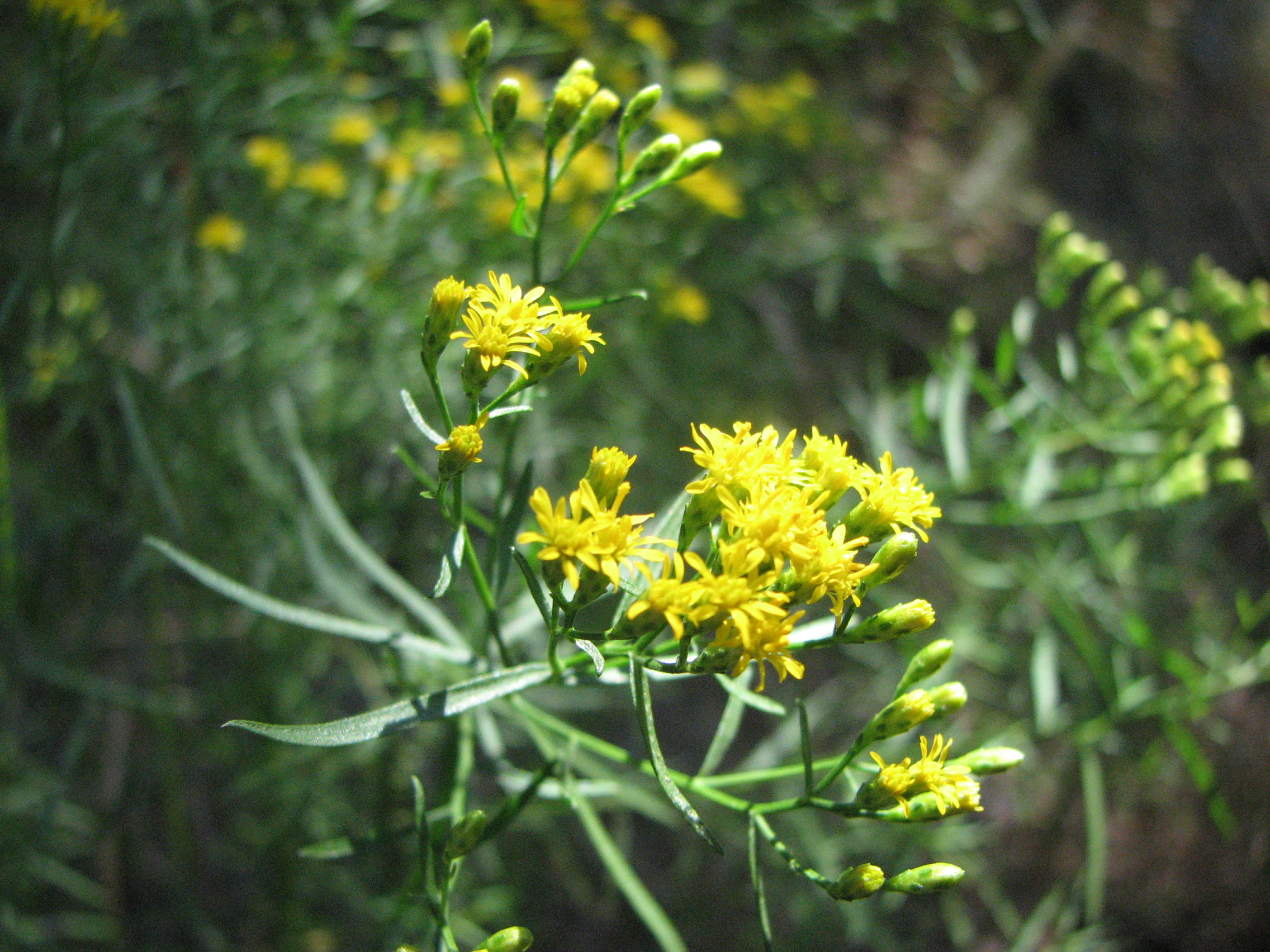

Scientific classification
- Kingdom: Plantae
- Clade: Tracheophytes
- Clade: Angiosperms
- Clade: Eudicots
- Clade: Asterids
- Order: Asterales
- Family: Asteraceae
- Genus: Euthamia
- Species: E. caroliniana

Binomial name
- Euthamia caroliniana (L.) Greene ex Porter & Britton

= Euthamia caroliniana =

Species of flowering plant

Euthamia caroliniana, known as Carolina grass-leaved goldenrod or slender goldentop is a flowering plant in the genus Euthamia, a member of the family Asteraceae. It is listed as Vulnerable due to habitat loss and disturbance within its range.

== Distribution ==
Euthamia caroliniana is found primarily on the Atlantic Coastal Plain between Nova Scotia and eastern Texas. It also has populations in the Great Lakes region and around Lake Champlain. Inland populations are also known from Indiana to Kentucky. Within its range, it can be found in open sandy areas, such as powerline cuts in pine barrens.

== Identification ==
Carolina goldentop grows up to 1 meter (3 ft 3 in) in height from a branched, creeping rhizome.

Along the east coast, the only similar-looking species is grass-leaved goldentop, which has wider leaves with one to three conspicuous veins (versus narrow leaves with only one vein in Carolina goldentops).

Its range also overlaps with Great Plains goldentop in the western Great Lakes and along Gulf Coast and bushy goldentop along the Gulf Coast.

=== Galls ===
This species is host to the following insect induced galls:

- Asteromyia euthamiae Gagné, 1968 This midge forms black spots on leaf blades
- Rhopalomyia fusiformae Felt, 1907 Small galls by a fly larvae on leaves, stems and flowers.

external link to gallformers

== Ecology ==
E. caroliniana grows in a range of habitats such as moist forests, pastures, roadsides, ditches, and other disturbed areas

It forms a persistent soil seed bank, which can persist through fire disturbance.
