= Western goldenrod =

Western goldenrod is a common name for several plants and may refer to:

- Euthamia occidentalis
- Solidago lepida, native to North America
