= Steamboat Creek (Nevada) =

Creek in the American state of Nevada

Coordinates: 39°31′15″N 119°42′10″W

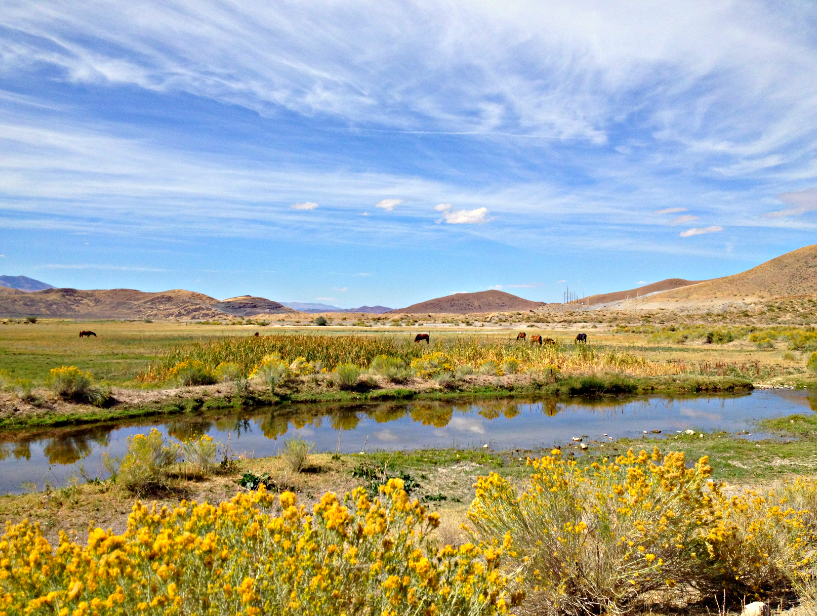
Steamboat Creek facing southwest toward the Truckee River. Steamboat Creek drains Washoe Lake from higher elevations to lower elevations running south to north. This is the Truckee Meadow where the creek runs through. Date of photo is Sept. 1, 2016 with wild Mustangs in background.

Steamboat Creek drains Washoe Lake, flowing north to northeast through Truckee Meadows and finally intersecting the Truckee River, east of Reno, Nevada. Historical documents indicate that in the early 1860s there were at least six mills reducing Comstock ore in Washoe Valley and during these earliest days of the Comstock mining.

The Steamboat Ditch, a 34 mi (55 km) irrigation canal constructed in 1880, diverts water from the Truckee River near the California-Nevada border and terminates at Steamboat Creek in south Reno. The ditch was built by Chinese laborers and remains in use for irrigation, delivering water to approximately 500 property owners.

Steamboat Springs near Galena also drains into Steamboat Creek which was the location of Castle Peak mine. Mercury can be found in tributaries of Steamboat Creek as a result of mining during the 1860s. Due to the difficulty of trans-porting both ore down from Virginia City and timber up the steep grade to Virginia City from Washoe City during the mid-1800s, especially in winter, the sites of extensive milling began to change and Carson City and the Carson River were sources for hauling ore down and lumber up to Virginia City during the mid-1860s

In the late 1800s, mills in the Washoe Lake area, Nevada, used mercury (Hg) to remove gold and silver from the ores of the Comstock deposit. Since that time, mercury has been found in Washoe Lake, down Steamboat Creek, and to the Truckee River. The creek continues to be a source of mercury to the Truckee River.

Studies have been conducted to determine concentrations of total and methylmercury (MeHg) in surface sediments in the Steamboat Creek watershed. Mercury concentrations measured in channel and bank sediments did not decrease downstream, indicating that mercury contamination has been distributed along the creek's length. Steamboat Creek flows past the newly built Reno Fire House and into the tributary of what is now Marsh Lands of Damonte Ranch Development. Both pond/wetland and channel sites exhibited making up Steamboat Creek show high potential for mercury.

The Truckee Meadows Water Reclamation Facility, the primary wastewater treatment plant for Reno and Sparks, discharges treated wastewater into Steamboat Creek in Sparks, just prior to the Creek's water's merging into the Truckee River. The wastewater plant's permitted processing capacity is 44 million gallons per day
