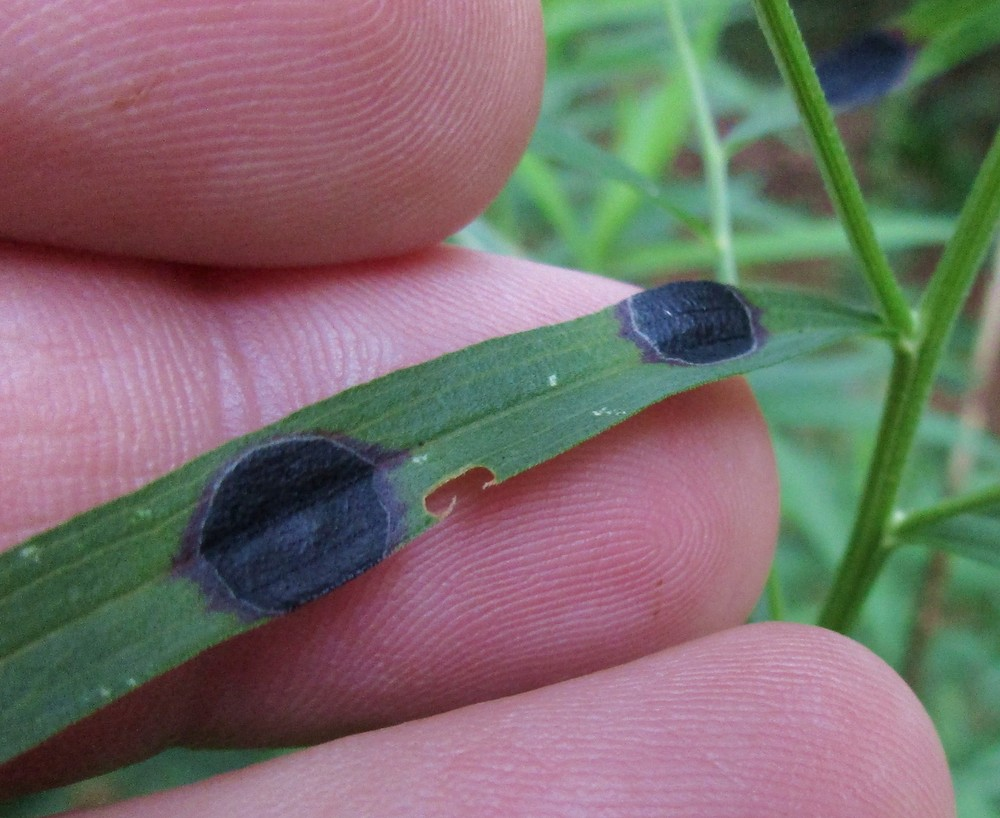
- Galls

Scientific classification
- Kingdom: Animalia
- Phylum: Arthropoda
- Class: Insecta
- Order: Diptera
- Family: Cecidomyiidae
- Genus: Asteromyia
- Species: A. euthamiae

Binomial name
- Asteromyia euthamiae Gagne, 1968

= Asteromyia euthamiae =

Species of fly

Asteromyia euthamiae is a species of gall midge in the family Cecidomyiidae. It was described as a new species in 1968 by the entomologist Raymond Gagné. It is widely distributed in northern North America, where it causes galls on Euthamia plants, including Euthamia caroliniana, Euthamia graminifolia, and Euthamia leptocephala. The galls are typically 3–10 mm (0.12–0.39 in) in length and vary in shape depending on the leaf width. They can be rounded, elliptical, or elongate-elliptical in appearance. The galls are usually black, but may have a distinctive narrow margin in shades of yellow, white, or purple.
