= Damonte Ranch High School =

Location
- 10500 Rio Wrangler Pkwy; Reno, NV 89521; 39.424036°N 119.713082°W

Information
- Type: Public
- Motto: Educate, Empower, Inspire
- Established: 2003
- School district: Washoe County School District
- Principal: Darvel Bell
- Staff: 73.50 (FTE)
- Grades: 9-12
- Enrollment: 1,738 (2024-2025)
- Student to teacher ratio: 23.65
- Colors: Green and Blue
- Athletics: 5A - Division 2
- Athletics conference: Sierra League
- Mascot: Mustang
- Rival: Galena High School
- Website: damonteranch.washoeschools.net

The Damonte Ranch High School (DRHS) opened in the Fall of 2003. Located in the Truckee Meadows, the school is the newest public high school in the Washoe County School District. Located in southeast Reno, the High School is named for the Damonte Ranch development during the rapid expansion of Reno NV. The Damonte Ranch High School DRHS opened as a combined middle school and high school, to help alleviate the overcrowding at Pine Middle School until Depoali Middle School was built. Depoali opened in 2009.

== Athletics ==
Damonte Ranch competes in the Sierra League of the Northern Nevada 4A Region (large school).

Damonte won its first state title in any sport when the girls' volleyball team defeated Las Vegas' Silverado High School in five games in 2006.

The Wrestling team were the 2007-2008 Northern Regional Champions.

The girls' swimming team, as well as both ski teams were the Sierra League Champions.

Damonte Ranch High School's boys Track & Field team won the 2008 Nevada state title.

The Baseball team had a 13-game winning streak in the beginning of the season, and in 2008 have had their first 20 win season in the history of that program.

The girls' track team claimed a share of the Region Championship in 2011.

The football field at Damonte is an artificial turf field, installed in 2006.

The swimming team at Damonte is small and generally does not place within the competitions.

The freshman cheer squad was undefeated at all competitions during the 2014–2015 season.

The marching band competes in the SNBS and won the governor's cup.

== Notable alumni ==
- Cade McNamara (class of 2018), quarterback for the Iowa Hawkeyes
