= Peleg Brown Ranch =

- U.S. National Register of Historic Places
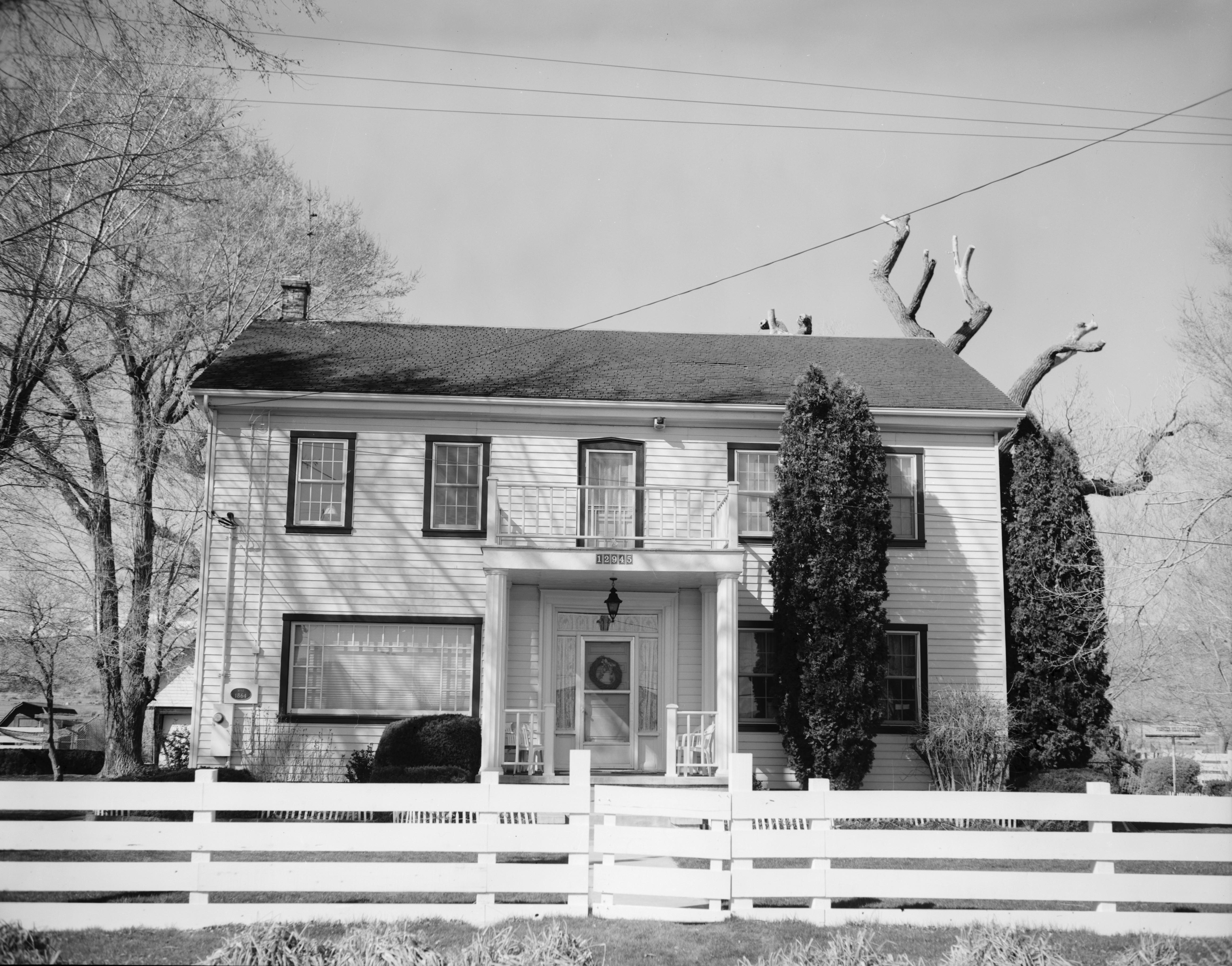

- Location within Nevada Location within the United States
- Location: 12945 Old Virginia Rd., Reno, Nevada
- Coordinates: 39°24′43″N 119°44′57″W
- Area: 4 acres (1.6 ha)
- Built: 1864
- Architectural style: Bungalow/craftsman, Greek Revival
- NRHP reference No.: 94001471
- Added to NRHP: December 23, 1994

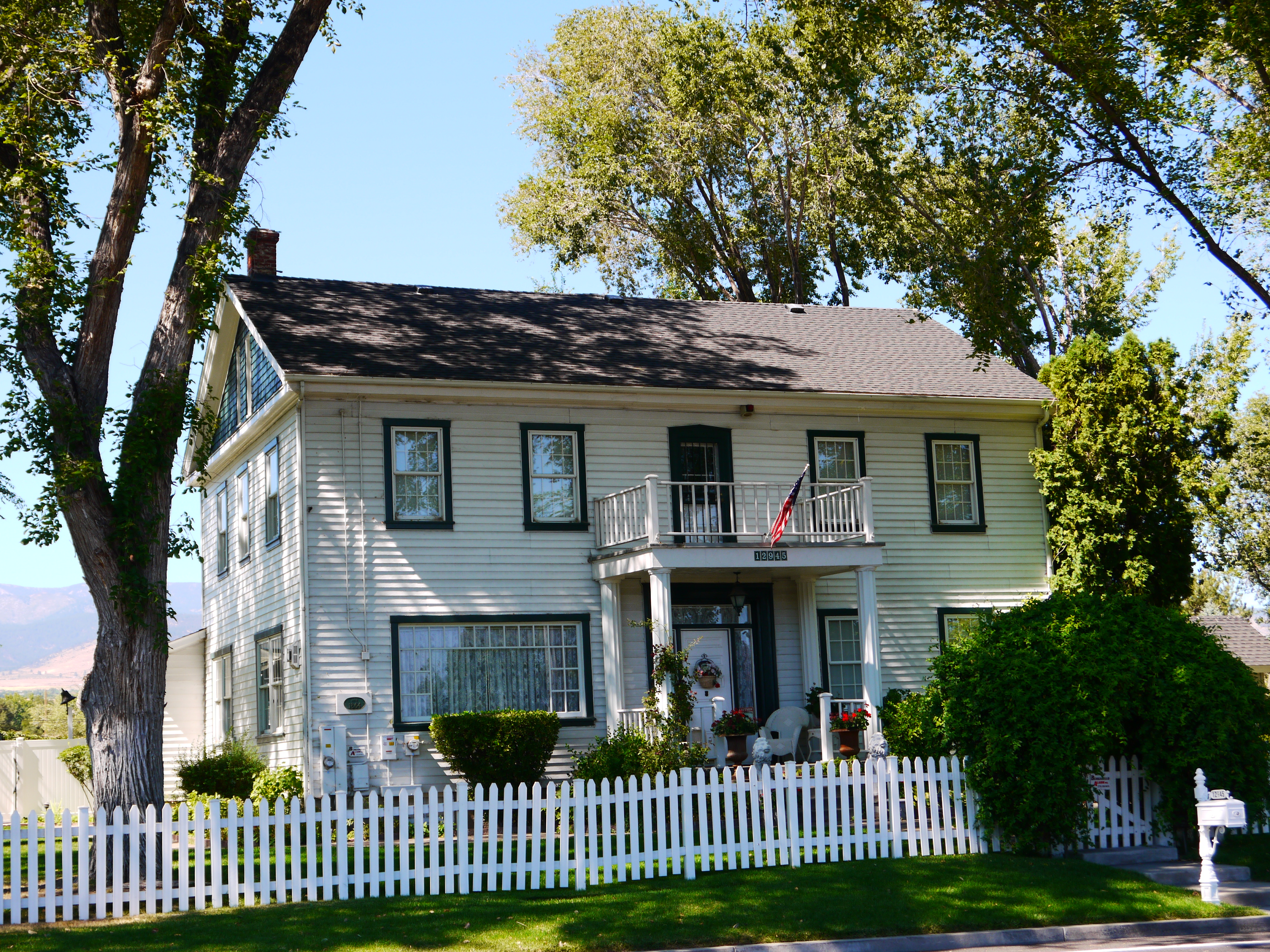
Detailed Image of the Damonte Ranch House 16MB. Click to see this home listed on the Register of Historical Landmarks for Nevada. Highway 395 was constructed curving around this property to protect this house. Image taken Sept 2016.

The Peleg Brown Ranch, at 12945 Old Virginia Rd. in Reno, Nevada, dates from 1864. Also known as the Louis Damonte Ranch, it includes Bungalow/craftsman and Greek Revival architecture. It was listed on the National Register of Historic Places in 1994; the listing included five contributing buildings on about 4 acres (1.6 ha).

The original Brown/Damonte Ranch included about 620 acres (250 ha) at the north end of Steamboat Valley, in the southern Truckee Meadows, roughly bounded by South Virginia Street (U.S. Highway 395) and Old Virginia Road on the sides.

1857 pioneer rancher Peleg Brown, a Rhode Island native arrived in the Truckee Meadows with his brother, Joshua. The two brothers introduced alfalfa to the Truckee Meadows and built their home and ranch 150 years ago which still stands today.

The main house was built in 1864 and has Greek Revival architecture; it was renovated in 1940 and in 1955. A play house, built around 1900, is a Craftsman-style 8-by-10-foot (2.4 m × 3.0 m) bungalow.

It was deemed significant "for its association with the development of agriculture and irrigation in the Truckee Meadows in the nineteenth and twentieth centuries", including its serving the Comstock Lode mining area. It served as a stagecoach stop, too.
