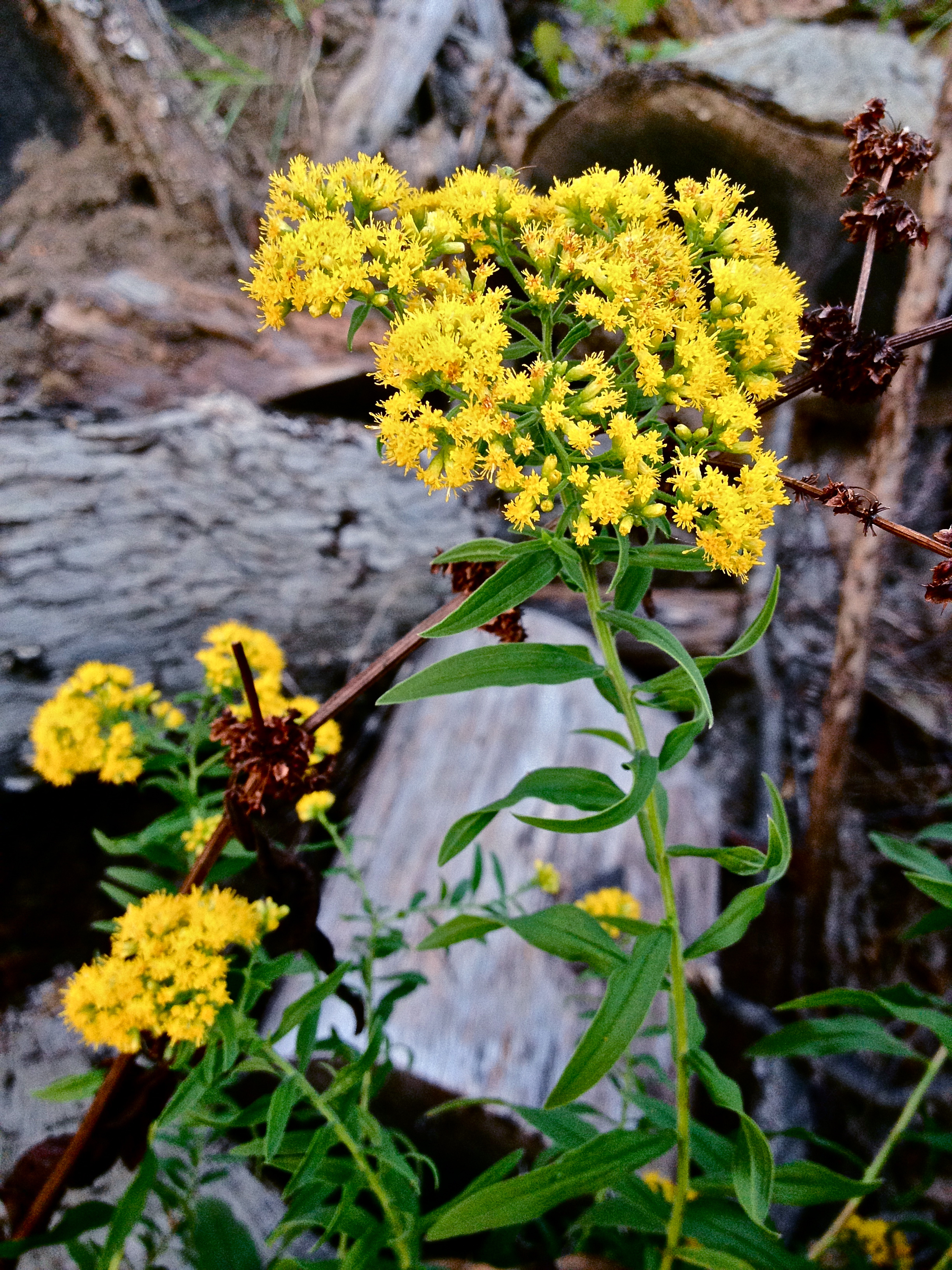
- Euthamia graminifolia, grass-leaved goldenrod

Scientific classification
- Kingdom: Plantae
- Clade: Tracheophytes
- Clade: Angiosperms
- Clade: Eudicots
- Clade: Asterids
- Order: Asterales
- Family: Asteraceae
- Subfamily: Asteroideae
- Tribe: Astereae
- Subtribe: Gutiereziinae
- Genus: Euthamia; Nutt. ex Cass.

Synonyms
- Solidago sect. Euthamia Nutt.

= Euthamia =

Genus of flowering plants

Euthamia is a genus of flowering plants in the family Asteraceae. They are known as goldentops and grass-leaved goldenrods.

The species were formerly classed in genus Solidago. They were separated on the basis of morphological differences, such as the arrangement of the flower heads in the inflorescence and the glands on the leaves, and of DNA data. Authors have recognized 5 to 10 species. They are native to North America, but certain species are introduced in Europe and Asia.

These species are quite variable in appearance, the variation often influenced by environmental conditions. In general, they are rhizomatous perennial herbs or subshrubs growing erect stems 0.4–2 m (1 ft 4 in – 6 ft 7 in) tall. The stems are hairy to hairless and branching or unbranched. The leaves are alternately arranged along the stem. They are linear to lance-shaped, smooth-edged, hairy to hairless, and gland-dotted, if sometimes sparsely. The flower heads are solitary or borne in a dense or spreading array. The back of the head is layered in phyllaries which may be resinous. There are 7 to 22 yellow ray florets, sometimes more, and several yellow disc florets. The fruit is a rough-textured cypsela tipped with a pappus of white bristles.

Euthamia species are used as food plants by the larvae of some Lepidoptera species including Coleophora intermediella, which feeds exclusively on E. graminifolia.

Species

- Euthamia caroliniana (syn. E. tenuifolia) – coastal plain goldentop, slender goldentop – Coastal Plain from Texas to Nova Scotia; also Great lakes region
- Euthamia graminifolia – common goldentop, flat-top goldentop – northern + eastern US, mostly Great Lakes and Northeast; much of Canada
- Euthamia gymnospermoides – Great Plains goldentop, Texas goldentop – Great Plains + Great Lakes from Texas to Ontario
- Euthamia leptocephala – Mississippi Valley goldentop, bushy goldentop – south-central US, Texas to Georgia to Illinois
- Euthamia minor – southeastern US
- Euthamia occidentalis – western goldentop, western goldenrod – western Canada, western half of US, northwestern Mexico
