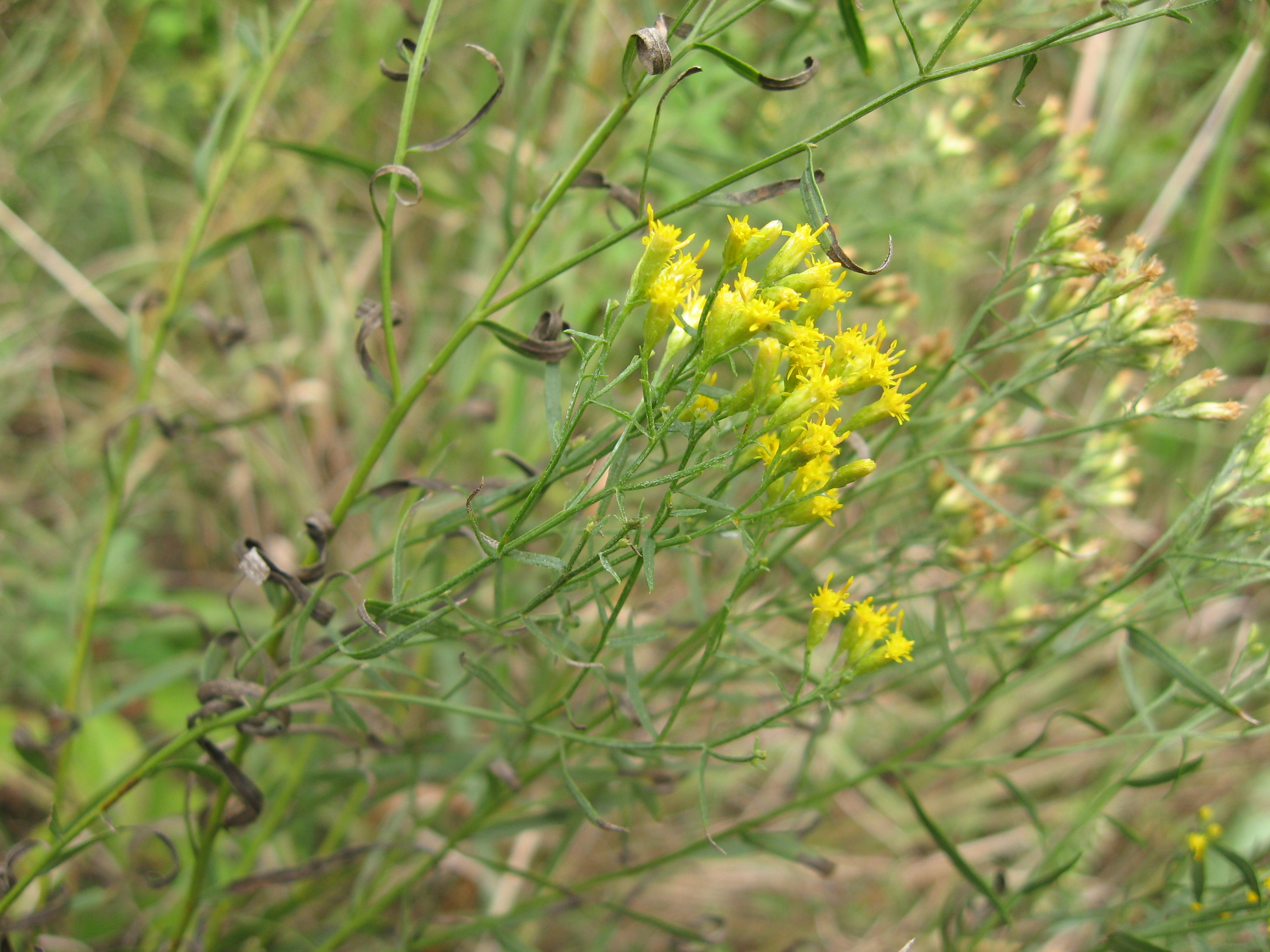

Conservation status
- Secure (NatureServe)

Scientific classification
- Kingdom: Plantae
- Clade: Tracheophytes
- Clade: Angiosperms
- Clade: Eudicots
- Clade: Asterids
- Order: Asterales
- Family: Asteraceae
- Genus: Euthamia
- Species: E. gymnospermoides

Binomial name
- Euthamia gymnospermoides Green

Synonyms
- Synonymy: Euthamia camporum Greene; Euthamia glutinosa Rydb.; Euthamia pulverulenta Greene; Solidago camporum (Greene) A.Nelson; Solidago chrysothamnoides (Greene) Bush; Solidago gymnospermoides (Greene) Fernald; Solidago media (Greene) Bush; Solidago perglabra Friesner; Solidago remota (Greene) Friesner; Solidago texensis Friesner

= Euthamia gymnospermoides =

Species of flowering plant

Euthamia gymnospermoides, with the common names Great Plains goldentop and Texas goldentop, is a plant in the family Asteraceae.

It is native primarily to the Great Plains and Great Lakes Region where it is found in prairies and sandy areas.

Euthamia gymnospermoides is a perennial that produces heads of yellow flowers in late summer. It is distinguished from the similar Euthamia graminifolia by having only one vein per leaf and larger flower heads.
