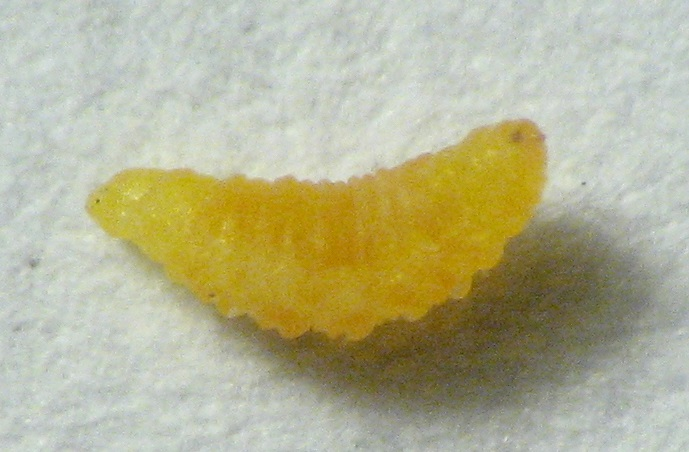
- Larva

Scientific classification
- Domain: Eukaryota
- Kingdom: Animalia
- Phylum: Arthropoda
- Class: Insecta
- Order: Diptera
- Family: Cecidomyiidae
- Genus: Dasineura
- Species: D. carbonaria

Binomial name
- Dasineura carbonaria (Felt, 1907)

Synonyms
- Dasyneura carbonaria Felt, 1907

= Dasineura carbonaria =

Species of fly

Dasineura carbonaria is a species of gall midges in the family Cecidomyiidae. It forms galls on Euthamia graminifolia.

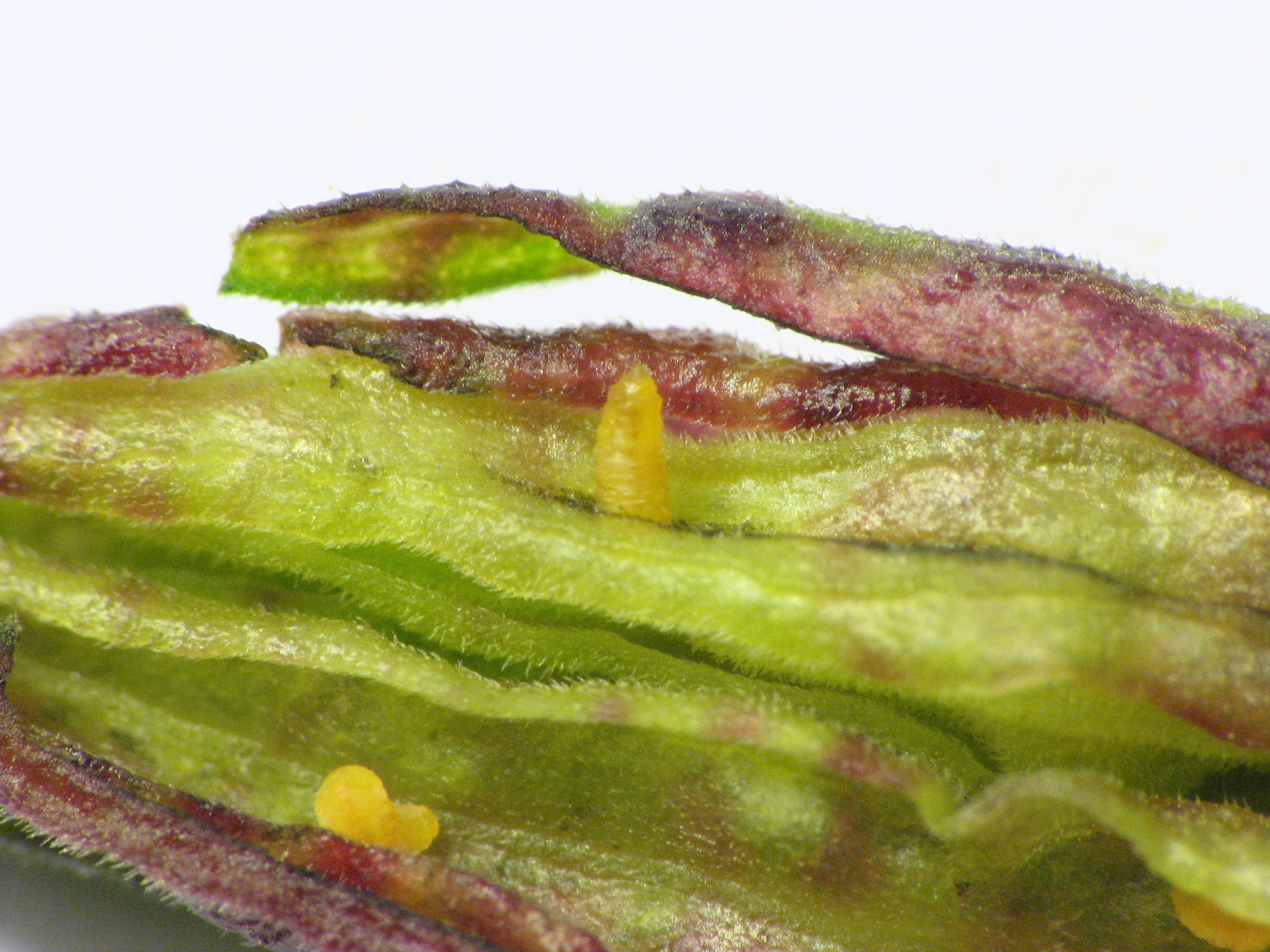
Gall on Euthamia graminifolia
