= Coleophora intermediella =

Scientific classification
- Kingdom: Animalia
- Phylum: Arthropoda
- Class: Insecta
- Order: Lepidoptera
- Family: Coleophoridae
- Genus: Coleophora
- Species: C. intermediella

Binomial name
- Coleophora intermediella McDunnough, 1940

Species of moth

Coleophora intermediella is a moth of the family Coleophoridae. It is found in Canada, including Nova Scotia and New Brunswick.

The larvae feed on the seeds of Solidago graminifolia. They create a trivalved, tubular silken case.
