= Damonte Ranch =

Coordinates: 39.41244°N 119.75016°W

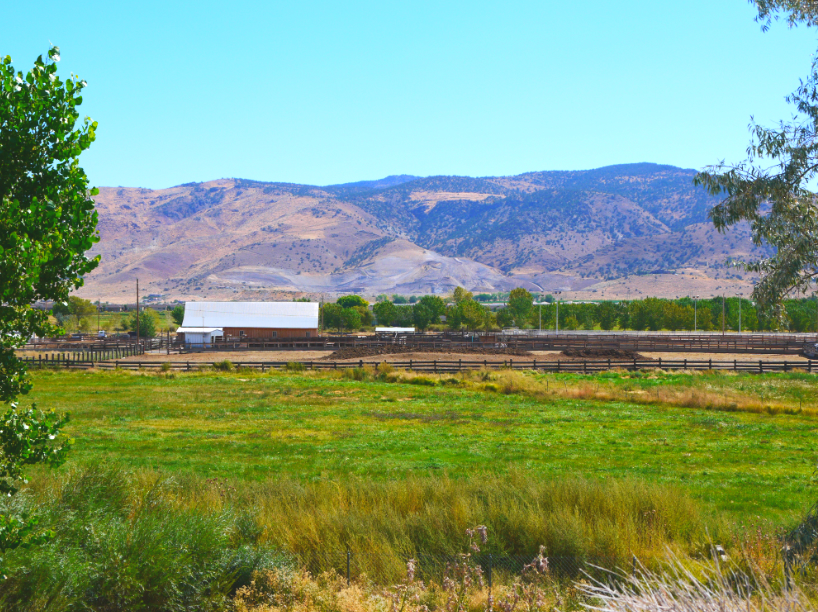
Damonte Ranch, looking toward Truckee Meadows

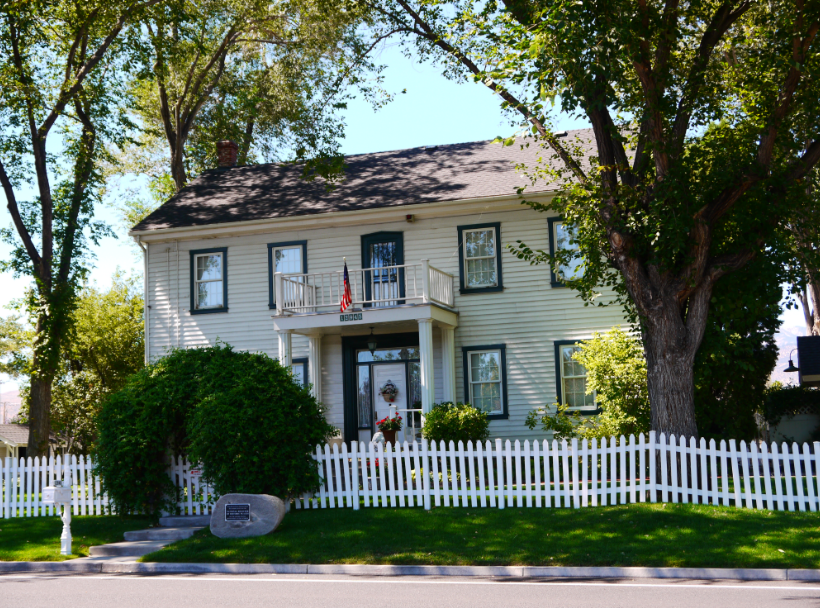
The original Damonte House is adjacent to the ranch, and is listed on the National Register for Historic Places. Highway 395 was diverted around this home.

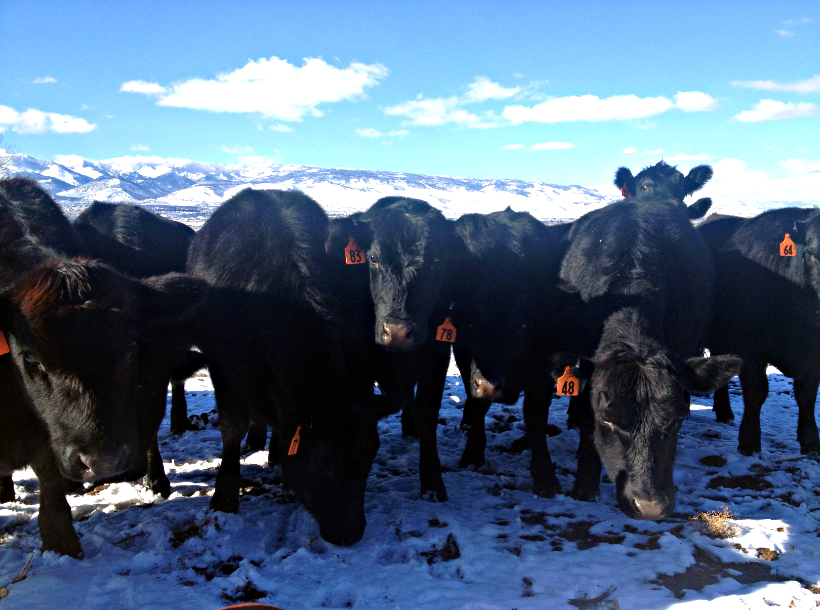
Black Angus cattle, with Sierra Nevada Mountains and Mount Rose in background, at Damonte Ranch and Truckee Meadows

The Damonte Ranch started in 1939 when Louis Damonte, an Italian immigrant farmed alfalfa and raised cattle. The original Damonte Ranch included about 620 acres (250 ha) known as the Peleg Brown Ranch, at 12945 Old Virginia Road in Reno, Nevada, back in 1864. Author Holly Walton-Buchanan, whose latest book, "Land of the Buckaroo: Historic Ranches of Western Nevada" includes a chapter in his book on the Brown-Damonte Ranch. Located in the Truckee Meadows and borders Interstate 580, U.S. Route 395 and the Eastern Range, the Damonte Ranch is both a working cattle ranch and a developed community.

== Development ==
Open spaces of the west brought development including business and industrial parks which were once the Damonte Ranch pasturelands. The Damonte Ranch is part of a master plan of 2,000 acres (810 ha) developed into a community of homes and industrial parks. The usable fertile land has been divided up and sold to developers. The century-old cattle and alfalfa ranch where some cattle still roam and alfalfa still grows has a build-out is set at 15 to 20 years under normal absorption rates.

The developers of the Damonte Ranch are involved in turning 10 million square feet ag land into of office, retail and industrial properties and over 100,000 single and multi-family homes. Damonte Ranch is a 1,962-acre (794 ha) master planned community meant for mixed use, with 350 acres (140 ha) of commercial use, 1,162 residential acres (470.24 ha), 173 acres (70 ha) of public facilities and 277 acres (112 ha) planned for open space and green belts. Located at the southern end of Reno, just before Mt. Rose Highway and south of Double Diamond Ranch, Damonte Ranch was originally formed by the consolidation of several smaller properties.

== History ==
Irrigation was important throughout the ranch's history for raising of wheat, oats, barley, corn and hay, and grazing cattle. Today's water system for Damonte Ranch is taken care of through a wholesale agreement between Washoe County and Sierra Pacific. Getting the wetlands delineations and permits from the Army Corps of Engineers.

One of the challenges in developing the projects was getting the US 395 interchange built, which resulted in the Damonte Ranch Parkway interchange. The Damonte Ranch High School opened in the fall of 2003 on a 62-acre (25 ha) site donated to the school district by the Damonte Family.

The Damonte Ranch is also a place where numerous birds reside and migrate through. Northern Nevada is a migratory path of harlequin duck, cackling goose, red-necked grebe, and medium-sized diurnal birds of prey, white-tailed kite, broad-winged hawk.
