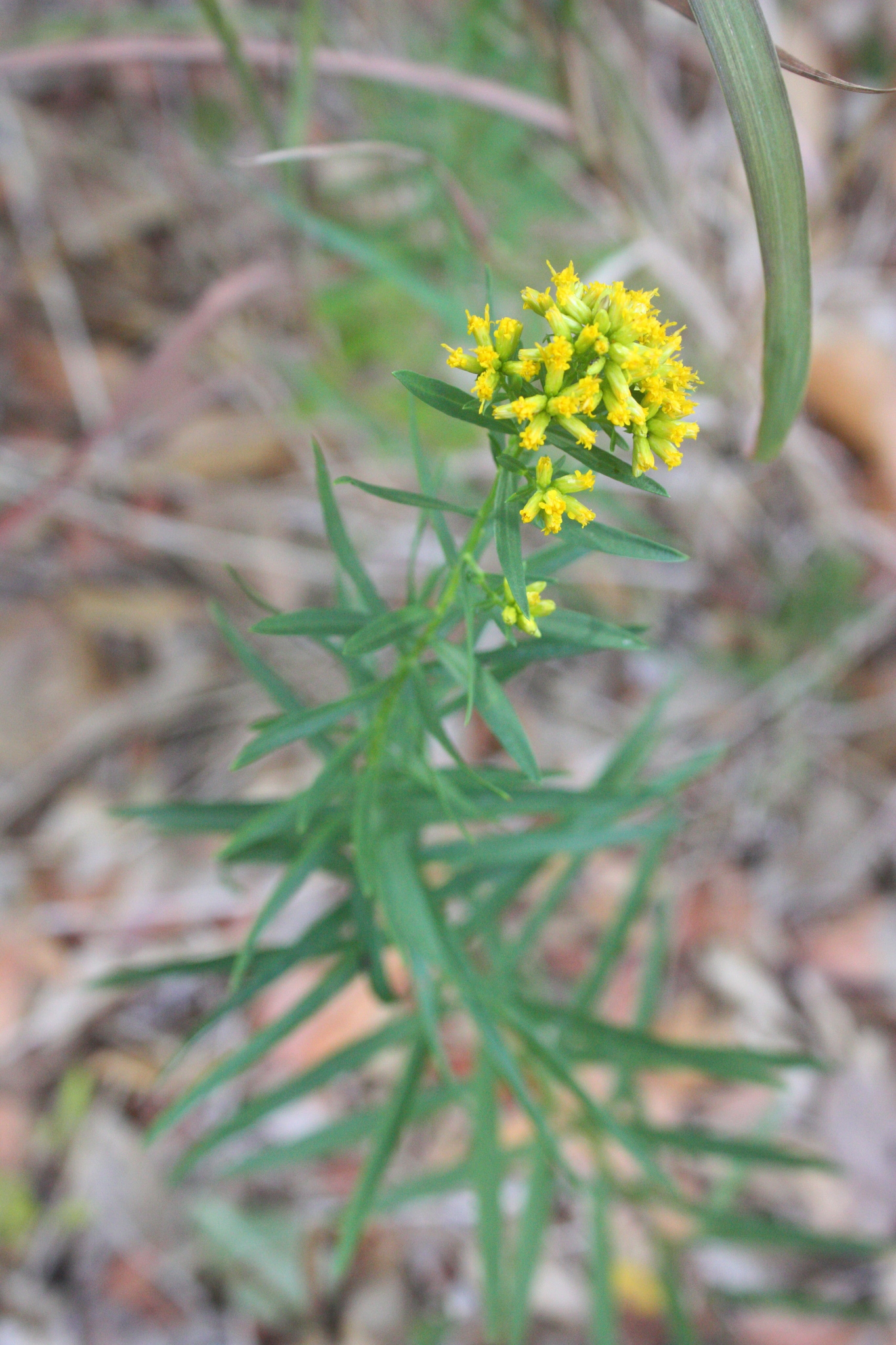

Scientific classification
- Kingdom: Plantae
- Clade: Tracheophytes
- Clade: Angiosperms
- Clade: Eudicots
- Clade: Asterids
- Order: Asterales
- Family: Asteraceae
- Genus: Euthamia
- Species: E. leptocephala

Binomial name
- Euthamia leptocephala (Torr. & A.Gray) Greene ex Porter & Britton

Synonyms
- Aster leptocephalus (Torr. & A.Gray) Kuntze; Solidago leptocephala Torr. & A.Gray; Euthamia chrysothamnoides Greene

= Euthamia leptocephala =

Species of flowering plant

Euthamia leptocephala, (commonly known as the narrowhead goldentop, Mississippi Valley goldentop, or bushy goldentop) is a North American species of plants in the family Asteraceae. It is native to the south-central United States, in the lower Mississippi Valley and the Coastal Plain of the Gulf of Mexico, from Texas to west-central Georgia and north as far as southern Illinois.

== Description ==
Euthamia leptocephala is a perennial herb or subshrub up to 100 cm (40 inches) tall. Leaves are alternate, simple, long and narrow, up to 8 cm (3.2 inches) long. One plant can produce many small, yellow flower heads flat-topped arrays. Each head has 7-14 ray florets surrounding 3-6 disc florets.

=== Galls ===
This species is host to the following insect induced galls:

- Asteromyia euthamiae Gagné, 1968 forms black spots on leaf blades
- Epiblema desertana (Zeller, 1875) causes stem swelling.

external link to gallformers
