= Truckee Meadows =

Valley in Nevada, US

Geography
- Country: United States
- State: Nevada
- Coordinates: 39.45°N 119.75°W
- Interactive map of Truckee Meadows

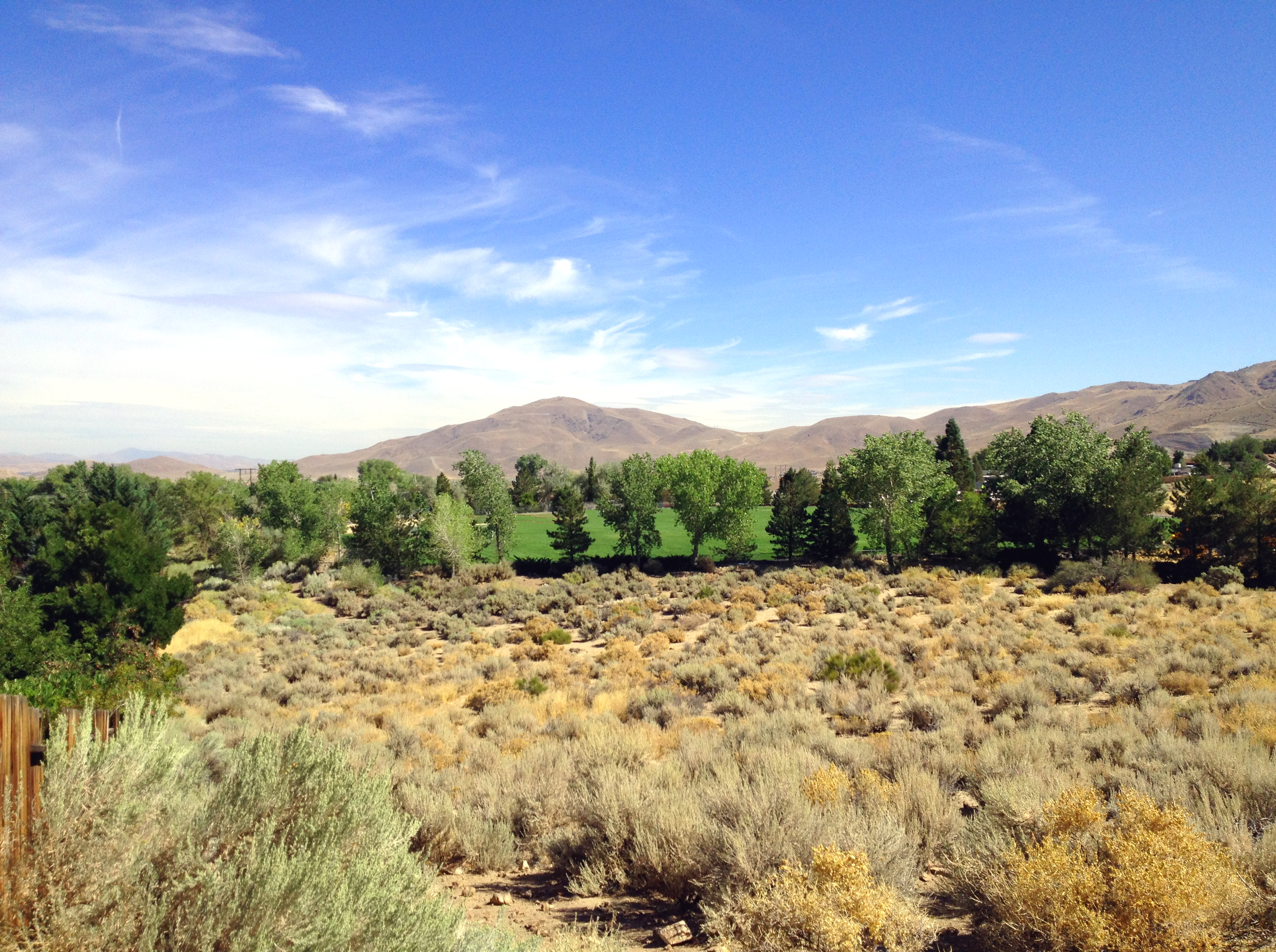
The Truckee Meadows as seen from the base of the Virginia Highlands

The Truckee Meadows is a valley in northern Nevada, named for the Truckee River, which collects and drains all water in the valley. Truckee Meadows is also colloquially used as a name for the Reno–Sparks metropolitan area, even though the metro area includes areas outside this valley. The name for the valley in the Washo language is Welganuk.

== Location ==
Per the United States Geological Survey (USGS), the Truckee Meadows is one of a series a north-south trending basins bounded by the Sierra Nevada on the western edge of the Great Basin. The Truckee Meadows covers approximately 94 square miles (240 km^{2}) in western Nevada. It is bounded on the west by the Carson Range, on the east by the Virginia Range and Pine Nut Mountains, on the south by the Steamboat Hills, and by Peavine Peak to the north. Steamboat Creek is the main tributary supplying the Truckee River through the Truckee Meadows. Steamboat Creek, flows northward into Steamboat Valley. Steamboat Valley is considered part of the Truckee Meadows. The Spanish Springs Valley drains into the Truckee Meadows area from the north.

== Colloquial usage ==
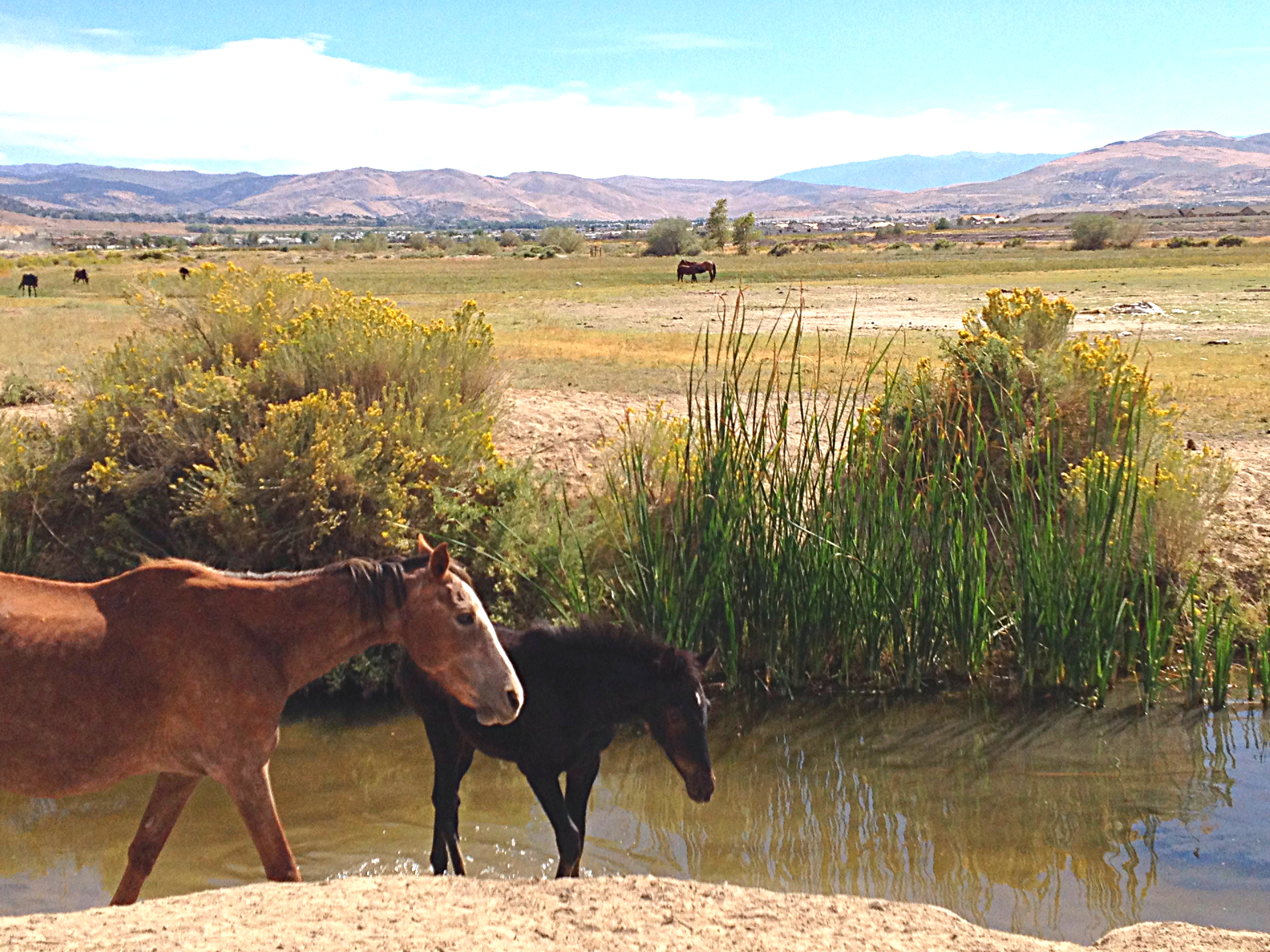
Mustangs in the Truckee Meadows. Picture was taken just prior to this portion of the valley being developed with homes.

Truckee Meadows has been used interchangeably with the Reno metropolitan area. However, the metro area's official definition includes all of Washoe County and Storey County. Several Reno suburbs are located in separate valleys, including Lemmon Valley, Golden Valley, Sun Valley, Nevada, Cold Springs valley, and Washoe Valley.

== Flora ==
Along Steamboat Creek of the Truckee Meadow, the most common plants include lush grasses like the Great Basin wild rye (Leymus cinereus) and tule (Scirpus sp.). Riparian vegetation of the meadow include black cottonwood (Populus trichocarpa), willow species (Salis sp.), and silver buffaloberry (Shepherdia argentea). At elevated and better-drained valley margins grows the typical sagebrush-grass zone. Common plants in this habitat consisted of big sagebrush (Artemisia tridentate), rabbitbrush (chrysothamnus sp.), greasewood (Sarcobatus vermiculatus), horsebrush (Tetradymia glabrata), and spiny hopsage (Grayia spinosa) Common bunch grasses included wheatgrass (Agropyron spicatum), bluegrass (Poa sp.), Great Basin Wild rye (Elymus cinereaus), Indian ricegrass (Achnatherum hymenoides), squirreltail (Sitanion hystrix), and needle and thread (Stipa comate).

== History ==
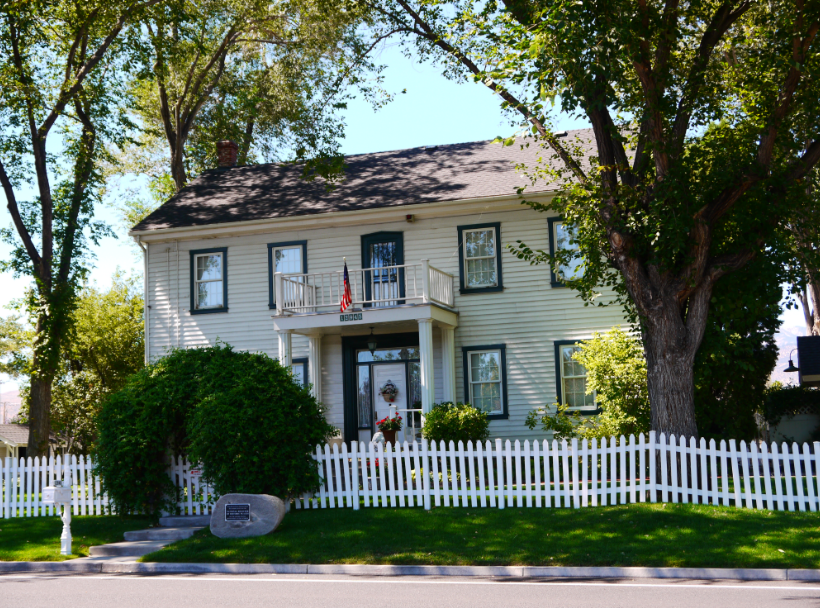
The house at Damonte Ranch is listed on the National Register of Historic Places

In 1857, pioneer rancher Peleg Brown, a Rhode Island native arrived in the Truckee Meadows with his brother, Joshua. The two brothers introduced alfalfa to the area and built their home (Damonte Ranch House) in 1864; the home still stands today. The house is listed on the National Register of Historic Places, which caused the Nevada Department of Transportation to divert the construction of Interstate 580 and U.S. Route 395 freeway around the property to preserve the home and ranch.

== Geology ==
The Truckee Meadows is a valley in western Nevada located within the western Great Basin. Named for the Truckee River, which flows through the valley from west to east, this area contains archaeological evidence of aboriginal human occupation.

The Truckee Formation, is the oldest deposit of the valley and yields very little water to wells. Most of the discharge of water is by evapotranspiration and by seepage to ditches and streams. Some water in the area is unsuitable for many uses because of its poor chemical quality. Water in the Steamboat Springs area is hot and has high concentrations of chloride and dissolved solids. Both water draining areas of bleached rock and ground water from areas of leached rock have high concentrations of sulfate and dissolved solids.
