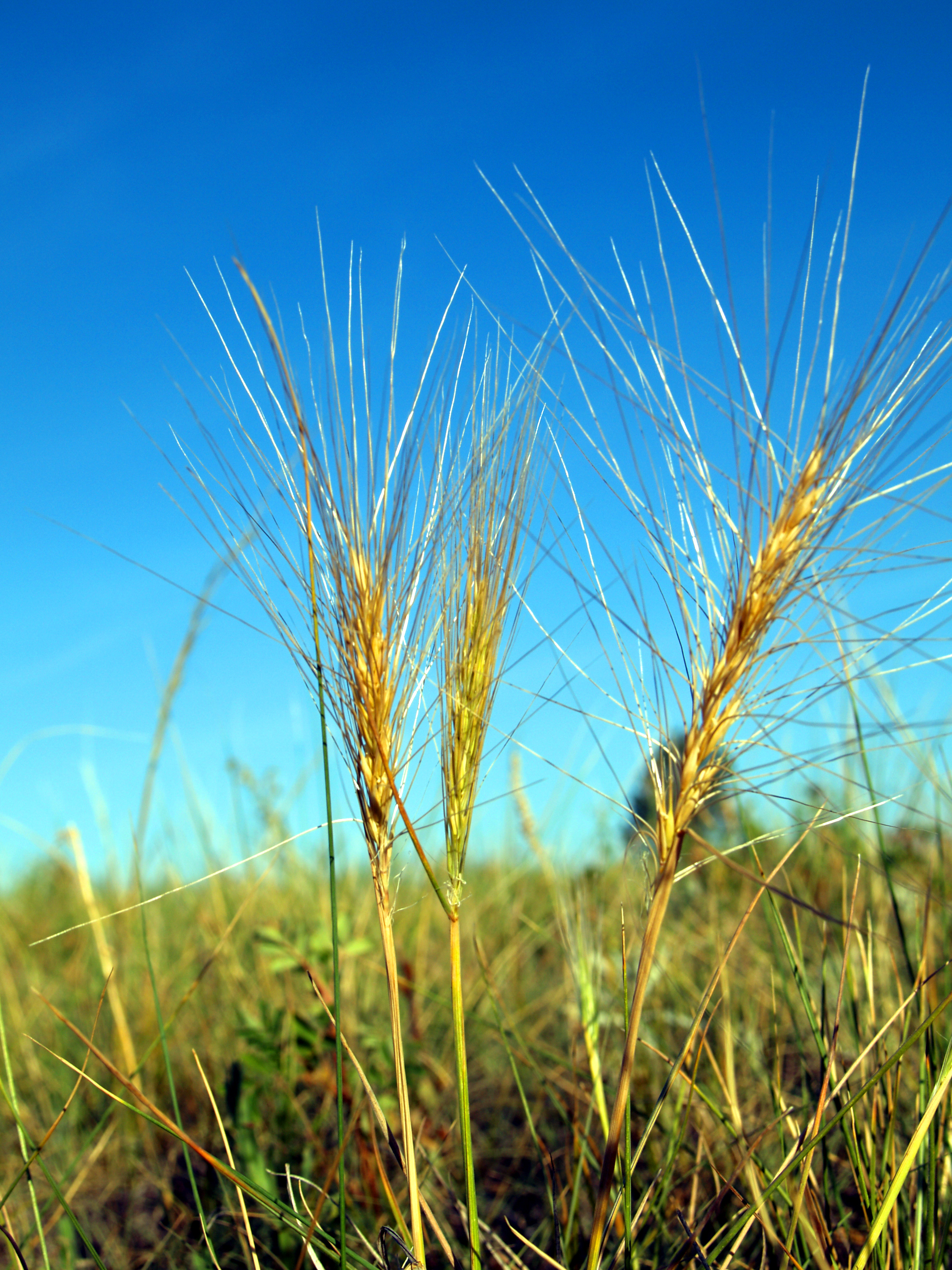

Conservation status
- Secure (NatureServe)

Scientific classification
- Kingdom: Plantae
- Clade: Tracheophytes
- Clade: Angiosperms
- Clade: Monocots
- Clade: Commelinids
- Order: Poales
- Family: Poaceae
- Subfamily: Pooideae
- Genus: Elymus
- Species: E. elymoides

Binomial name
- Elymus elymoides (Raf.) Swezey

Synonyms
- Sitanion hystrix

= Elymus elymoides =

Species of flowering plant

Elymus elymoides is a species of wild rye known by the common name squirreltail. This grass is native to central and western North America.

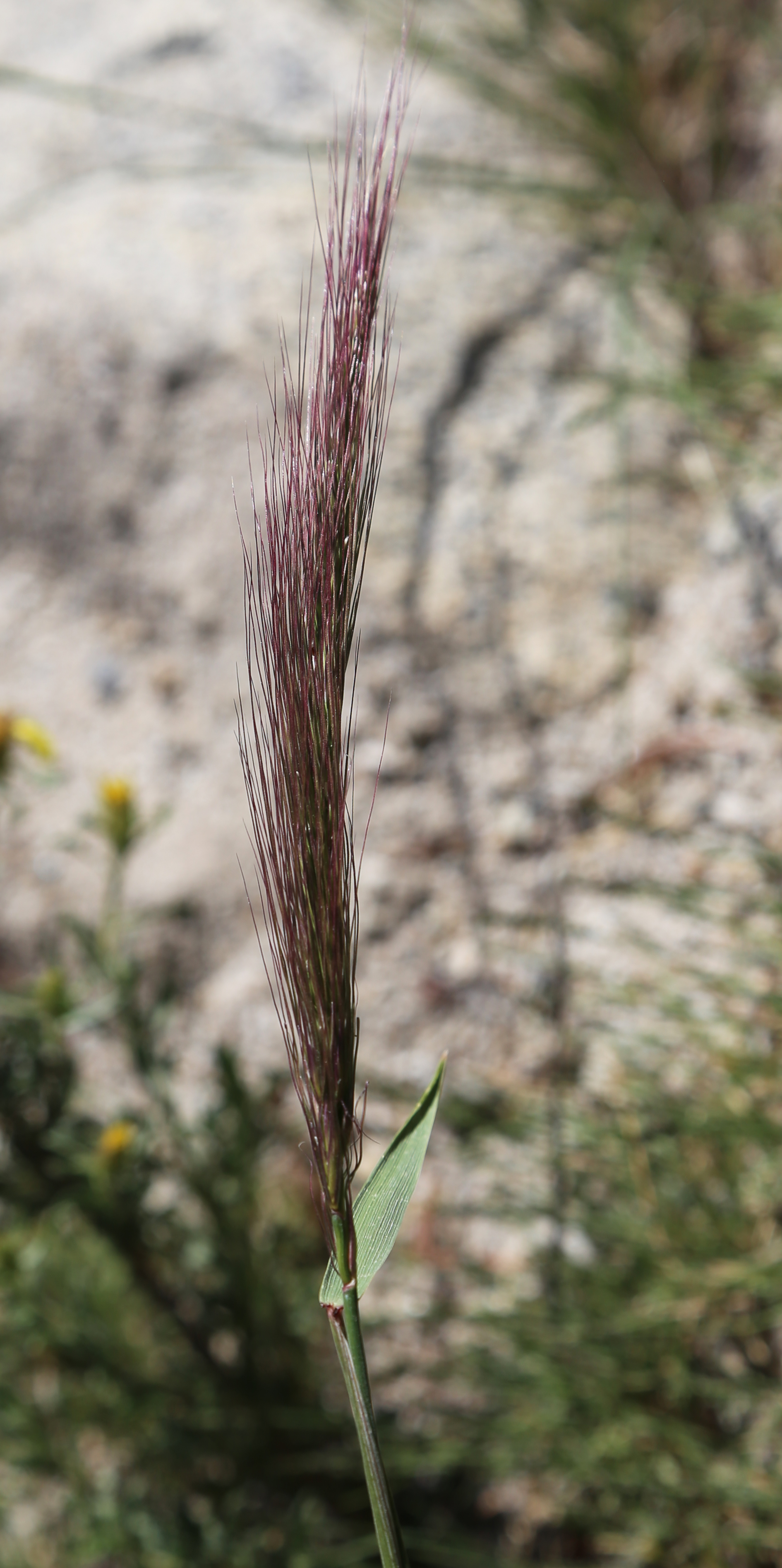
Elymus elymoides early-season spike close

== Description ==
Elymus elymoides is a perennial bunch grass growing to around 0.5 metres (1 1/2 feet) in height. Its erect solid stems have flat or rolled leaf blades. The inflorescence is up to 15 centimetres (6 inches) long and somewhat stiff and erect, with spikelets 1 or 2 cm long not counting the awn, which may be 9 cm (3 1/2 in) long and sticks straight out at maturity, making the inflorescence look like a bottlebrush, and aiding wind dispersal of the seeds. In contrast, the early season spike is compact and reddish.

== Subspecies ==
Subspecies include:

- E. e. ssp. brevifolius - widespread
- E. e. ssp. californicus - occurs in the western half of the species range
- E. e. ssp. elymoides - widespread
- E. e. ssp. hordeoides - limited mostly to the Pacific Northwest

== Distribution and habitat ==
The species is native to most of North America west of the Mississippi River and occurs in a number of ecosystems, from the alpine zone to desert sage scrub to valley grassland.

== Ecology ==
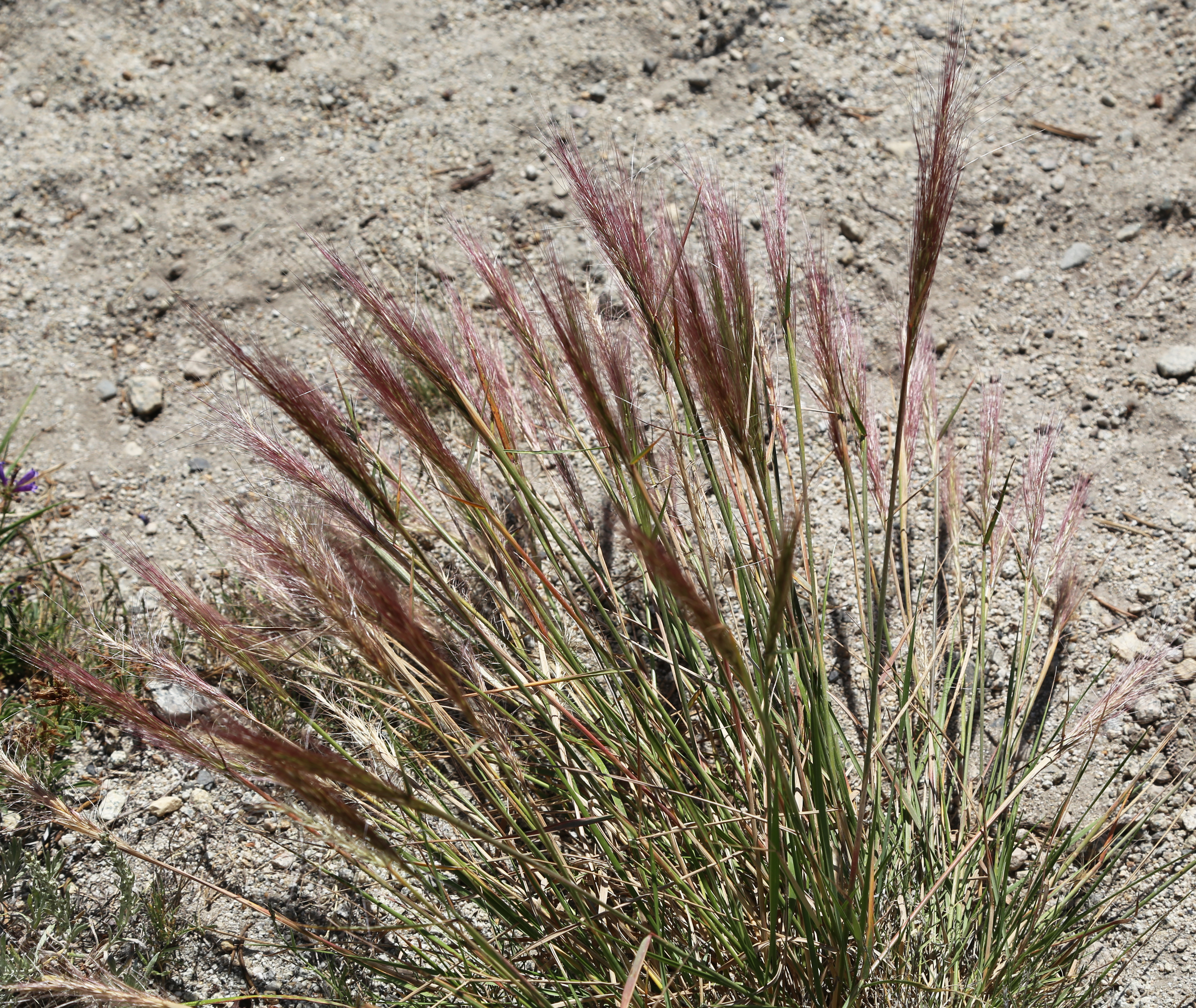
Young E. elymoides clump

This grass is considered very good forage for sheep. It is best for grazing during the winter, when it is small and green. It becomes less palatable to livestock when its awns grow long and sharp at maturity.

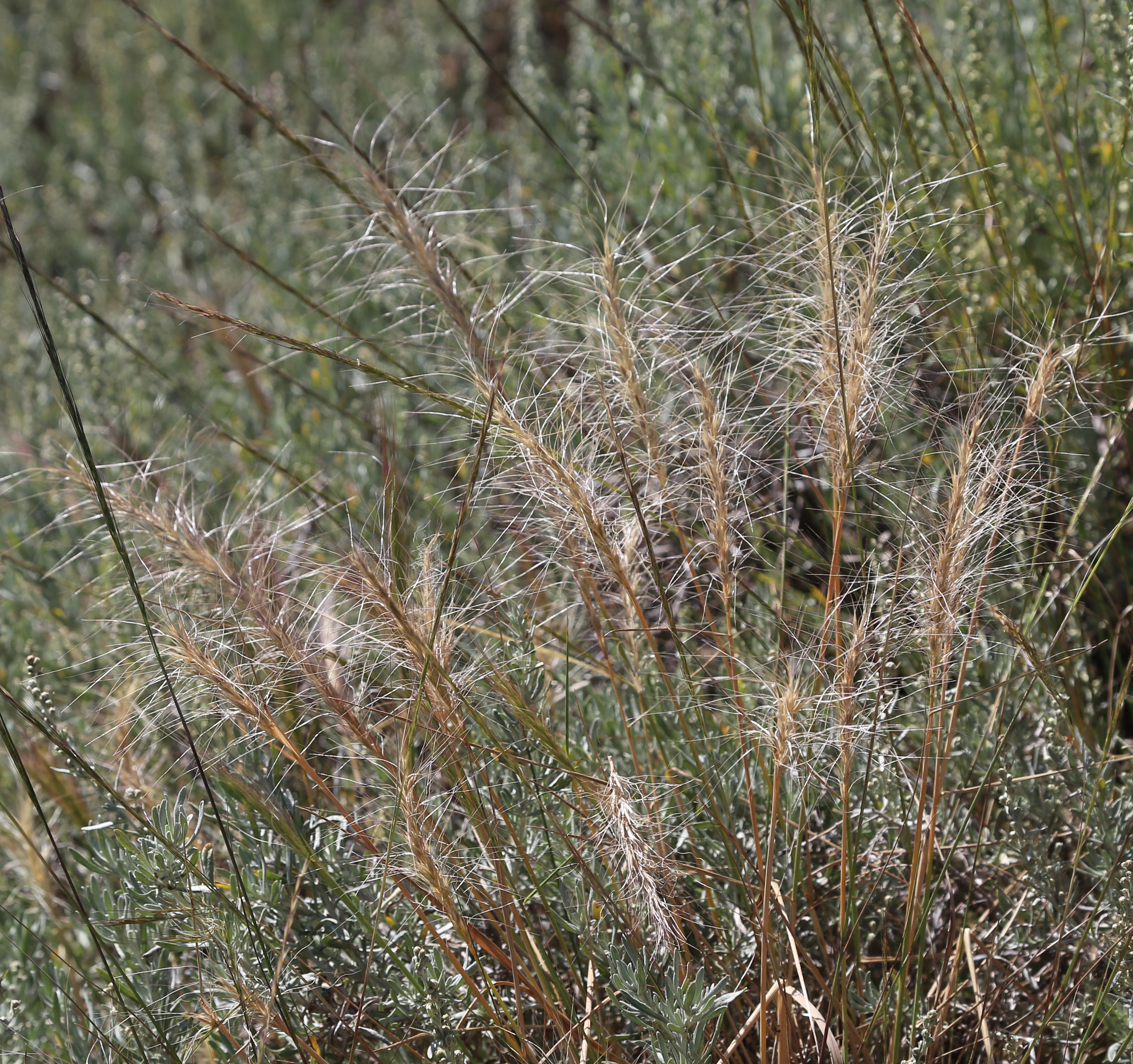
Aged E. elymoides clump

Evolving 55 million years ago, members of Poaceae produce wheat, rice, and barley cereal grains. Elymus elymoides is a specific type of wild rye that experiences competitive forces when introduced to invasive species, such as cheat grass (Bromus tectorum). E. elymoides experiences a decrease in fitness when growing concurrently with B. tectorum, leading to natural selection acting negatively on E. elymoides. This is perhaps best seen in the Great Basin, as the dry environment makes water a limiting resource, resulting in competition over it. B. tectorum's advantages may be due to its ability to re-engineer that particular ecosystem's scarce water supply. B. tectorum affects E. multisetus similarly, indicating that the trait causing decreased fitness is shared among the entire genus Elymus.

Competition also occurs between E. elymoides and the invasive crested wheatgrass (Agropyron cristatum). When introduced, crested wheatgrass negatively affects mature E. elymoides, despite being able to effectively compete at the seedling stage.

== Uses ==
The genus Elymus is a part of the Poaceae, the grass family, which is the most economically important plant family to modern human civilization.

If crested wheatgrass is used in rehabilitation or restoration of a site, then co-planting a native bunch grass, such as E. elymoides, may be helpful in preventing a crested wheatgrass monoculture. Because E. elymoides populations decline when introduced to certain populations, squirreltail may benefit more from a monoculture setting. This characteristic is supported by another species, Elymus nutas. However, although it is successful as a monoculture food source, it results in a reduction of carbon transfer and decreased soil health when grown alone. To preserve a prosperous Elymus elymoides food source, one must take into consideration its effects on the soil when grown alone, and its responses to competitive forces if grown with other plants.
