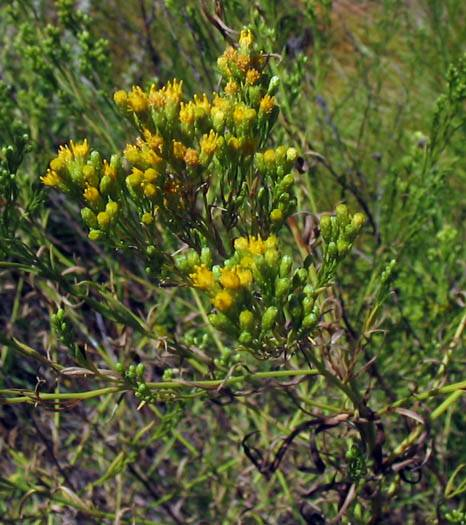

Conservation status
- Secure (NatureServe)

Scientific classification
- Kingdom: Plantae
- Clade: Tracheophytes
- Clade: Angiosperms
- Clade: Eudicots
- Clade: Asterids
- Order: Asterales
- Family: Asteraceae
- Genus: Euthamia
- Species: E. occidentalis

Binomial name
- Euthamia occidentalis Nutt.

Synonyms
- Euthamia occidentale Nutt.; Aster baccharoides Kuntze 1891 not (Benth.) Steetz 1856; Euthamia californica Gand.; Euthamia linarifolia Gand.; Solidago occidentalis (Nutt.) Torr. & A.Gray

= Euthamia occidentalis =

Species of flowering plant

Euthamia occidentalis is a flowering plant, known by the common names western flat topped goldenrod, western goldentop and western goldenrod, in the family Asteraceae.

== Description ==
Euthamia occidentalis is a scrubby perennial plant with many green stems which age into a dull brownish-green, and green small leaves. It has plentiful yellowish clusters of flowers. Flowers bloom July to November.

== Distribution and habitat ==
It is a common plant of western North America, from British Columbia and Alberta, the Western United States (from the Pacific as far east as Montana, Nebraska, New Mexico), and Baja California. It is most likely to be found near water, such as wetlands, ditches, and marshes.
