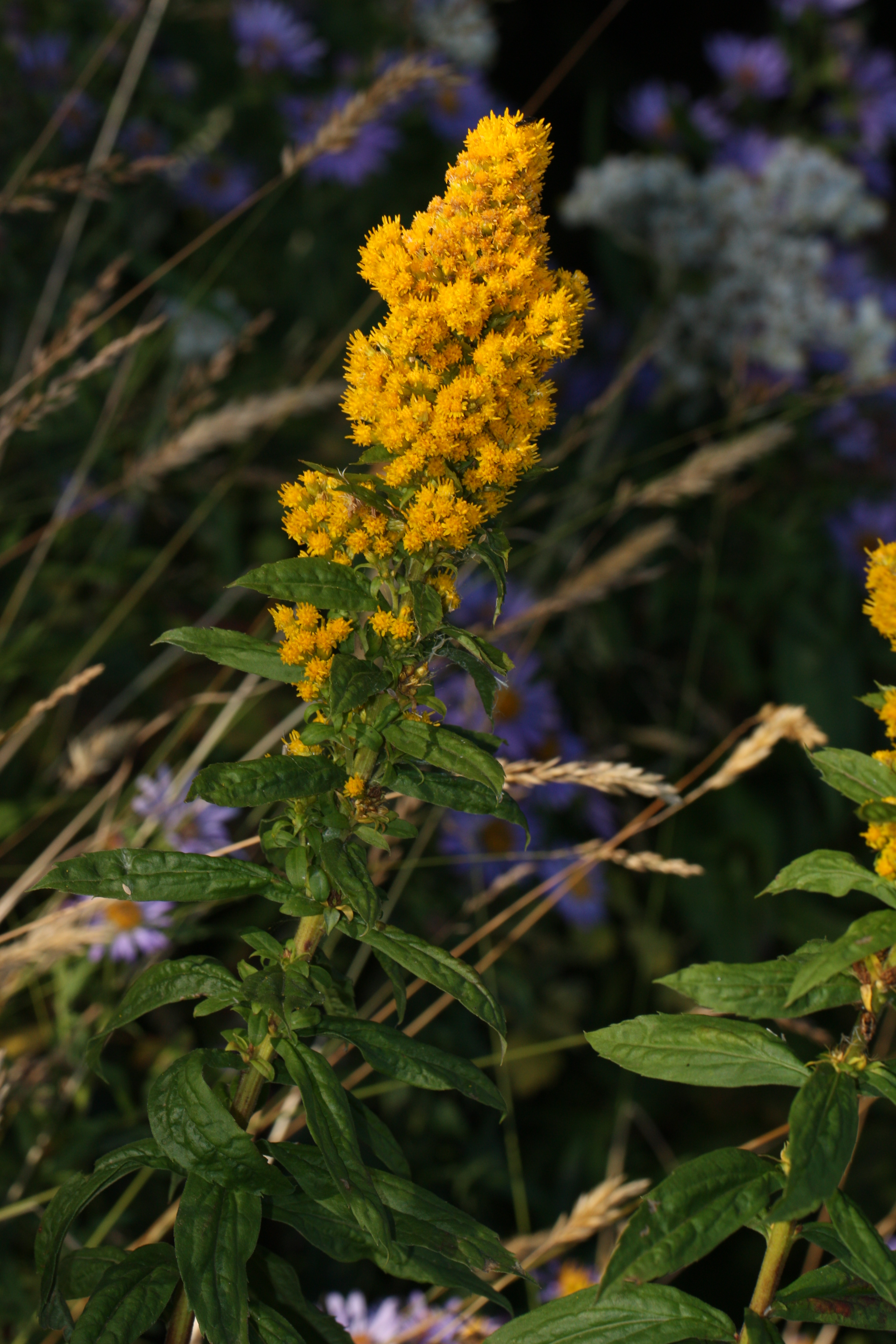

Conservation status
- Secure (NatureServe)

Scientific classification
- Kingdom: Plantae
- Clade: Tracheophytes
- Clade: Angiosperms
- Clade: Eudicots
- Clade: Asterids
- Order: Asterales
- Family: Asteraceae
- Genus: Solidago
- Species: S. lepida

Binomial name
- Solidago lepida DC.

Synonyms
- Synonymy: Aster lepidus (DC.) Kuntze; Solidago canadensis var. lepida (DC.) Cronquist; Solidago lepida var. caurina (Piper) M.Peck; Solidago lepida var. elongata (Nutt.) Fernald; Solidago lepida var. fallax Fernald; Solidago lepida subsp. fallax (Fernald) Semple; Solidago lepida var. molina Fernald; Solidago lepida var. salebrosa (Piper) Semple; Solidago lepida var. subserrata DC.

= Solidago lepida =

Species of flowering plant

Solidago lepida, the western Canada goldenrod or western goldenrod, is a North American plant species in the genus Solidago of the family Asteraceae. It is widespread across much of Canada, the western United States, and northern Mexico.

Description

Solidago lepida is a perennial herb up to 150 cm (5 feet) tall, spreading by means of underground rhizomes. Leaves have coarse teeth and are on the stem rather than at the base. One plant can sometimes produce as many as 800 small flower heads, each with 7-22 ray florets surrounding 2-13 disc florets.

Varieties

- Solidago lepida subsp. fallax (Fernald) Semple - Labrador, Newfoundland, Québec, New Brunswick
- Solidago lepida var. lepida - from Alaska east to the Northwest Territories and south to California, Arizona, New Mexico, Chihuahua
- Solidago lepida var. salebrosa (Piper) Semple - Rocky Mountains from Alberta + British Columbia south to New Mexico, Arizona and Baja California
