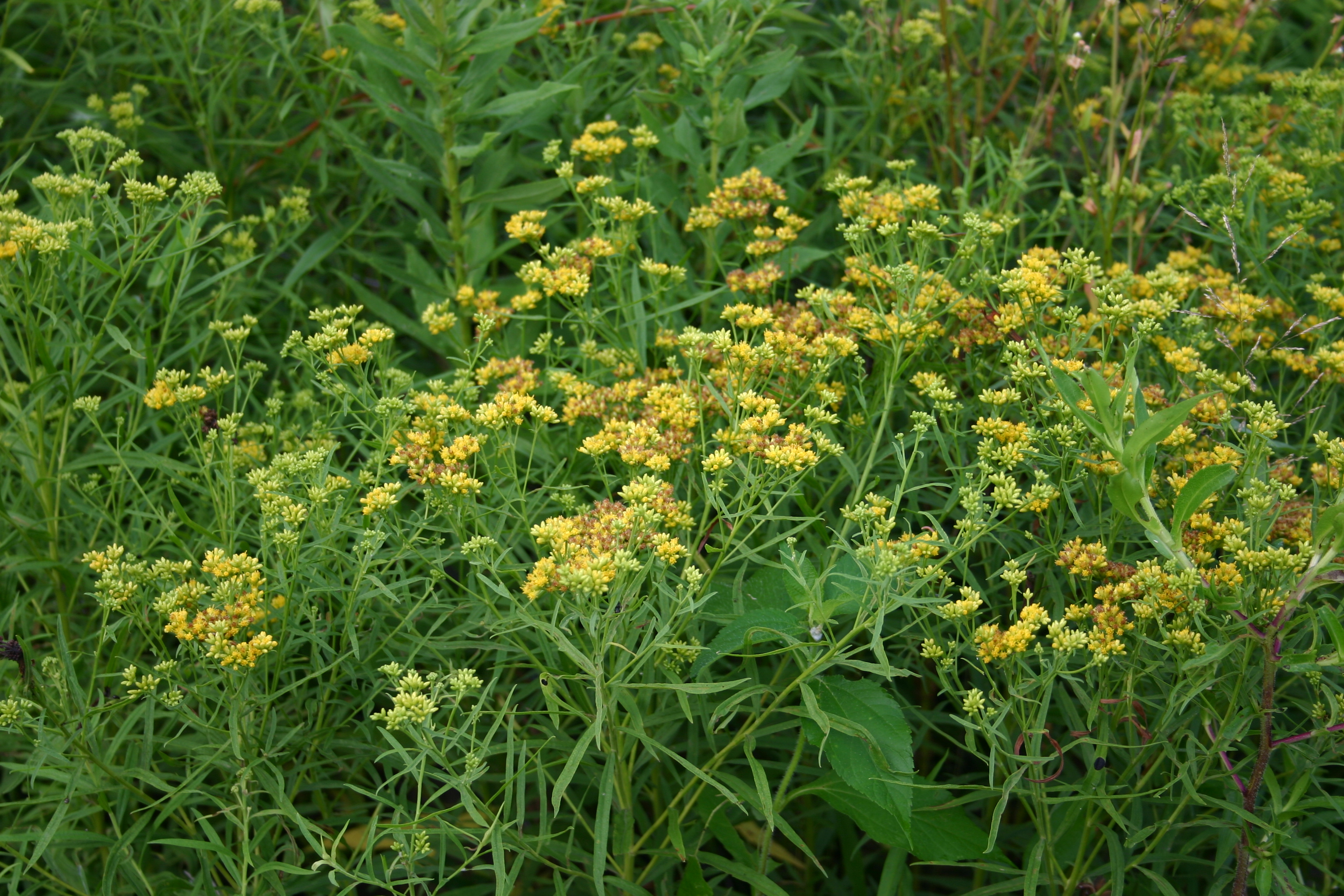
- Flowering plant

Conservation status
- Secure (NatureServe)

Scientific classification
- Kingdom: Plantae
- Clade: Tracheophytes
- Clade: Angiosperms
- Clade: Eudicots
- Clade: Asterids
- Order: Asterales
- Family: Asteraceae
- Genus: Euthamia
- Species: E. graminifolia

Binomial name
- Euthamia graminifolia (L.) Nutt.

Synonyms
- Synonymy: Aster euthamia Kuntze; Aster graminifolius (L.) Kuntze; Chrysocoma graminifolia L.; Chrysocoma virginiana Hort. ex DC.; Diplemium carolinianum Raf.; Erigeron carolinensis Crantz; Erigeron carolinianus L.; Euthamia caroliniana (L.) Greene ex Porter & Britton; Euthamia fastigiata Bush; Euthamia floribunda Greene; Euthamia tenuifolia (Pursh) Nutt.; Euthamia galetorum Greene; Euthamia hirtella Greene; Euthamia hirtipes (Fernald) Sieren; Euthamia media Greene; Euthamia microcephala (Nutt.) Greene; Euthamia microphylla Greene; Euthamia minor (Michx.) Greene; Euthamia nuttallii Greene; Euthamia remota Greene; Solidago caroliniana (L.) Britton, Sterns & Poggenb.; Solidago galetorum (Greene) Friesner; Solidago graminifolia (L.) Salisb.; Solidago lanceolata L.; Solidago microcephala (Greene) Bush; Solidago microphylla (Greene) Bush 1918 not Engelm. ex Small 1903; Solidago minor (Michx.) Fernald; Solidago moseleyi Fernald; Solidago tenuifolia Pursh

= Euthamia graminifolia =

Species of flowering plant

Euthamia graminifolia, the grass-leaved goldenrod or flat-top goldenrod, is a North American species of plants in the family Asteraceae.

It is native to much of Canada (from Newfoundland to British Columbia), and the northern and eastern United States (primarily the Northeast, the Great Lakes region, and the Ohio Valley, with additional populations in the Southeast, the Great Plains, and a few scattered locations in the Pacific Northwest). There are also introduced populations in Europe and Asia.

== Description ==
Euthamia graminifolia is a herbaceous plant on thin, branching stems. Leaves are alternate, simple, long and narrow much like grass leaves (hence the name of the species). One plant can produce many small, yellow flower heads flat-topped arrays sometimes as much as 30 cm (1 foot) across. Each head has 7–35 ray florets surrounding 3–13 disc florets. The species is very common in fallow fields, waste places, fencerows, and vacant lots in many places.

=== Galls ===
This species is host to the following insect induced galls:

- Asphondylia pseudorosa (bud, leaf snap and capitulum))
- Asteromyia euthamiae Gagné, 1968
- Coleosporium asterum (Dietel)
- Dasineura carbonaria (Felt, 1907)
- Epiblema desertana (Zeller, 1875)
- Lasioptera cylindrigallae Felt, 1907
- Rhopalomyia fusiformae Felt, 1907
- Rhopalomyia lobata Felt, 1908
- Rhopalomyia pedicellata Felt, 1908
