= John Maurice Tucker =

American botanist (1916-2008)

John Maurice Tucker (January 7, 1916, Yamhill County, Oregon – July 5, 2008) was an American botanist, herbarium director, and leading expert on oak taxonomy.

At the University of California, Berkeley (UC Berkeley), he graduated in botany in 1940 with a bachelor's degree and in 1950 with a Ph.D. As a graduate student he was the botanist on the University of California's El Salvador Expedition, which lasted from December 1941 to May 1942. His Ph.D dissertation, entitled "Interrelationships within the Quercus dumosa complex", was written under the guidance of Herbert L. Mason, Ledyard Stebbins, and Adriance Foster. The dissertation "dealt with the evolution and relationships of scrub oak (Quercus dumosa) and related species, including hybridization between scrub oak and grey oak (Quercus turbinella), and the parentage of Alvord’s oak (Quercus × alvordiana).

In 1947, while still a graduate student at UC Berkeley, he was hired as the director of the herbarium of the botany department of the University of California, Davis (UC Davis). From 1947 until his retirement in 1986, he was the director of the botany department's herbarium and a faculty member in the botany department. He taught the UC Davis course on plant taxonomy, as well as courses on general botany and poisonous plants. He also served as the director of the UC Davis Arboretum for 12 years.

In 1947, when Tucker became the director, the UC Davis herbarium consisted of 9,400 specimens. He initiated an active exchange program which, by the time he retired, increased the UC Davis Botany Department Herbarium's holdings to about 150,000 specimens.

He was a Guggenheim Fellow for the academic year 1955–1956, which he spent on sabbatical leave studying variation in hybrid oak populations in the region of the southern Rocky Mountains.

In 1962, he established an oak grove near the western end of the Arboretum, planting acorns that he had collected from around the world. Today the Arboretum is home to 574 oak trees, including a number of native California oak species, and is recognized as a national resource.

In 1963 he was elected a Fellow of the American Association for the Advancement of Science.

Dr. Tucker contributed taxonomic treatments of Quercus to several publications, including the current flora for California, The Jepson Manual, and he published widely on hybridization in oaks. Upon his retirement in 1986, the Botany Department Herbarium was renamed the J.M. Tucker Herbarium. He continued to study oaks in retirement and completed the treatment of the genus for the 2012 edition of The Jepson Manual, shortly before his death in July 2008.

In 2001 Tucker made a philanthropic gift of $500,000 to the herbarium and arboretum at UC Davis. He was a mentor and advisor for not only botany students, but also some entomology students.

In 1942 in California, he married Katrine June Petersen (1918–1987). They had two sons and a daughter. Upon his death in 2008, John Maurice Tucker was survived by a daughter, a son, and a grandson. Another son, John Christopher "Chris" Tucker (born 1948), died in 2003.

== Eponyms ==
- Quercus john-tuckeri Nixon & C.H.Mull.

== Selected publications ==
- Tucker, John M. (1952). "Taxonomic Interrelationships in the Quercus Dumosa Complex". Madroño. 11 (6): 234–251. JSTOR 41422741.
- Tucker, John M. (1952). "Evolution of the Californian Oakquercus Alvordiana". Evolution. 6 (2): 162–180. doi:10.1111/j.1558-5646.1952.tb01412.x. S2CID 87469940.
- Tucker, John M. (1953). "Two New Oak Hybrids from California". Madroño. 12 (4): 119–127. JSTOR 41423509.
- Tucker, John M.; Muller, Cornelius H. (1956). "The Geographic History of Quercus ajoensis". Evolution. 10 (2): 157–175. doi:10.1111/j.1558-5646.1956.tb02842.x. JSTOR 2405891. S2CID 87852824.
- Tucker, John M.; Sauer, Jonathan D. (1958). "Aberrant Amaranthus Populations of the Sacramento-San Joaquin Delta, California". Madroño. 14 (8): 252–261. JSTOR 41423581.
- Cottam, Walter P.; Tucker, John M.; Drobnick, Rudy (1959). "Some Clues to Great Basin Postpluvial Climates Provided by Oak Distributions". Ecology. 40 (3): 361–377. doi:10.2307/1929752. JSTOR 1929752.
- Tucker, John M.; Haskell, Horace S. (1960). "Quercus Dunnii and Q. Chrysolepis in Arizona". Brittonia. 12 (3): 196. doi:10.2307/2805053. JSTOR 2805053. S2CID 2795979.
- Tucker, John M. (1961). "Studies in the Quercus Undulata Complex I. A Preliminary Statement". American Journal of Botany. 48 (3): 202–208. doi:10.1002/j.1537-2197.1961.tb11626.x.
- Schmid, Rudolf; Mallory, Thomas E.; Tucker, John M. (1968). "Biosystematic Evidence for Hybridization Between Arctostaphylos Nissenana and A. Viscida". Brittonia. 20 (1): 34–43. doi:10.2307/2805459. JSTOR 2805459. S2CID 43190924.
- Tucker, J. M. (1972). "Hermaphroditic Flowers in Californian Oaks". Madroño. 21 (7): 482–486. JSTOR 41423832.
- Tucker, J. M. (1974). "Patterns of Parallel Evolution of Leaf Form in New World Oaks". Taxon. 23 (1): 129–154. doi:10.2307/1218095. JSTOR 1218095.
- Tucker, J. M.; Neilson, R. P.; Wullstein, L. H. (1980). "Hermaphroditic Flowering in Gambel Oak". American Journal of Botany. 67 (8): 1265–1267. doi:10.1002/j.1537-2197.1980.tb07759.x.
- "Taxonomy of California oaks by John M. Tucker". General Technical Report PSW‐44. 1980. pp. 19–29.
