= Chionodes messor =

Scientific classification
- Kingdom: Animalia
- Phylum: Arthropoda
- Clade: Pancrustacea
- Class: Insecta
- Order: Lepidoptera
- Family: Gelechiidae
- Genus: Chionodes
- Species: C. messor

Binomial name
- Chionodes messor Hodges, 1999

Species of moth

Chionodes messor is a moth in the family Gelechiidae. It is found in North America, where it has been recorded from Nevada and California.

The larvae are leaf tiers on Quercus chrysolepis, Quercus douglasii, Quercus dumosa, Quercus kelloggii, Quercus turbinella, Quercus vaccinifolia and Quercus wislizenii.
