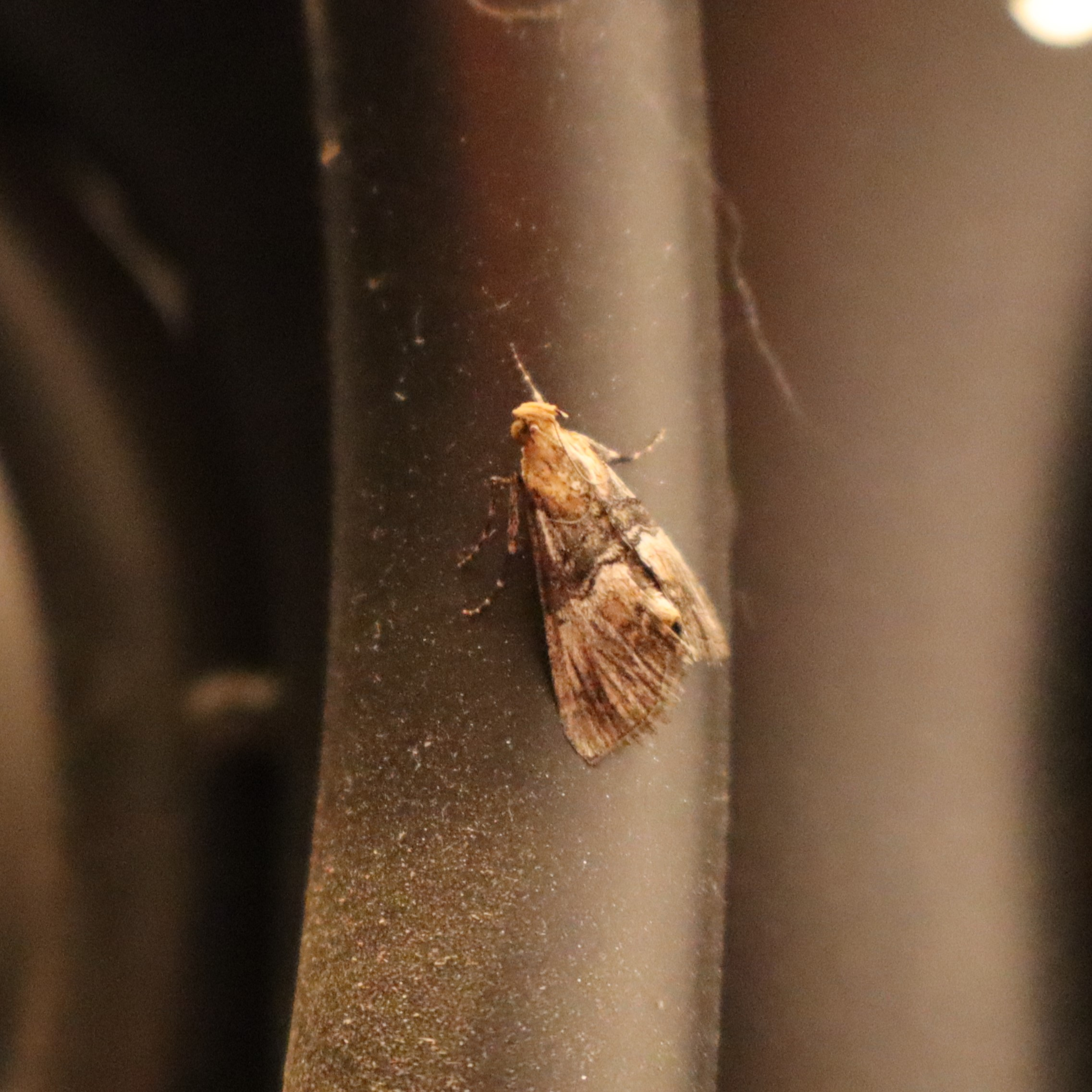

Scientific classification
- Kingdom: Animalia
- Phylum: Arthropoda
- Clade: Pancrustacea
- Class: Insecta
- Order: Lepidoptera
- Family: Pyralidae
- Genus: Acrobasis
- Species: A. comptella

Binomial name
- Acrobasis comptella Ragonot, 1887

Synonyms
- Rhodophaea kofa Opler, 1977; Rhodophaea fria Opler, 1977; Rhodophaea neva Opler, 1977

= Acrobasis comptella =

Species of moth

Acrobasis comptella is a species of snout moth in the genus Acrobasis. It was described by Émile Louis Ragonot in 1887, and is known from the western United States.

The larvae feed on Quercus dumosa, Quercus douglasii, Quercus garryana, Quercus ajoensis and Chrysolepis sempervirens.
