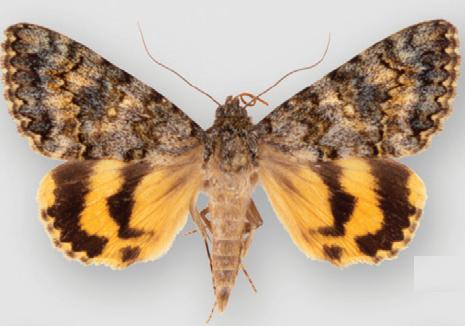

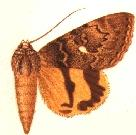

Scientific classification
- Kingdom: Animalia
- Phylum: Arthropoda
- Class: Insecta
- Order: Lepidoptera
- Superfamily: Noctuoidea
- Family: Erebidae
- Genus: Catocala
- Species: C. andromache

Binomial name
- Catocala andromache H. Edwards, 1885

Synonyms
- Ephesia andromache; Catocala wellsi Johnson, 1983

= Catocala andromache =

Andromache underwing

Species of moth

Catocala andromache, the Andromache underwing, is a moth of the family Erebidae. The species was first described by Henry Edwards in 1885. It is found in the United States from southern California to Arizona.

Subspecies Catocala andromache benjamini has been elevated to species level and is now known as Catocala benjamini.

The wingspan is 50 to 55 mm. Adults are on wing from June to July depending on the location. There is probably one generation per year.

The larvae feed on Quercus dumosa, Quercus turbinella and Quercus wislizeni.

== Subspecies ==
Catocala andromache wellsi, recorded from Central California, is now considered a synonym.
