= Scrub oak =

Scrub oak is a common name for several species of small, shrubby oaks. It may refer to:

- the Chaparral plant community in California, or to one of the following species.

== In California ==
- California scrub oak (Quercus berberidifolia), a widespread species commonly referred to as scrub oak
- Coastal scrub oak (Quercus dumosa), although currently defined in a narrow sense, has been applied to other scrub oaks now considered separate species

Other California species referred to as "scrub oaks"

- Leather oak (Quercus durata)
- Tucker oak (Quercus john-tuckeri)
- Island scrub oak (Quercus pacifica)

== In the Southwestern United States ==
- Coahuila scrub oak (Quercus intricata), in the US, it is reported at only two sites: One in the Chisos Mountains inside Big Bend National Park, and the other 15 miles SW of Van Horn.
- Gambel oak (Quercus gambelii) (Note: The hybrid of Q. gambelii and Q. turbinella is Quercus × pauciloba, synonym Quercus undulata."Quercus ×pauciloba Rydb. (pro sp.) [gambelii × turbinella]". United States Department of Agriculture. "General" and "Synonyms" tabs.)
- Gray oak (Quercus grisea), in the mountains of the southwestern United States and northern Mexico.
- Emory oak (Quercus emoryi)
- Pungent oak (Quercus pungens)
- Sonoran scrub oak (Quercus turbinella)

== In the Northeastern United States ==
- Bear oak (Quercus ilicifolia)
- Britton's Oak (Quercus ×brittonii), a hybrid of Bear oak (Quercus ilicifolia) and Blackjack oak (Quercus marilandica)
- Dwarf Chinkapin (Quercus prinoides), distribution extends to Midwest and South-Central U.S.

== In the Southeastern United States ==
- Chapman oak (Quercus chapmanii)
- Myrtle oak (Quercus myrtifolia)
- Sandhill oak (Quercus inopina)
- Sand live oak (Quercus geminata)
- Turkey oak (Quercus laevis)

See also Florida scrub

== Europe ==
- Kermes oak (Quercus coccifera)
- Gall oak (Quercus lusitanica)

== Others ==
- Santa Cruz Island oak (Quercus parvula)
