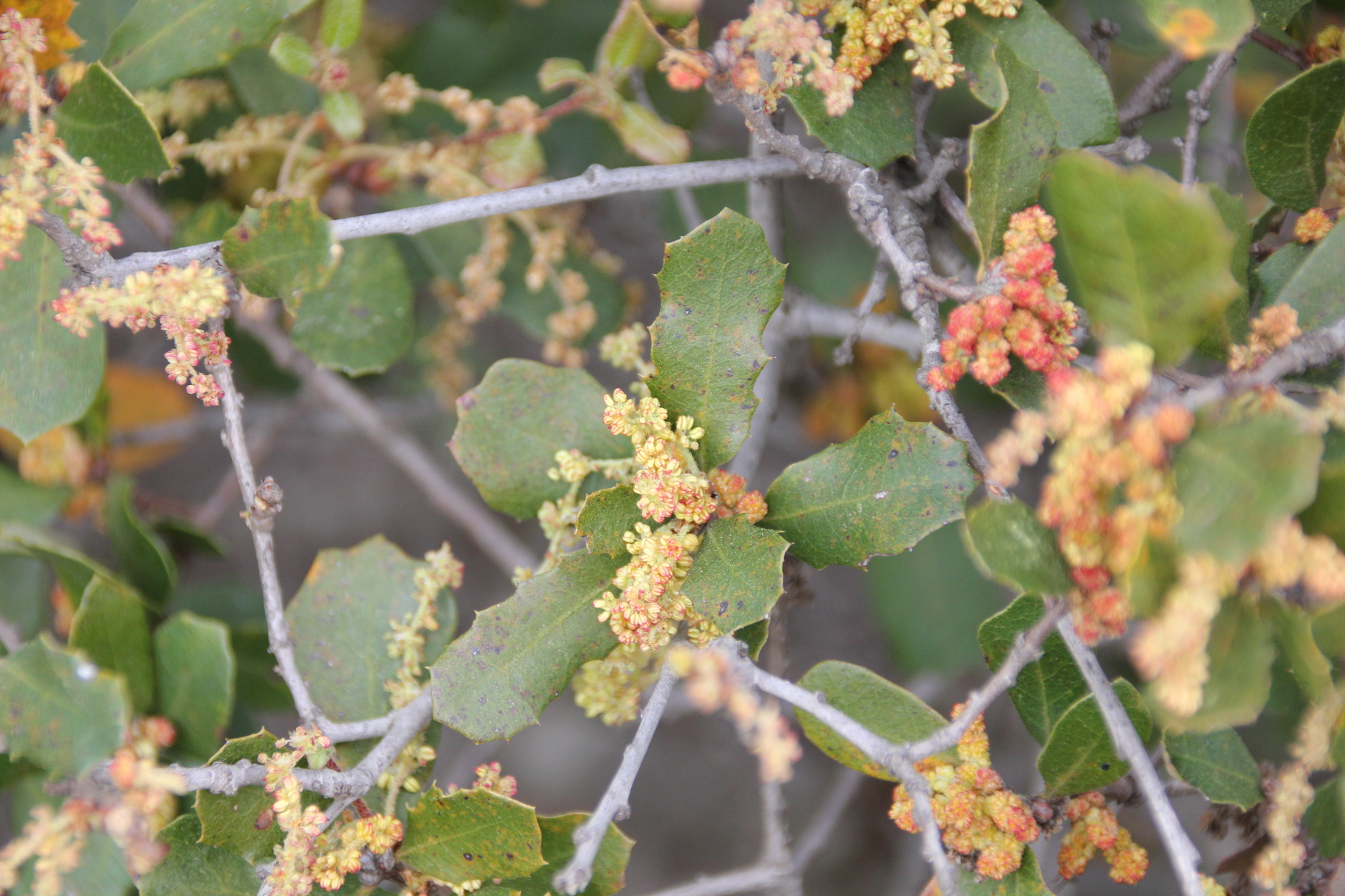
- Quercus × acutidens

Scientific classification
- Kingdom: Plantae
- Clade: Tracheophytes
- Clade: Angiosperms
- Clade: Eudicots
- Clade: Rosids
- Order: Fagales
- Family: Fagaceae
- Genus: Quercus
- Subgenus: Quercus subg. Quercus
- Section: Quercus sect. Quercus
- Species: Q. × acutidens

Binomial name
- Quercus × acutidens Torr.

Synonyms
- Quercus dumosa ×acutidens Torr.

= Quercus × acutidens =

Hybrid species of oak tree

Quercus × acutidens is a hybrid oak in the genus Quercus. It is reported from the area of coastal Southern California to Baja California as a naturally occurring hybrid between Quercus cornelius-mulleri and Quercus engelmannii.

It is a shrub or tree and grows primarily in the temperate biome. The hybrid formula is Q. cornelius-mulleri × Q. engelmannii.
