= Chionodes chrysopyla =

Scientific classification
- Kingdom: Animalia
- Phylum: Arthropoda
- Clade: Pancrustacea
- Class: Insecta
- Order: Lepidoptera
- Family: Gelechiidae
- Genus: Chionodes
- Species: C. chrysopyla

Binomial name
- Chionodes chrysopyla (Keifer, 1935)

Synonyms
- Gelechia chrysopyla Keifer, 1935

Species of moth

Chionodes chrysopyla is a moth in the family Gelechiidae. It is found in North America, where it has been recorded from California, Arizona, Washington and British Columbia.

The wingspan is 11–13 mm. The forewings are whitish and whitish ochreous, unevenly irrorated and overlaid blackish. There is a light area from the costa near the base pointing obliquely toward the plical stigma which is indistinctly blackish at one-third. There is a black oblique band from about the costal one-fourth, beyond the light area, to the first discal stigma which is moderately large and black. The second discal is black, large, irregular at two-thirds. Beyond this, the wing area is darker and there is a whitish narrow zig-zag fascia from the costa to the tornus and there are indications of lighter spots around the apical margins. The hindwings are light grey basally, darker apically.

The larvae feed on Quercus agrifolia, Quercus lobata, Quercus wislizenii and Quercus dumosa.
