= C. californiensis =

C. californiensis may refer to:

- Calcinus californiensis, a hermit crab species
- Catocala californiensis, a moth species found in southern California

== See also ==
- List of Latin and Greek words commonly used in systematic names#C
