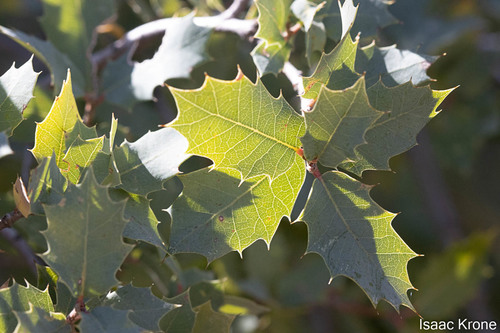

Conservation status
- Vulnerable (IUCN 3.1)

Scientific classification
- Kingdom: Plantae
- Clade: Tracheophytes
- Clade: Angiosperms
- Clade: Eudicots
- Clade: Rosids
- Order: Fagales
- Family: Fagaceae
- Genus: Quercus
- Subgenus: Quercus subg. Quercus
- Section: Quercus sect. Quercus
- Species: Q. ajoensis

Binomial name
- Quercus ajoensis C.H.Mull.
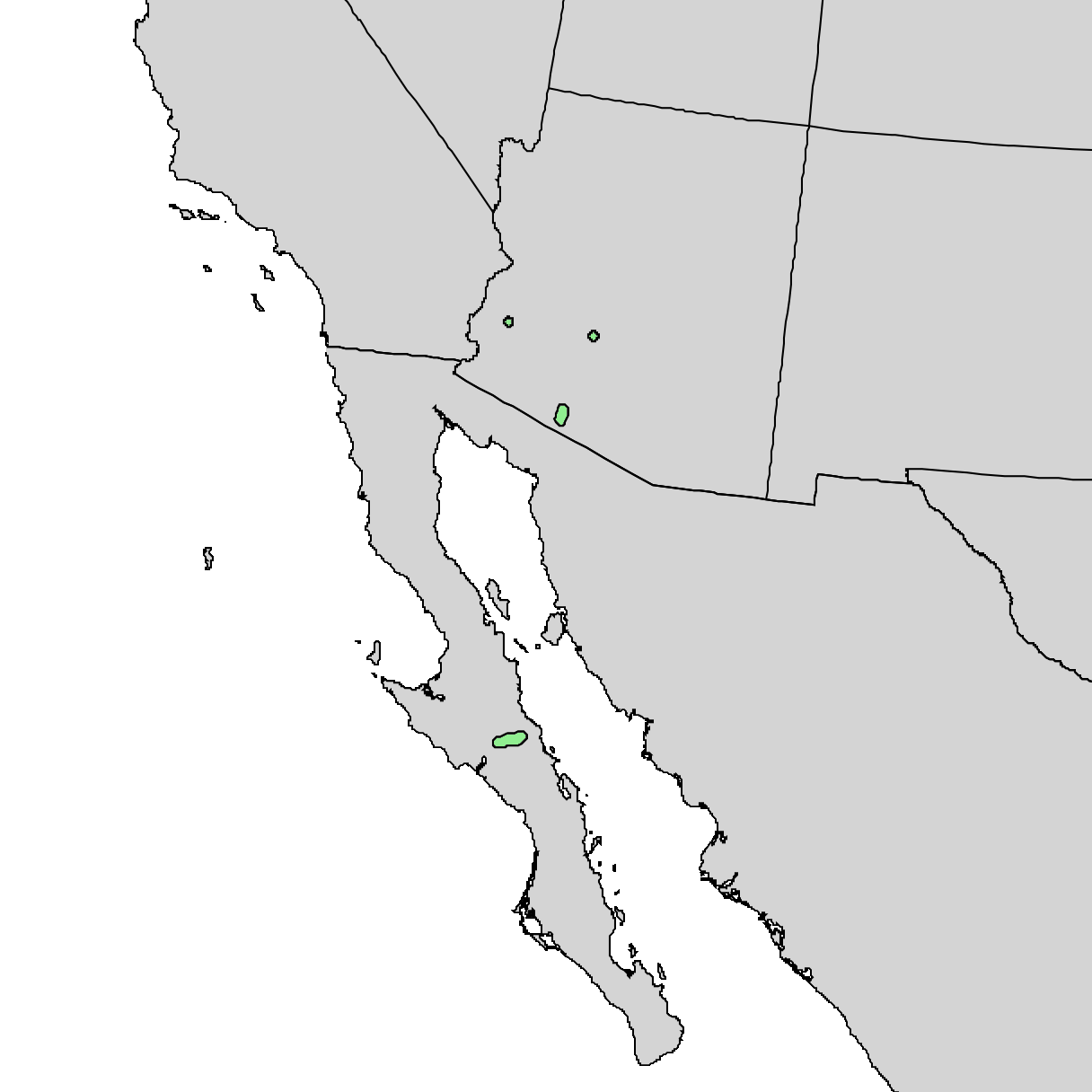
- Natural range of Quercus ajoensis

Synonyms
- Quercus turbinella var. ajoensis (C.H.Mull.) Little; Quercus turbinella subsp. ajoensis (C.H.Mull.) Felger & C.H.Lowe

= Quercus ajoensis =

Ajo Mountain Shrub oak

Species of shrub

Quercus ajoensis is an uncommon North American shrub with the common name Ajo Mountain shrub oak. It has been found in Arizona mountain ranges of the Colorado desert, and Arizona uplands of the Sonoran Desert. Q. ajoensis integrates with Q. turbinella and is difficult to determine specimen identification due to hybridization. It has sometimes been treated as a subspecies or variety of Q. turbinella rather than as a distinct species.

Q. ajoensis is usually a shrub but occasionally attains the stature of small trees up to 3 metres (10 feet) tall. The leaves are narrowly egg-shaped, up to 5 centimetres (2 inches) long, with sharp pointed teeth.

The species is named for the Ajo Mountains in western Pima County, Arizona, southwest of the town of Ajo. The species does not occur as an identifiable species outside the Ajo mountain range and most specimens are of integrated types with Q. turbinella. The word "ajo" is Spanish for "garlic."
