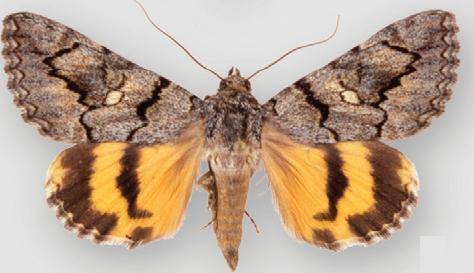

Scientific classification
- Kingdom: Animalia
- Phylum: Arthropoda
- Class: Insecta
- Order: Lepidoptera
- Superfamily: Noctuoidea
- Family: Erebidae
- Genus: Catocala
- Species: C. californiensis

Binomial name
- Catocala californiensis Brower, 1976

= Catocala californiensis =

Species of moth

Catocala californiensis is a moth of the family Erebidae. It is found in southern California.

Adults are on wing from June to July. There is probably one generation per year.

The larvae feed on Quercus turbinella.
