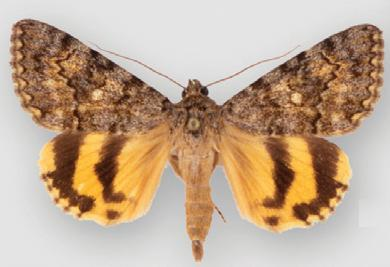
- Catocala benjamini benjamini

Scientific classification
- Kingdom: Animalia
- Phylum: Arthropoda
- Class: Insecta
- Order: Lepidoptera
- Superfamily: Noctuoidea
- Family: Erebidae
- Genus: Catocala
- Species: C. benjamini

Binomial name
- Catocala benjamini Brower, 1937

Synonyms
- Catocala andromache benjamini

= Catocala benjamini =

Benjamin's underwing

Species of moth

Catocala benjamini, or Benjamin's underwing, is a moth of the family Erebidae. The species was first described by Auburn Edmund Brower in 1937. It is found in the US states of Arizona, Nevada, southern California and southern Utah.

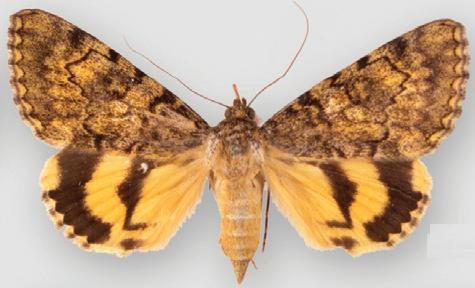
Catocala benjamini ute

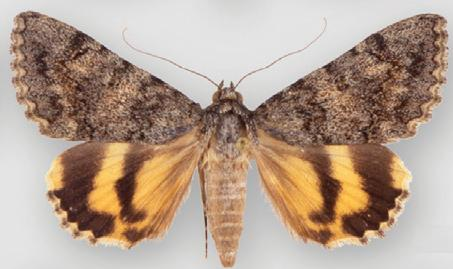
Catocala benjamini jumpi

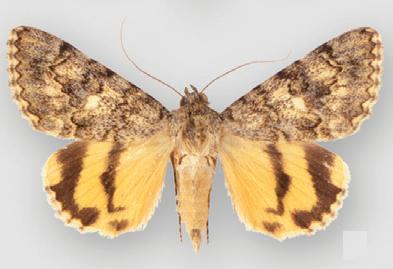
Catocala benjamini mayhewi

Catocala benjamini was formerly considered to be a subspecies of Catocala andromache.

Adults are on wing in June. There is probably one generation per year.

The larvae feed on Quercus gambelii (Gambel oak).

== Subspecies ==
- Catocala benjamini benjamini (south-eastern California, Arizona, southern Nevada, and south-western Utah)
- Catocala benjamini mayhewi Hawks, 2010 (along the desert-facing slopes of the Laguna, Santa Rosa, San Jacinto, San Bernardino, San Gabriel Mountains, and Little San Bernardino Mountains in southern California)
- Catocala benjamini jumpi Hawks, 2010 (Kofa Mountains, Arizona)
- Catocala benjamini ute Peacock & Wagner, 2009 (Grand and San Juan counties in south-eastern Utah)
