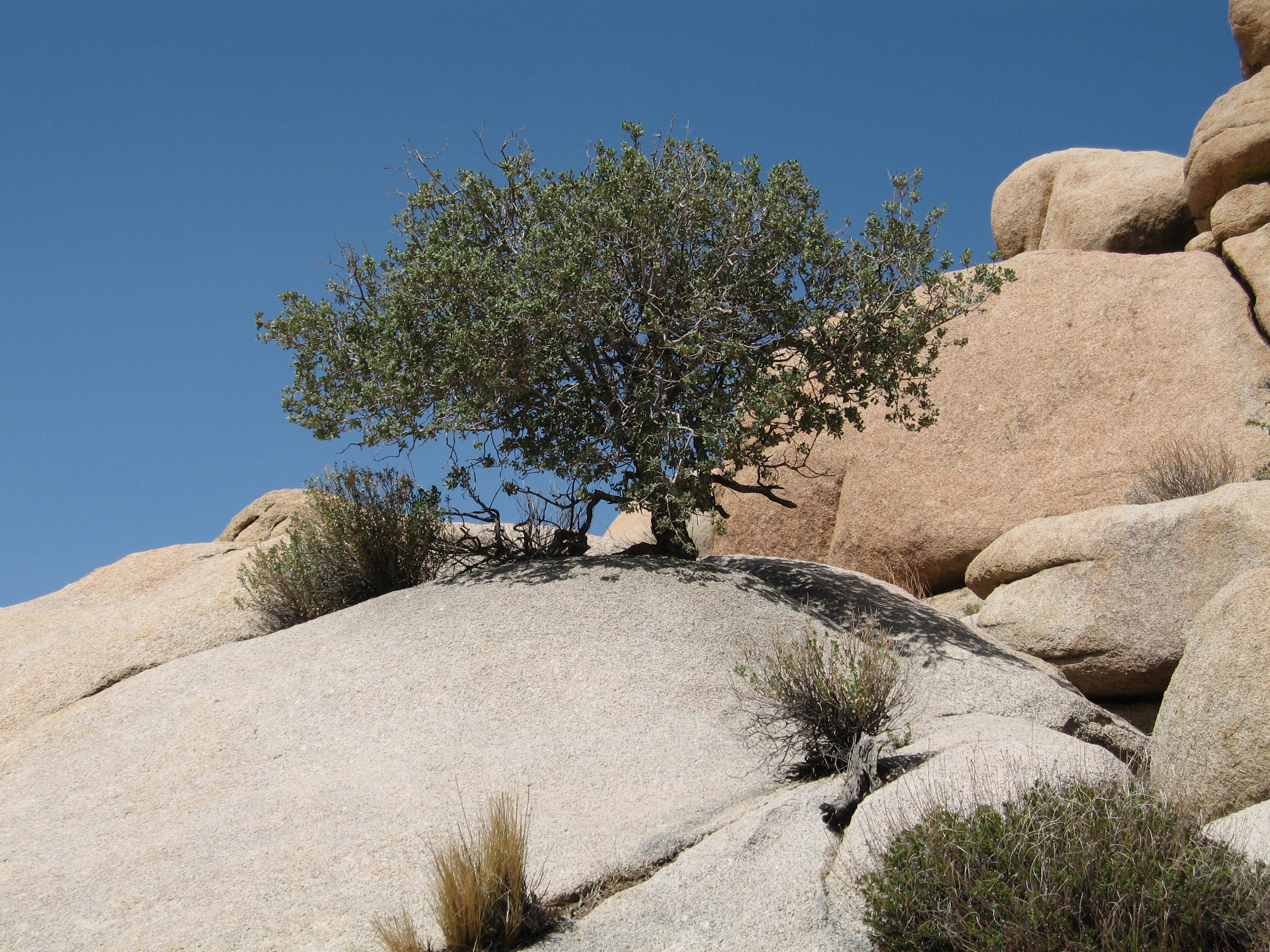

Conservation status
- Least Concern (IUCN 3.1)

- Apparently Secure (NatureServe)

Scientific classification
- Kingdom: Plantae
- Clade: Embryophytes
- Clade: Tracheophytes
- Clade: Spermatophytes
- Clade: Angiosperms
- Clade: Eudicots
- Clade: Rosids
- Order: Fagales
- Family: Fagaceae
- Genus: Quercus
- Subgenus: Quercus subg. Quercus
- Section: Quercus sect. Quercus
- Species: Q. cornelius-mulleri

Binomial name
- Quercus cornelius-mulleri Nixon & K.P.Steele

= Quercus cornelius-mulleri =

Muller's oak

Species of tree

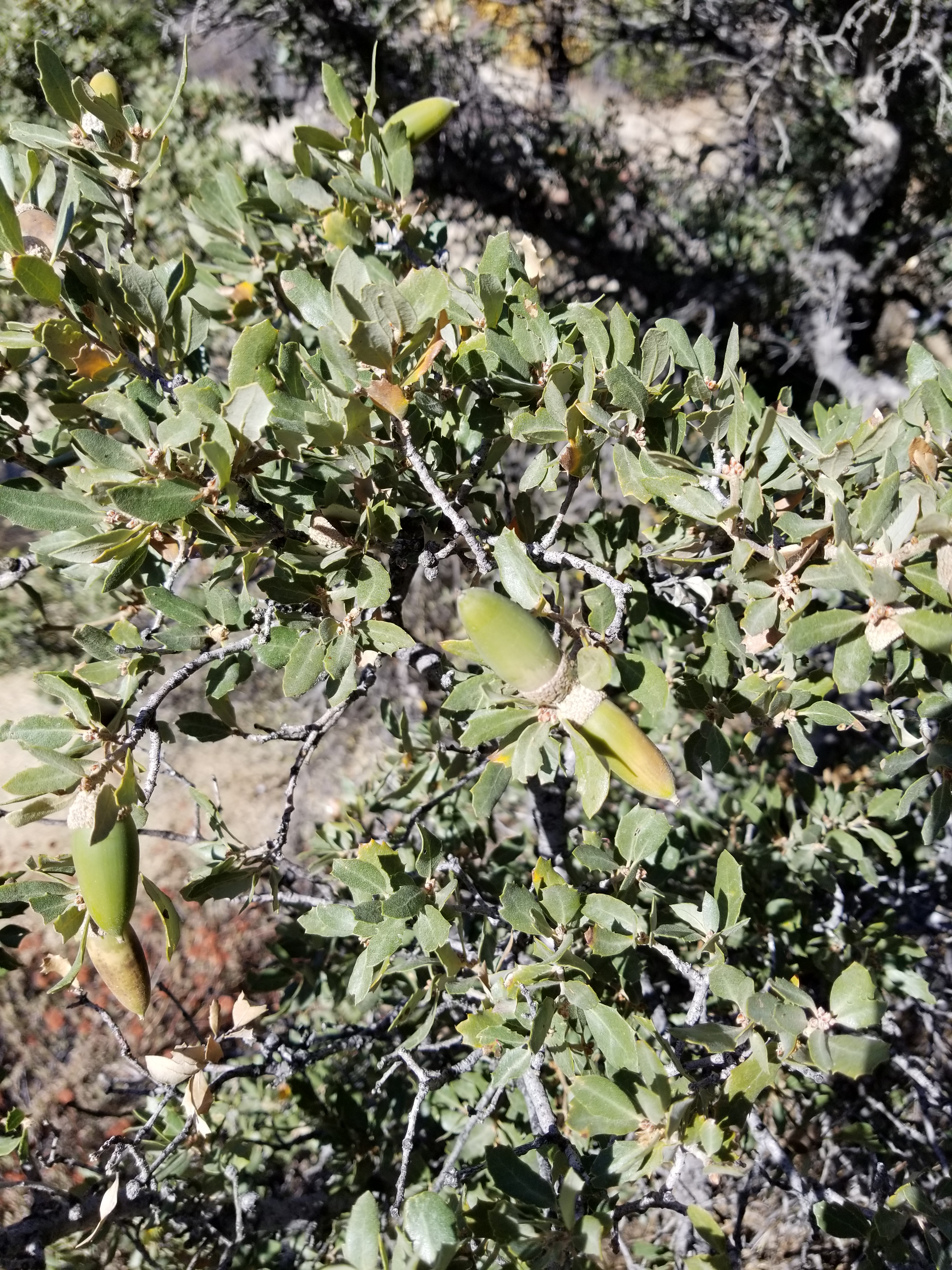
Quercus cornelius-mulleri acorns

Quercus cornelius-mulleri is a North American species of oak known by the common name Muller oak, or Muller's oak. It was described to science in 1981 when it was segregated from the Quercus dumosa complex and found to warrant species status of its own. It was named after ecologist Cornelius Herman Muller. It is native to southern California and Baja California, where it grows in chaparral, oak woodlands, and other habitat in foothills and mountains. It can most easily be observed in Joshua Tree National Park and in the woodlands along the western margins of the Colorado Desert in San Diego County, California.

== Description ==
Quercus cornelius-mulleri is a bushy shrub not exceeding 3 meters (10 feet) in height. It is densely branched, its tangled twigs gray, brown, or yellowish, fuzzy when new and becoming scaly with age.

The evergreen leaves are leathery and thick. They are bicolored: dull gray or yellow-green and faintly hairy on the upper surfaces, and white and quite woolly on the undersides. The wool on the undersides of the leaves is made up of star-shaped leaf hairs that are fused into microscopic plates. The leaf blades are oval with smooth or toothed edges, and measure 2.5 to 3.5 centimetres (1 to 1 1/2 inches) in length.

The fruit is an acorn with a cap up to 2 cm (3/4 in) wide covered in light-colored scales and a cylindrical, round-ended nut up to 3 cm (1 1/4 in) long.
