= Quercus × alvordiana =

Scientific classification
- Kingdom: Plantae
- Clade: Tracheophytes
- Clade: Angiosperms
- Clade: Eudicots
- Clade: Rosids
- Order: Fagales
- Family: Fagaceae
- Genus: Quercus
- Species: Q. × alvordiana

Binomial name
- Quercus × alvordiana Eastw.

Synonyms
- Quercus dumosa var. alvordiana (Eastw.) Jeps.

Hybrid species of oak tree

Quercus × alvordiana, the Alvord oak, is a hybrid oak in the genus Quercus. It is a naturally occurring hybrid between Quercus douglasii and Quercus john-tuckeri.

== Distribution ==
This hybrid is found throughout dry foothills of the Inner Coast Ranges (Diablo, Gabilan, Caliente, Temblor, Santa Lucia, Griswold Hills, etc.),Transverse Ranges (Tehachapi Mountains & Sierra Pelonas) and the southernmost portion of Sierra Nevada foothills. In certain xeric areas, hybrid swarms of Quercus x alvordiana become the dominant oak tree.

== Description ==
Quercus × alvordiana is generally semi-evergreen, but is highly variable. The growth structure is fairly arborescent, usually multi-trunked, and can reach up to 6 meters (20 feet) in height.
