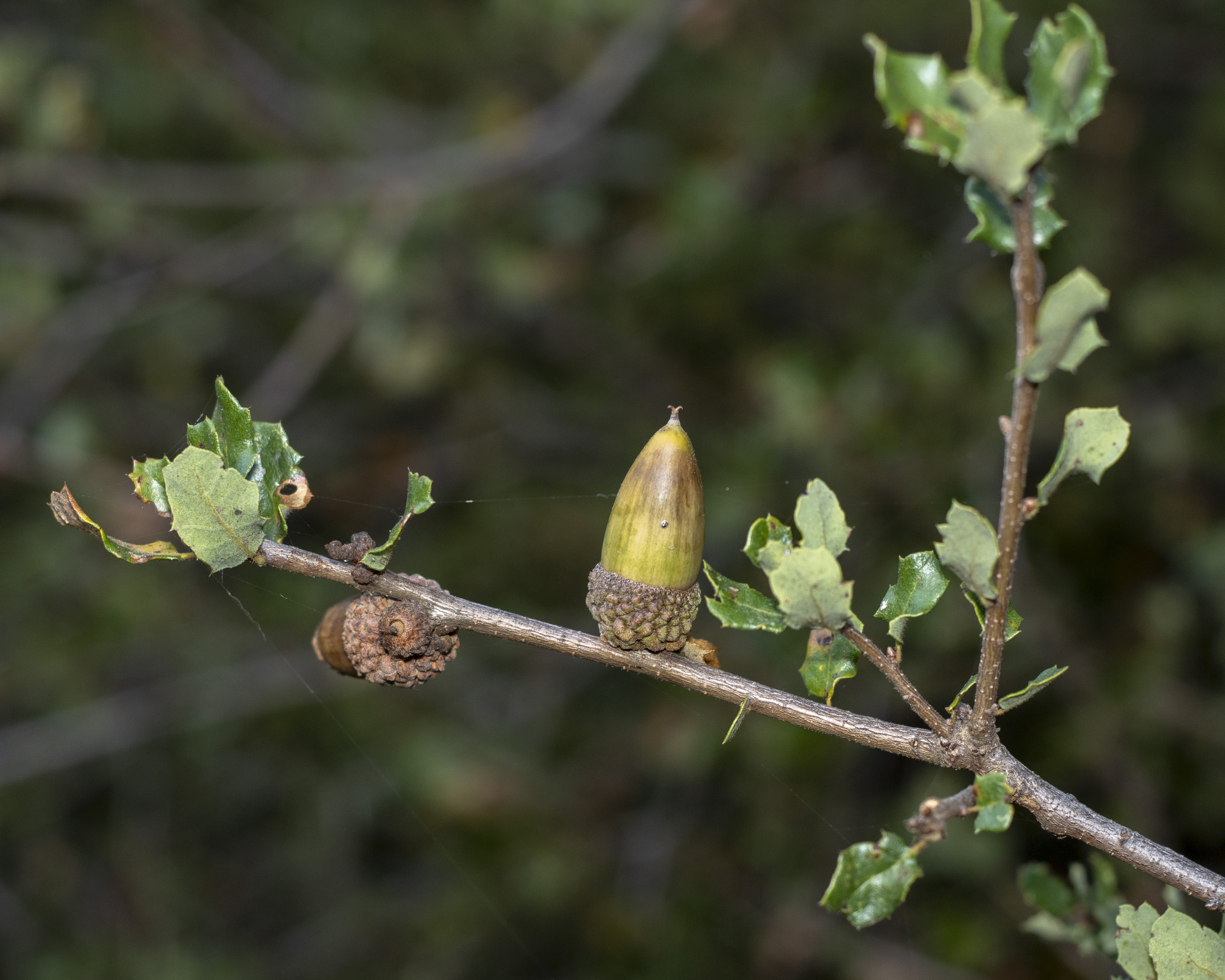
- The twigs, leaves, and acorn on Quercus dumosa in San Diego, California.

Conservation status
- Endangered (IUCN 3.1)

Scientific classification
- Kingdom: Plantae
- Clade: Tracheophytes
- Clade: Angiosperms
- Clade: Eudicots
- Clade: Rosids
- Order: Fagales
- Family: Fagaceae
- Genus: Quercus
- Subgenus: Quercus subg. Quercus
- Section: Quercus sect. Quercus
- Species: Q. dumosa

Binomial name
- Quercus dumosa Nutt.

= Quercus dumosa =

Nuttall's scrub oak

Species of oak tree

Quercus dumosa, commonly known as Nuttall's scrub oak or coastal sage scrub oak, is a species of scrub oak belonging to the white oak group (subgenus Quercus, section Quercus). It is a shrub typically reaching heights of 1–3 m (3.3–9.8 ft), characterized by a scraggly and rounded appearance, with dense tangled reddish branches, small dark green leaves with distinct teeth, curly trichomes on the lower leaf surfaces, and narrow acute acorns.

Native to the United States and Mexico, it is a rare species found in chaparral and coastal sage scrub on sandy soils often within sight of the ocean, and is found in disjunct populations ranging from Santa Barbara County, California south to the vicinity of Punta Colonet, Baja California. It is perhaps one of the rarest and most threatened species of oak in California, as the human development of coastal southern California has left very little habitat intact.

== Description ==
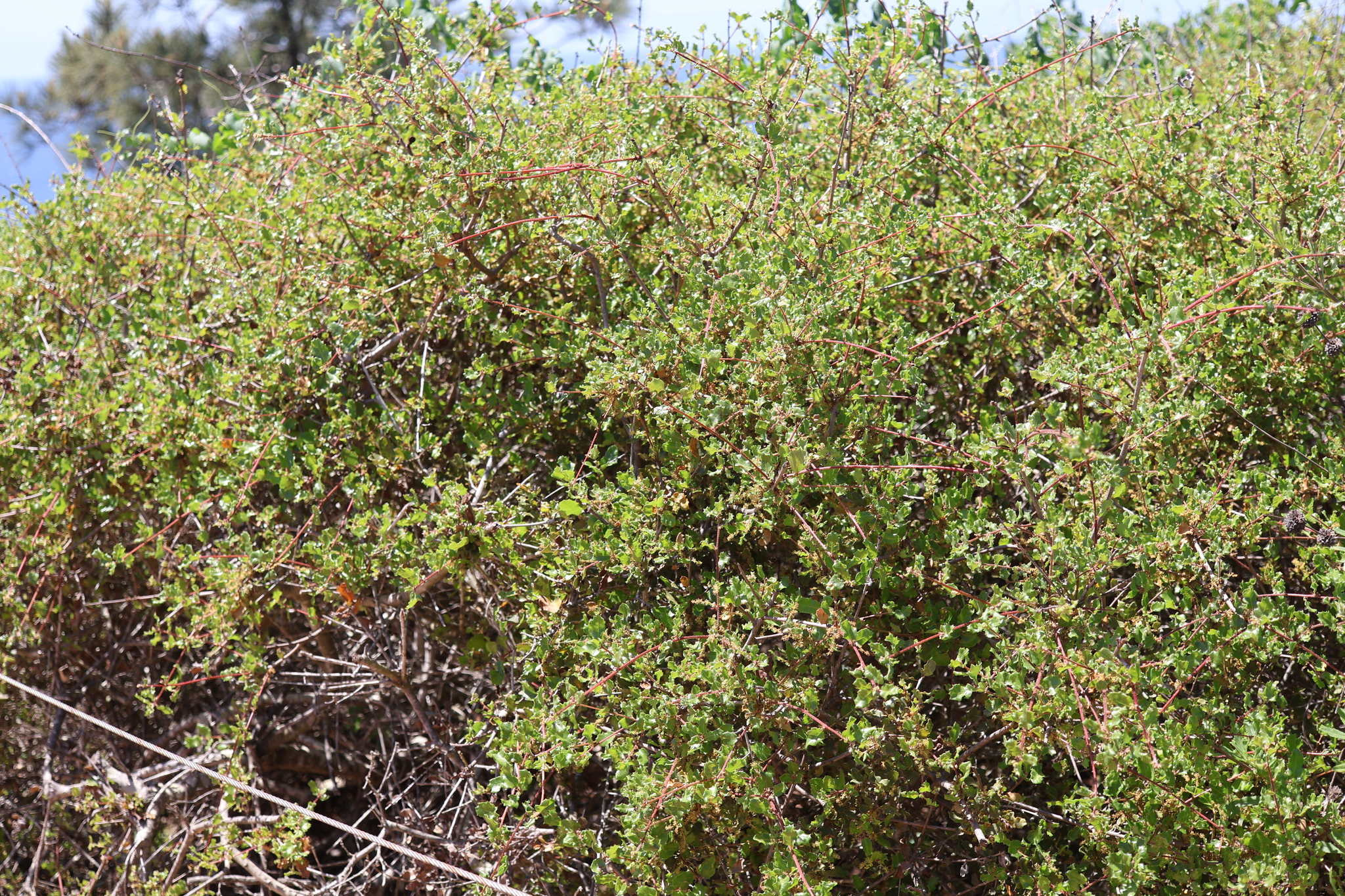
The typical scraggly, tangled habit of Quercus dumosa

Quercus dumosa is an evergreen shrub typically growing 1–3 m (3.3–9.8 ft) tall, with some plants up to 5 m (16 ft) tall observed in the canyons of San Diego County, and others occasionally taking the form of low, matted clumps. It has a rounded and scraggly appearance, with tangled, slender reddish or grayish twigs and branches. The branches are often sharply angled. The bark is smooth when young, but eventually becomes scaly. The dark-green leaves are brittle and leathery, and fall off when disturbed. The leaves have a short petiole 1–2 mm (0.039–0.079 in) long. The leaf blade is usually 10–20 mm (0.39–0.79 in) long and has an undulate or cupped appearance, with a cordate base. The leaf margins may be abruptly pointed with spines or teeth or shallowly lobed, and rarely entire (smooth).

One of the most distinctive characters of Quercus dumosa are the trichomes (hairs) most prominent on its lower leaf surfaces. It has erect, twisted (curly), multi-rayed trichomes up to 0.5 mm (0.020 in) long, a feature unlike any other scrub oaks. The trichomes at least require a dissecting scope or 10 power hand lens to clearly discern, but compared to other scrub oaks these trichomes are clearly visible to the naked eye.

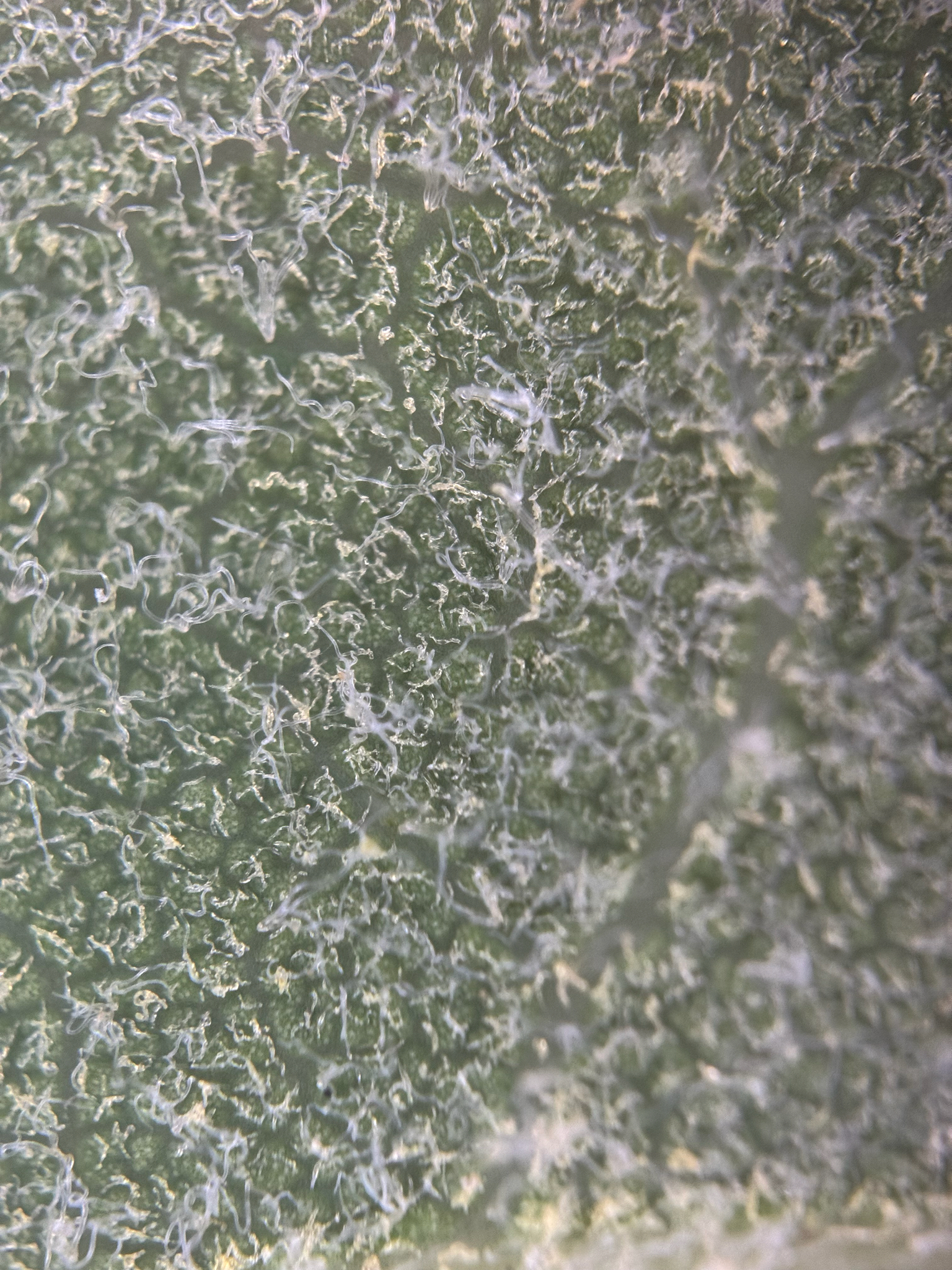
The trichomes of Quercus dumosa

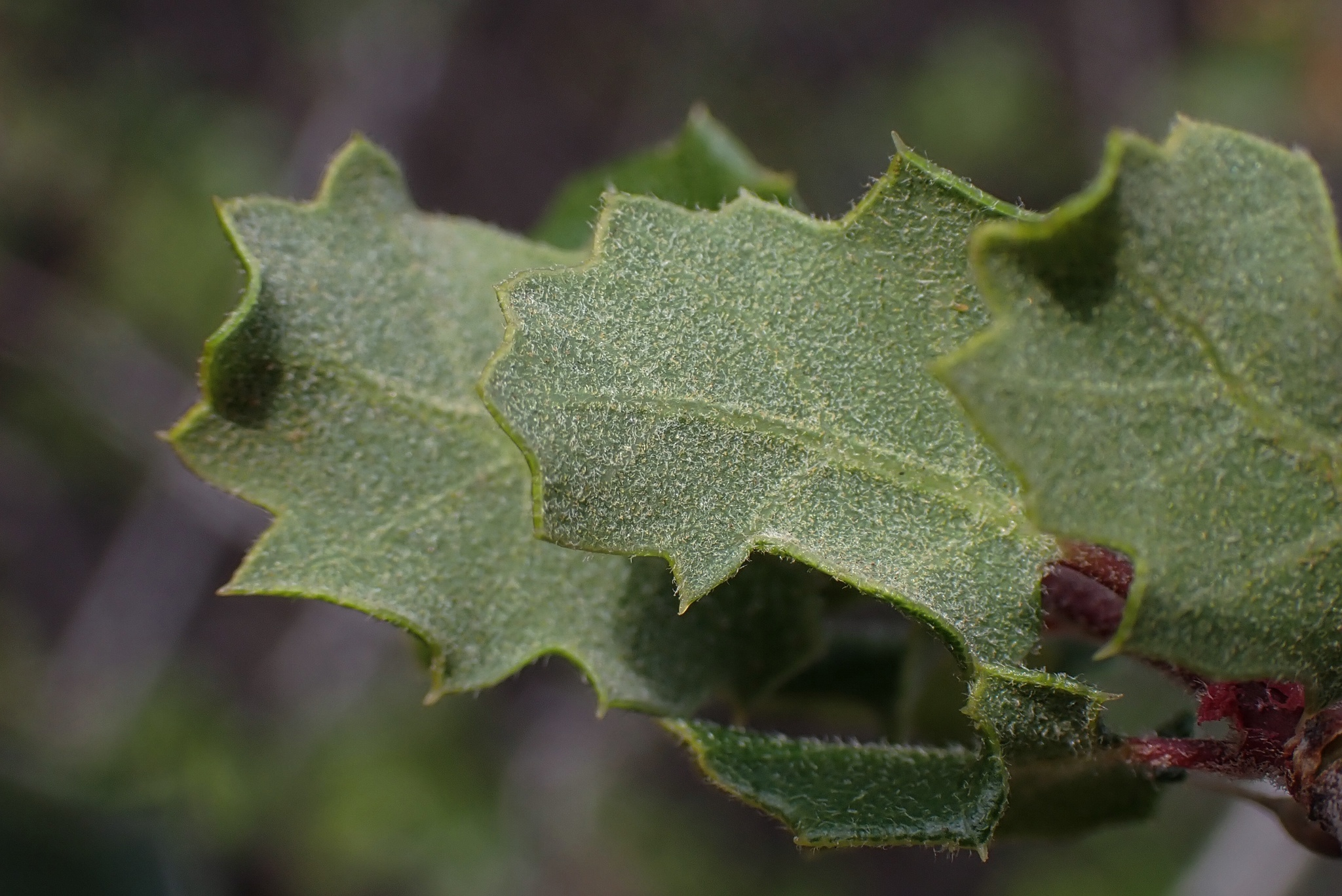
The underside of the leaves

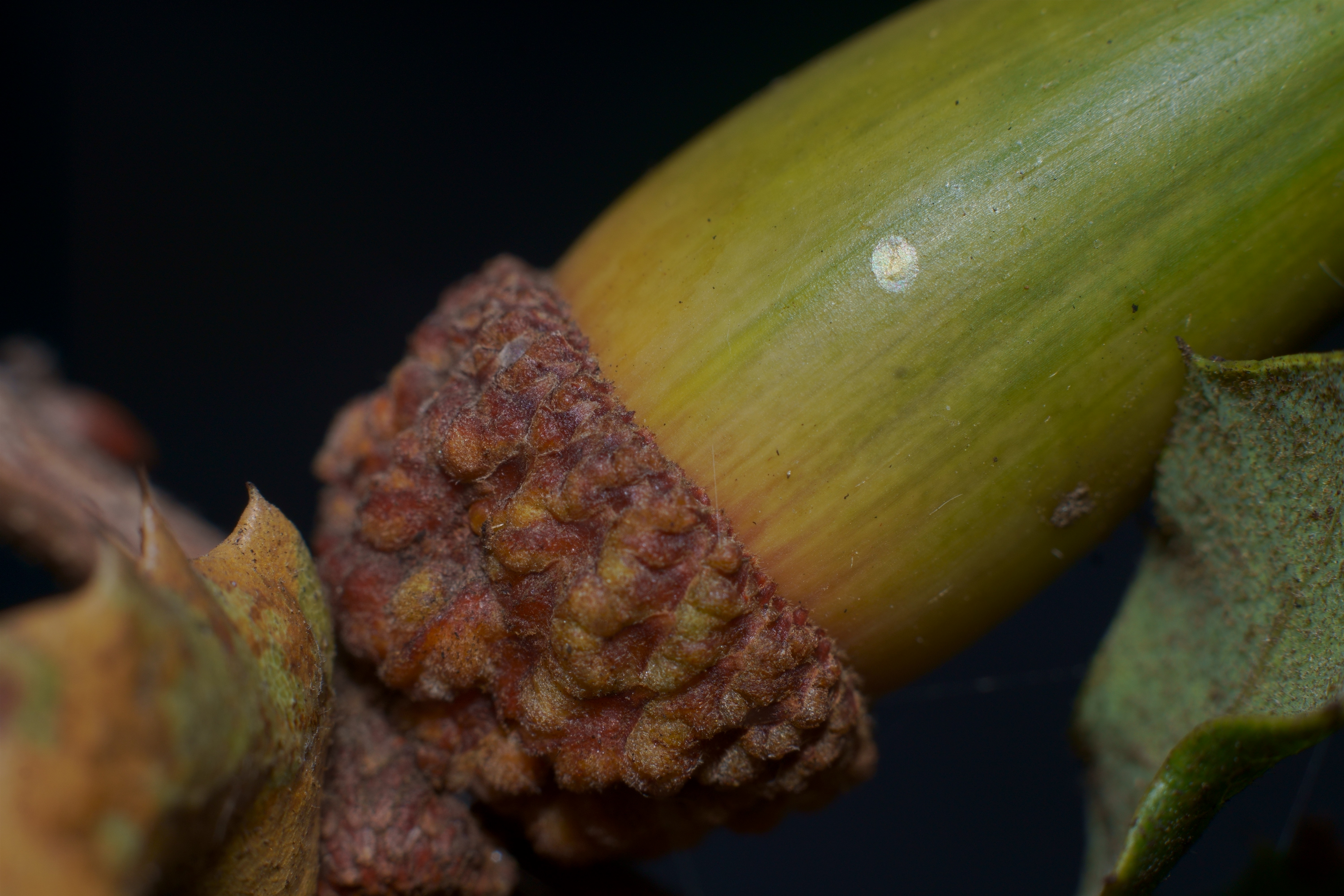
Detail of the acorn cap

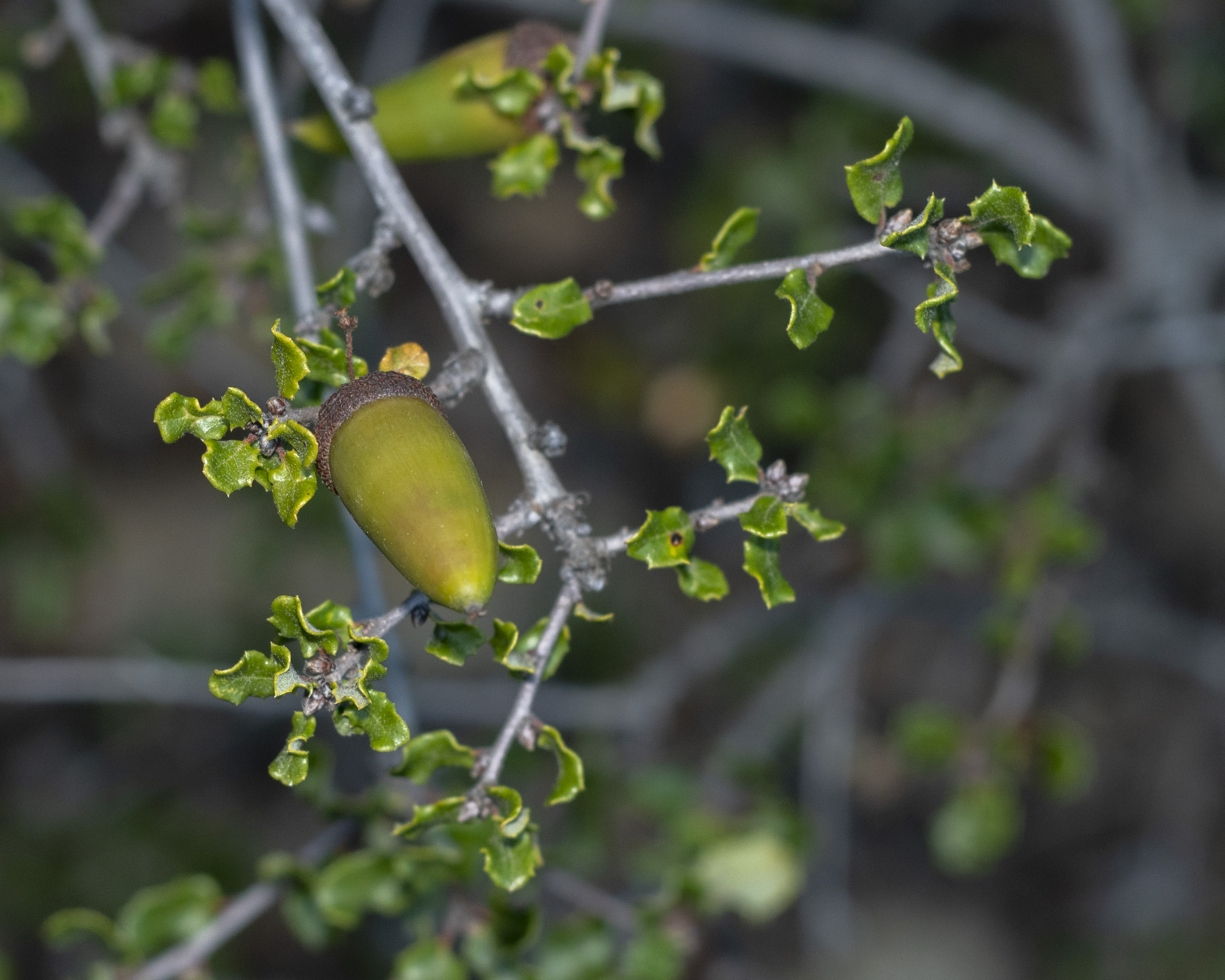
A maturing acorn with twigs and foliage

The male flowers are minute catkins that bloom from February through April.

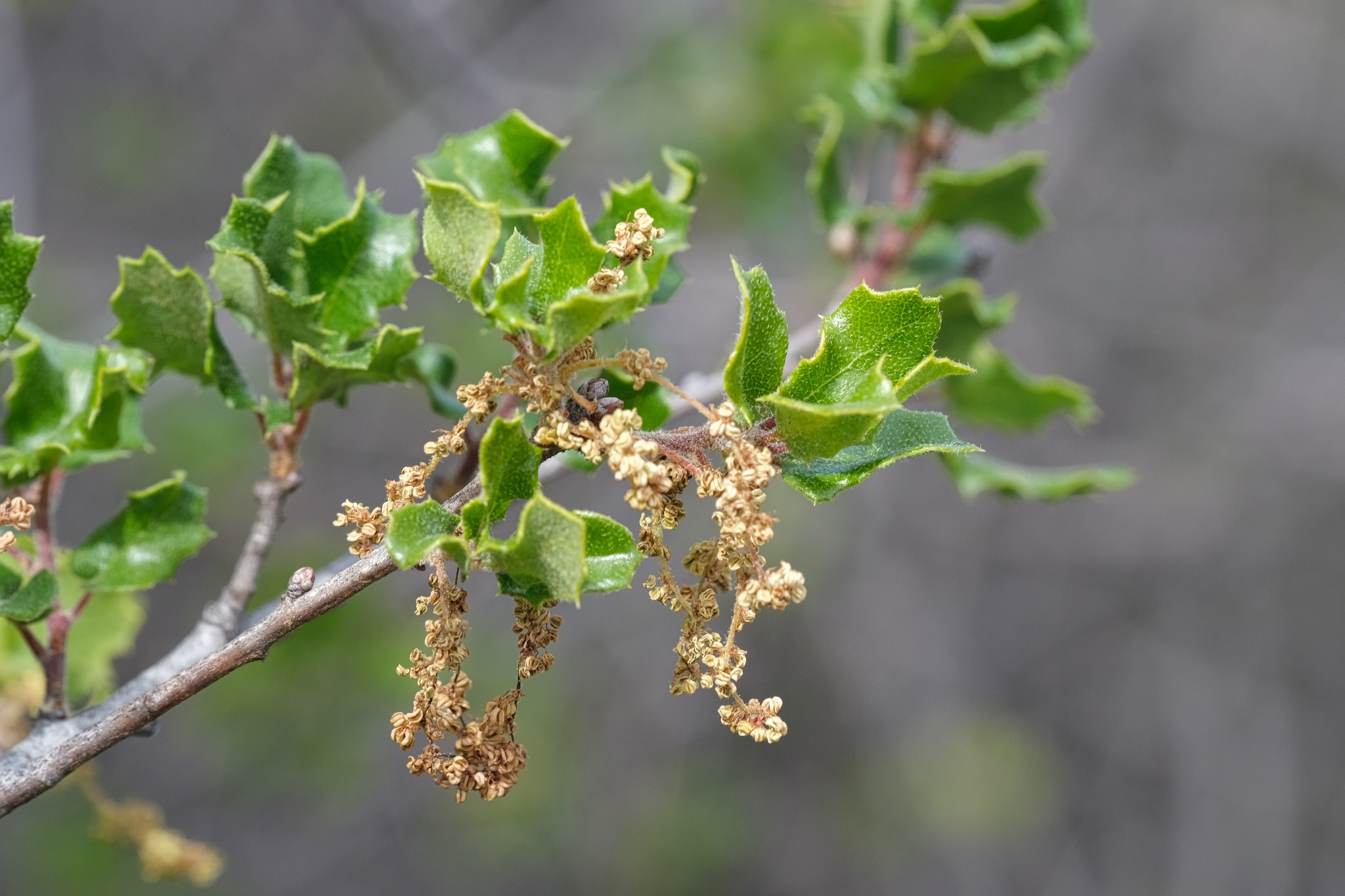
The catkins of Quercus dumosa

The fruit is a narrow acute acorn up to 1.5 centimetres (5/8 in) wide. Some individuals produce large crops of acorns, and some produce very few fruits. The acorns are dispersed by gravity as they fall from the tree, and by animals that pick them up, such as squirrels and jays. Animals eat them immediately or cache them for later. The acorns tend to germinate easily. Reproduction via seed generally occurs only in very moist years.

== Taxonomy ==
=== Taxonomic history ===
Quercus dumosa was originally described in 1842 by Thomas Nuttall from a type specimen collected in the "hills near Santa Barbara". For about 140 years after Nuttall's description, the concept of Quercus dumosa broadened to encompass nearly all of the scrub oaks in the white oak group of California and Baja California. Traditional taxonomies heavily relied on the leaf form as the distinguishing feature. As most of the California scrub white oak species have a similar leaf form, this resulted in a very broad concept of Q. dumosa (Q. dumosa sensu lato) that neglected other characters like acorn morphology and leaf vestiture.

The species concept of Q. dumosa has narrowed as taxonomic developments changed focus to patterns of variation in the trichomes, acorns, and habitats of white scrub oaks.

These developments followed with a number of species being segregated out from Q. dumosa sensu lato:

- Quercus cornelius-mulleri was the first species to be segregated out. It has minute overlapping trichomes and is found along the desert edges of mountains in southern California and Baja California.
- Quercus berberidifolia is the most widespread member to be recognized from Q. dumosa sensu lato. It has minute flat stellate trichomes with 7 to 8 rays, a relatively flat and waxy leaf, and usually barrel-shaped, rounded or blunt acorns. It is common and widespread in interior habitats west of the deserts from the foothills of the Sierra Nevada to the California Coast Ranges and south into northwestern Baja California.
- Quercus john-tuckeri is a species that has also been included within another species complex, that of Quercus turbinella sensu lato, but has a number of subtle differences and is more similar to Q. berberidifolia. This species is mostly found in interior Central California.
- Quercus pacifica is restricted to three of the California Channel Islands and closely resembles Q. berberidifolia, but has more acute-tapering acorns with thinner cups and spatulate leaves with a narrowed leaf base. It is likely related to Q. berberidifolia and may also represent a nothospecies derived from intergradation between Q. berberidifolia and Q. douglasii.

=== Modern classification ===
Q. dumosa belongs to the white oak group (subgenus Quercus, section Quercus).

With most of the distinct species spun off, Q. dumosa now encompasses the oaks that match Nuttall's type material (Q. dumosa sensu stricto). The current concept of Q. dumosa is limited to the populations of scraggly shrub oaks with short petioles, cordate leaf bases, erect curly multi-rayed trichomes on the abaxial leaf surface that are visible to the naked eye, and narrow, acute acorns. This stricter conception of Q. dumosa matching the type material has also revealed its rarity, as it is only found in very restricted coastal habitats, making it perhaps one of the rarest and most threatened oaks in California.

=== Hybridization ===
Oaks hybridize extensively with other members of their subgenus. Quercus dumosa has a number of natural hybrids where it comes into contact with other white oak species. In the north-central coastal area of San Diego County, from Del Mar to Carlsbad and Poway, populations of Quercus dumosa grow and hybridize freely with Quercus berberidifolia. Putative hybrids of these same parents also occur at elevations above the populations of Q. dumosa in Santa Barbara County.

Quercus × kinselae (C.H.Mull.) Nixon & C.H.Mull., commonly known as Kinsel's oak, is a named hybrid that is a cross between Q. dumosa and Q. lobata. It is an evergreen shrub or small tree known only from the Santa Ynez Mountains in Santa Barbara County.

=== Etymology ===
Quercus dumosa is commonly known as Nuttall's scrub oak or coastal sage scrub oak.

== Distribution and habitat ==
=== Distribution ===
Quercus dumosa is native to the U.S. state of California and the Mexican state of Baja California. It is found near the coast from southern Santa Barbara County and disjunctly to the south through Orange County and San Diego County into northwestern Baja California.

In Santa Barbara County, it is found in Mission Canyon on the south slope of the Santa Ynez Mountains and above Carpinteria. In Orange County, it is found on the coast in the San Joaquin Hills and the Dana Point headlands. In San Diego County it is found from the central coast to around 10 km (6.2 mi) inland, south to the Mexico–United States border. It extends from there into northwestern Baja California, south along the coastal hills to the Punta Banda, into the vicinity of San Vicente, and reaches its southern limit near the Colonet peninsula. It is found from sea level to about 300 m (980 ft) in elevation.

=== Habitat ===
Quercus dumosa is only found in very restricted habitats. It prefers very loose sandstone or granitic soils, and is often in association with species of the "soft chaparral" and coastal sage scrub communities found near the coast. Its habitats include coastal hills, mesic slopes, canyons and coastal bluffs, maritime succulent scrub, and closed-cone pine forests. While rare, this species usually dominates or codominates the habitats where it is found. It usually thrives in sandy soils where it can develop extensive root networks.

It is threatened by habitat loss. The human development of coastal southern California has left very little habitat intact.

== Ecology ==
Quercus dumosa grows primarily in sandy soils such as sandstone near the coast. Its habitat is often chaparral. This oak sprouts vigorously from its stump and root crown after wildfire and develops a large canopy within a few years after a fire event. It sometimes co-dominates with Ceanothus species as early as four years after a fire. This oak also does well in the absence of fire.

== Allergenicity ==
The species is a severe allergen, with pollination generally occurring in spring.

== See also ==
- California chaparral and woodlands
