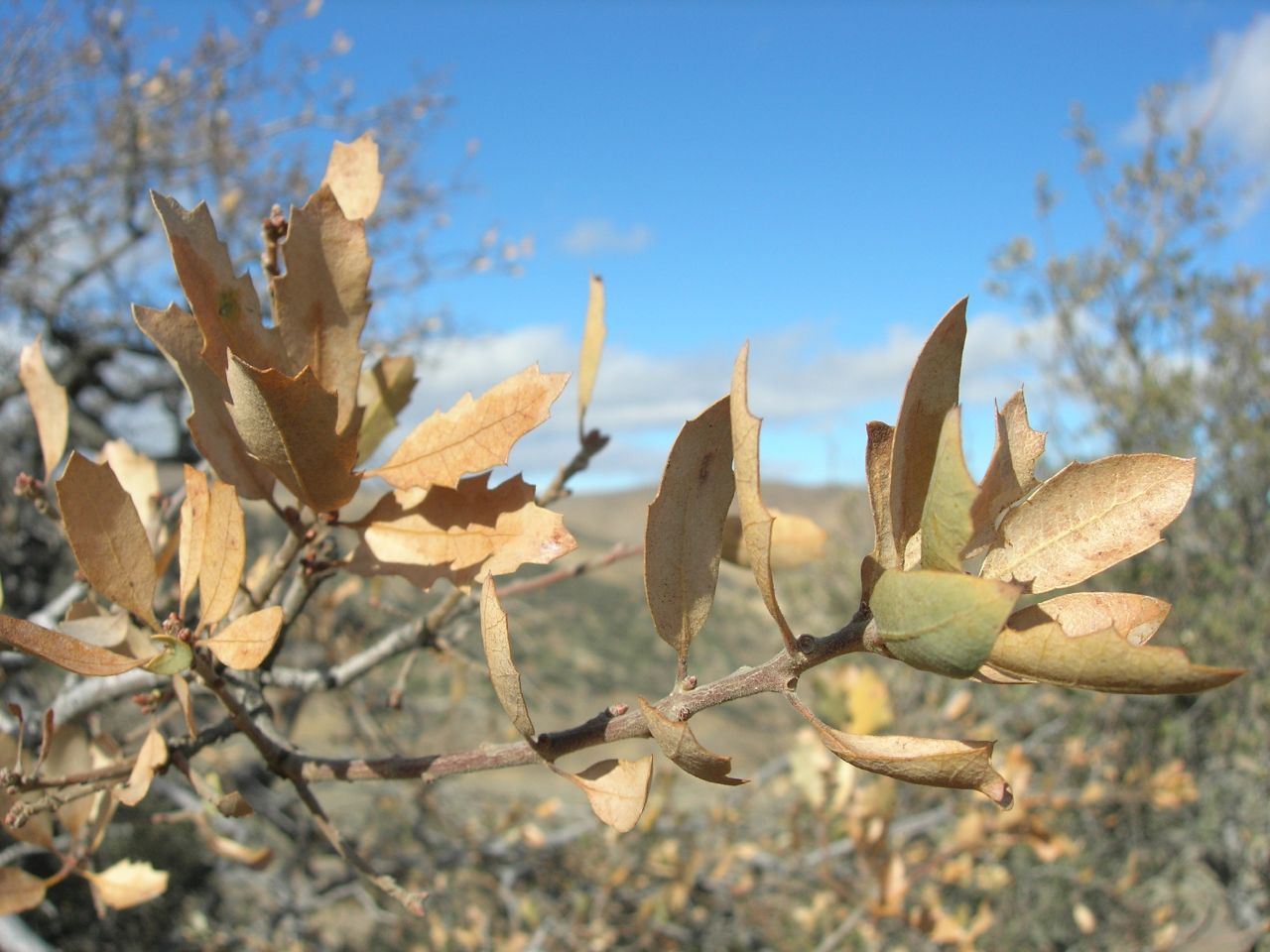

Conservation status
- Least Concern (IUCN 3.1)

Scientific classification
- Kingdom: Plantae
- Clade: Embryophytes
- Clade: Tracheophytes
- Clade: Angiosperms
- Clade: Eudicots
- Clade: Rosids
- Order: Fagales
- Family: Fagaceae
- Genus: Quercus
- Subgenus: Quercus subg. Quercus
- Section: Quercus sect. Quercus
- Species: Q. john-tuckeri

Binomial name
- Quercus john-tuckeri Nixon & C.H.Mull.

Synonyms
- Quercus turbinella subsp. californica Tucker; Quercus turbinella var. californica (Tucker) L.D.Benson

= Quercus john-tuckeri =

Tucker's oak

Species of oak tree

Quercus john-tuckeri is a North American species of oak known by the common name Tucker oak, or Tucker's oak. It is endemic to California, where it grows in the chaparral and oak woodlands of mountain slopes in the western Transverse Ranges, the southernmost Central Coast Ranges, and the margins of the Mojave Desert. The species is named after John M. Tucker, professor of botany (1947–1986) at the University of California, Davis, specialist in Quercus.

== Description ==
Quercus john-tuckeri is a bushy shrub growing up to 2 to 5 meters (6 1/2 to 16 1/2 feet) in height, sometimes becoming treelike, exceeding 6 m (20 ft). The branches are gray or brown, the twigs coated in short woolly fibers when new and becoming scaly with age. The evergreen leaves are leathery and thick, sometimes brittle. They are gray-green, the lower surface slightly paler. The undersides are hairy, the upper surfaces somewhat less so. The leaf blade is roughly oval, spine-toothed, and less than 4 centimeters (1 1/2 inches) long. The fruit is an acorn with a thin cap 1 to 1.5 cm (3/8 to 5/8 in) wide and a nut 2 to 3 cm (3/4 to 1 1/8 in) long.

== See also ==
- Quercus × alvordiana
