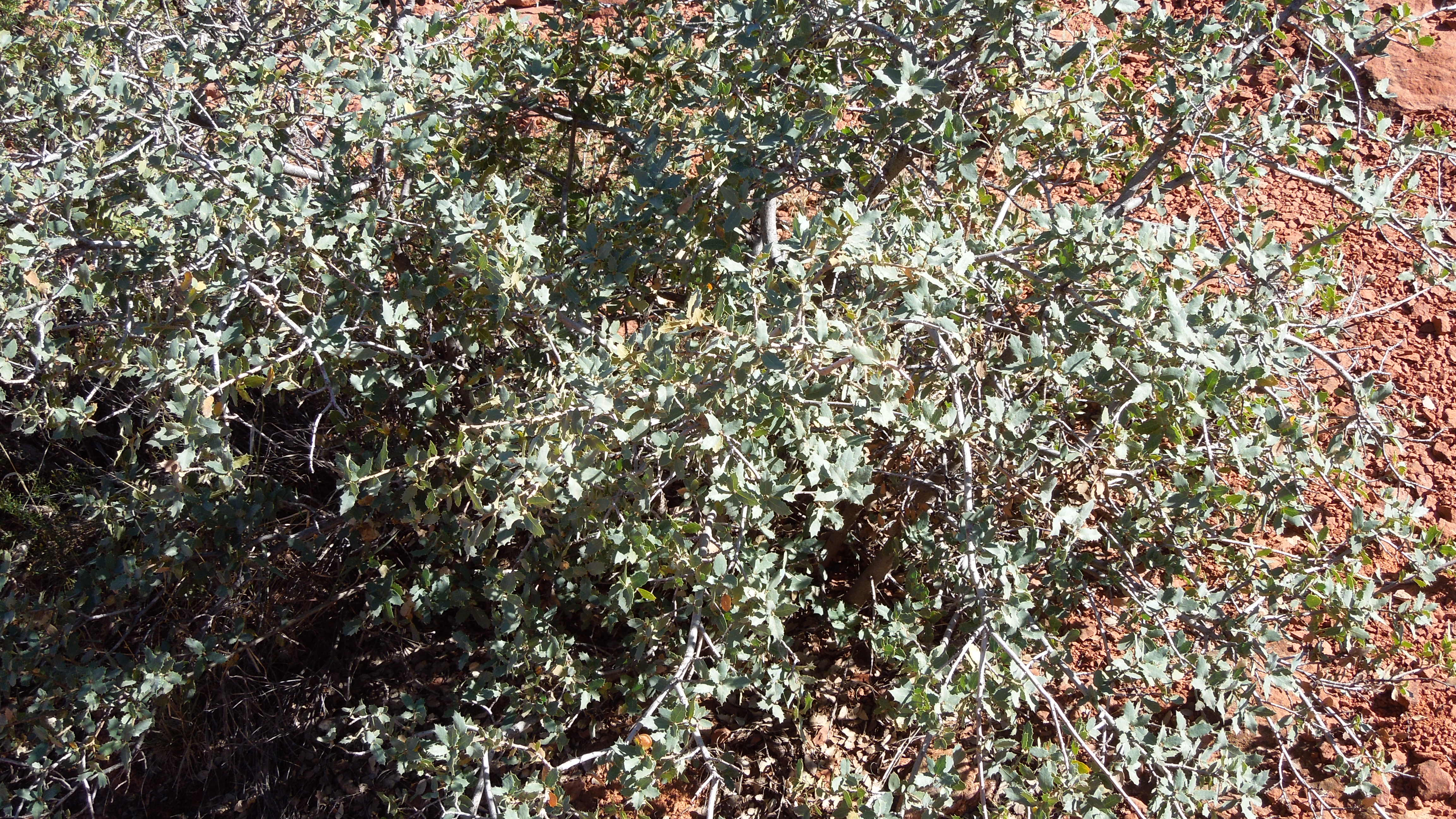

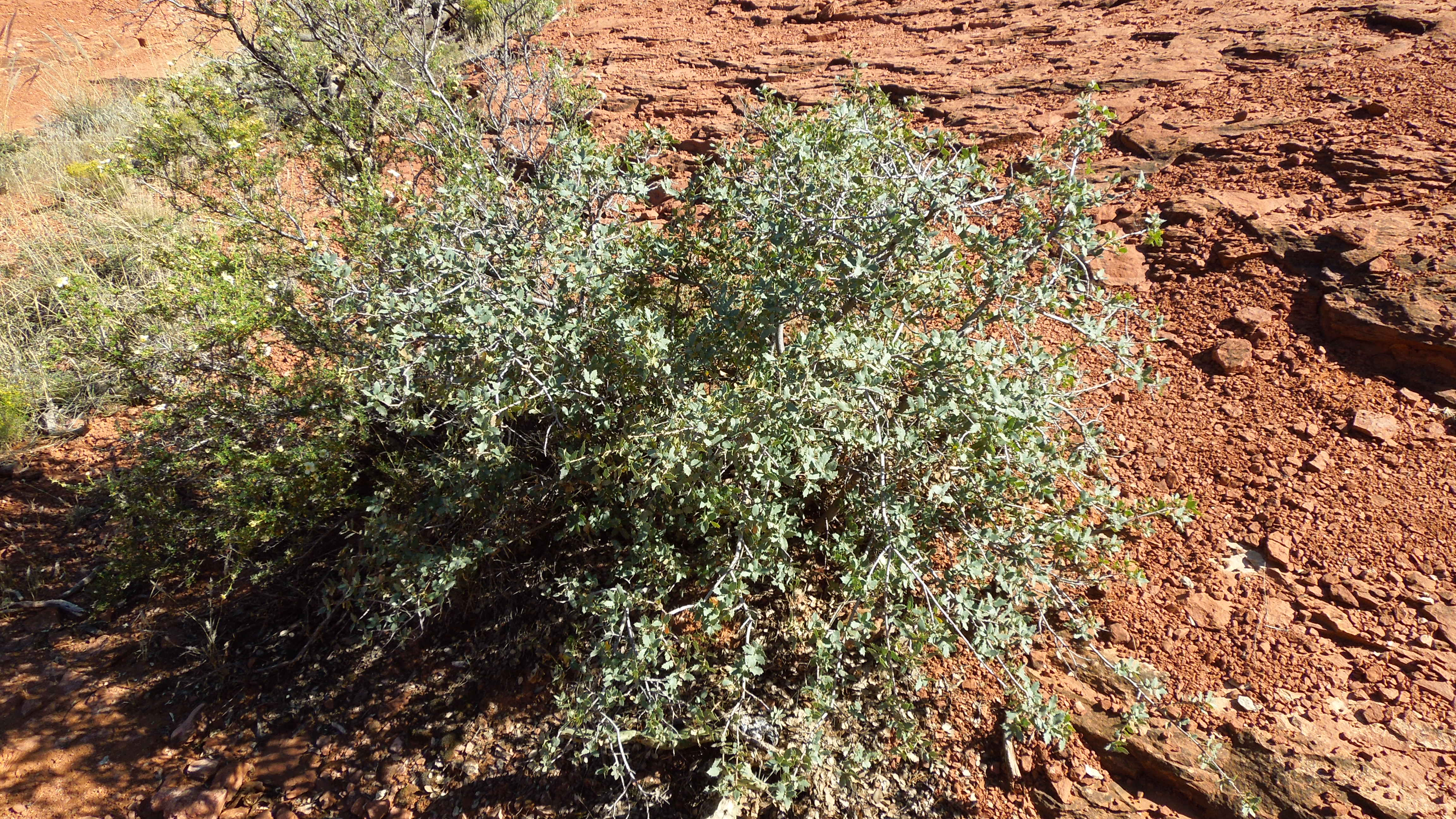

Conservation status
- Least Concern (IUCN 3.1)

- Secure (NatureServe)

Scientific classification
- Kingdom: Plantae
- Clade: Embryophytes
- Clade: Tracheophytes
- Clade: Spermatophytes
- Clade: Angiosperms
- Clade: Eudicots
- Clade: Rosids
- Order: Fagales
- Family: Fagaceae
- Genus: Quercus
- Subgenus: Quercus subg. Quercus
- Section: Quercus sect. Quercus
- Species: Q. turbinella

Binomial name
- Quercus turbinella Greene
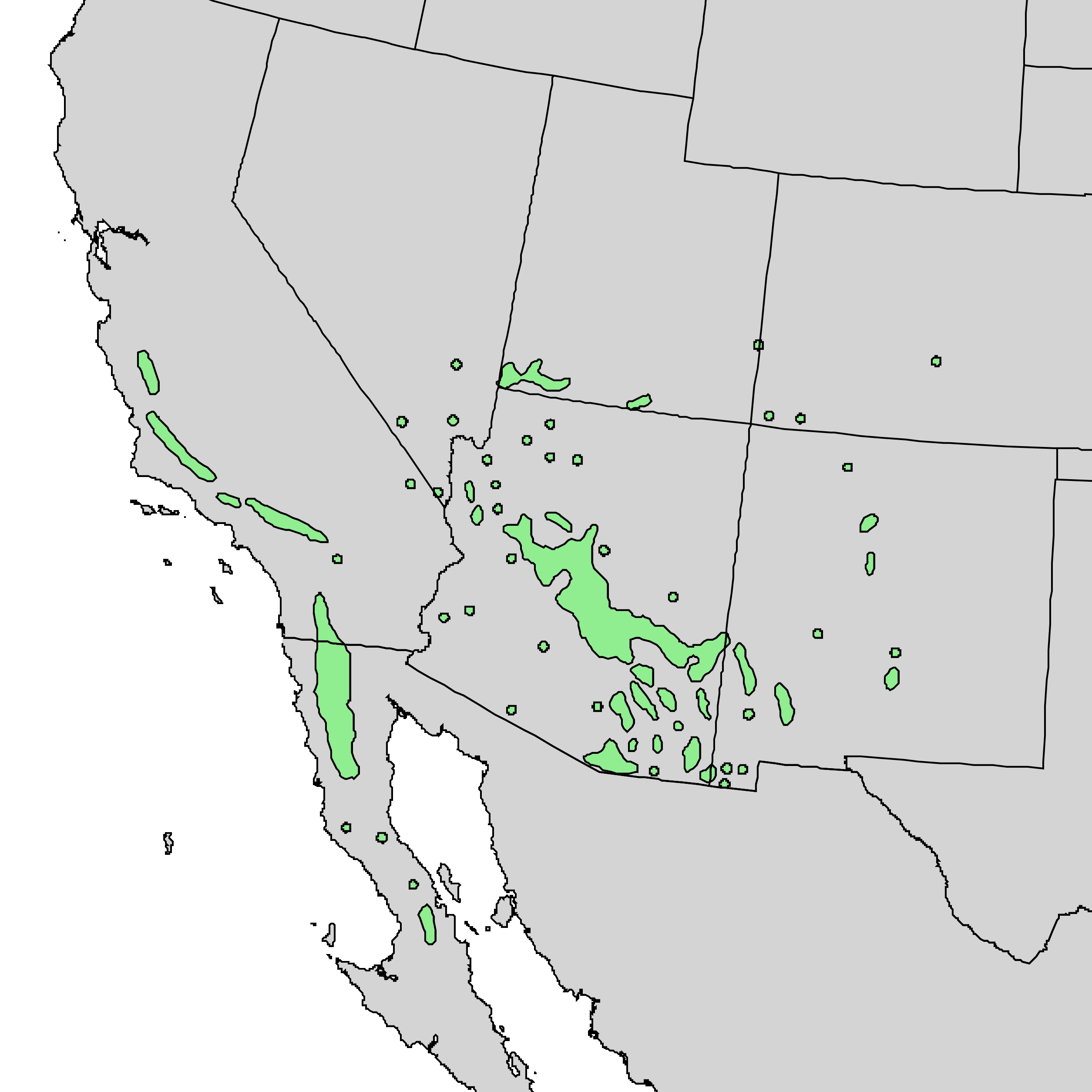
- Natural range

Synonyms
- List: Quercus dumosa subsp. turbinella (Greene) A.E.Murray (1983); Quercus dumosa var. turbinella (Greene) Jeps. (1910); Quercus subturbinella Trel.(1924)

= Quercus turbinella =

Species of oak shrub

Quercus turbinella is a North American species of oak known by the common names shrub oak, turbinella oak, shrub live oak, and gray oak. It is native to Arizona, California, New Mexico, Utah, Colorado, and Nevada in the western United States. It also occurs in northern Mexico.

== Description ==
Quercus turbinella is a shrub growing 2–5 metres (6 1/2–16 1/2 feet) in height but sometimes becoming treelike and exceeding 6 m (20 ft). The branches are gray or brown, the twigs often coated in short woolly fibers when young and becoming scaly with age. The thick, leathery evergreen leaves are up to 3 centimetres (1 1/4 inches) long by 2 cm (3/4 in) wide and are edged with large, spine-tipped teeth. They are gray-green to yellowish in color and waxy in texture on the upper surfaces, and yellowish and hairy or woolly and glandular on the lower surfaces. The males catkins are yellowish-green and the female flowers are in short spikes in the leaf axils, appearing at the same time as the new growth of leaves. The fruit is a yellowish brown acorn up to two centimeters long with a shallow warty cup about a centimeter wide. This oak reproduces sexually via its acorns if there is enough moisture present, but more often it reproduces vegetatively by sprouting from its rhizome and root crown.

== Distribution ==
Quercus turbinella has been found in Arizona, New Mexico, Colorado, Utah, Nevada, southern California, and western Texas, as well as Baja California. In California, it occurs in the New York mountains and a few eastern California desert ranges. The populations on the desert mountains in the western Mojave desert and the inner coastal ranges are now considered Quercus john-tuckeri. It grows in woodland, chaparral, forest, and other habitat. It is most common in chaparral habitat in central Arizona, through the transition zone of the Mogollon Rim–White Mountains, but also southeast Arizona in the Madrean Sky Island mountain ranges of sky islands.

== Ecology ==
Quercus turbinella easily hybridizes with other oak species, including Quercus gambelii, Q. havardii, Q. arizonica, and Q. grisea. Many species of animals use it for food, with wild and domesticated ungulates browsing the foliage and many birds and mammals eating the acorns. Animals also use the shrub as cover, and mountain lions hide their kills in the thickets.

== Gallery ==
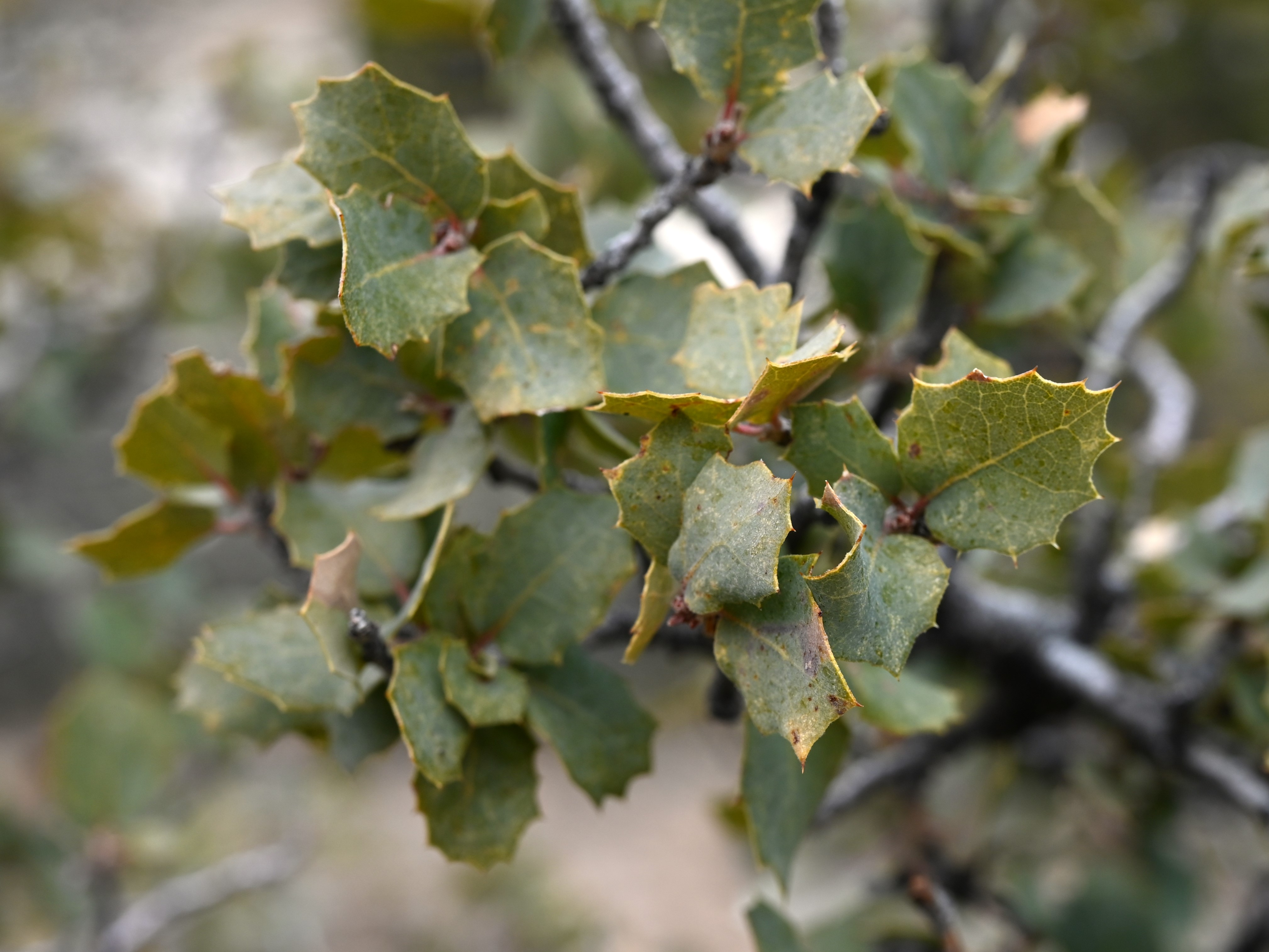
Detail of leaves.

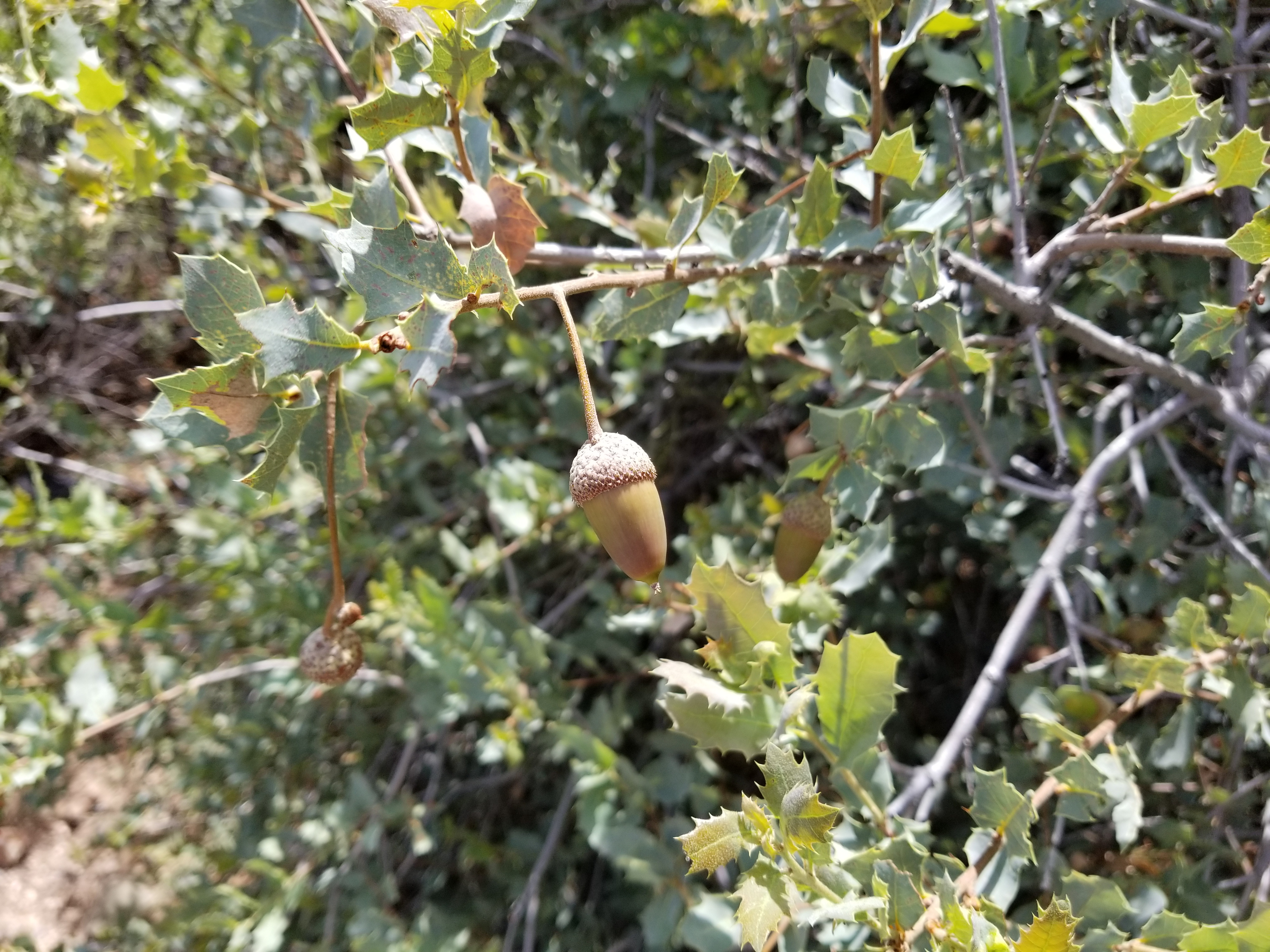
Arizona shrub oak acorns. Quercus turbinella

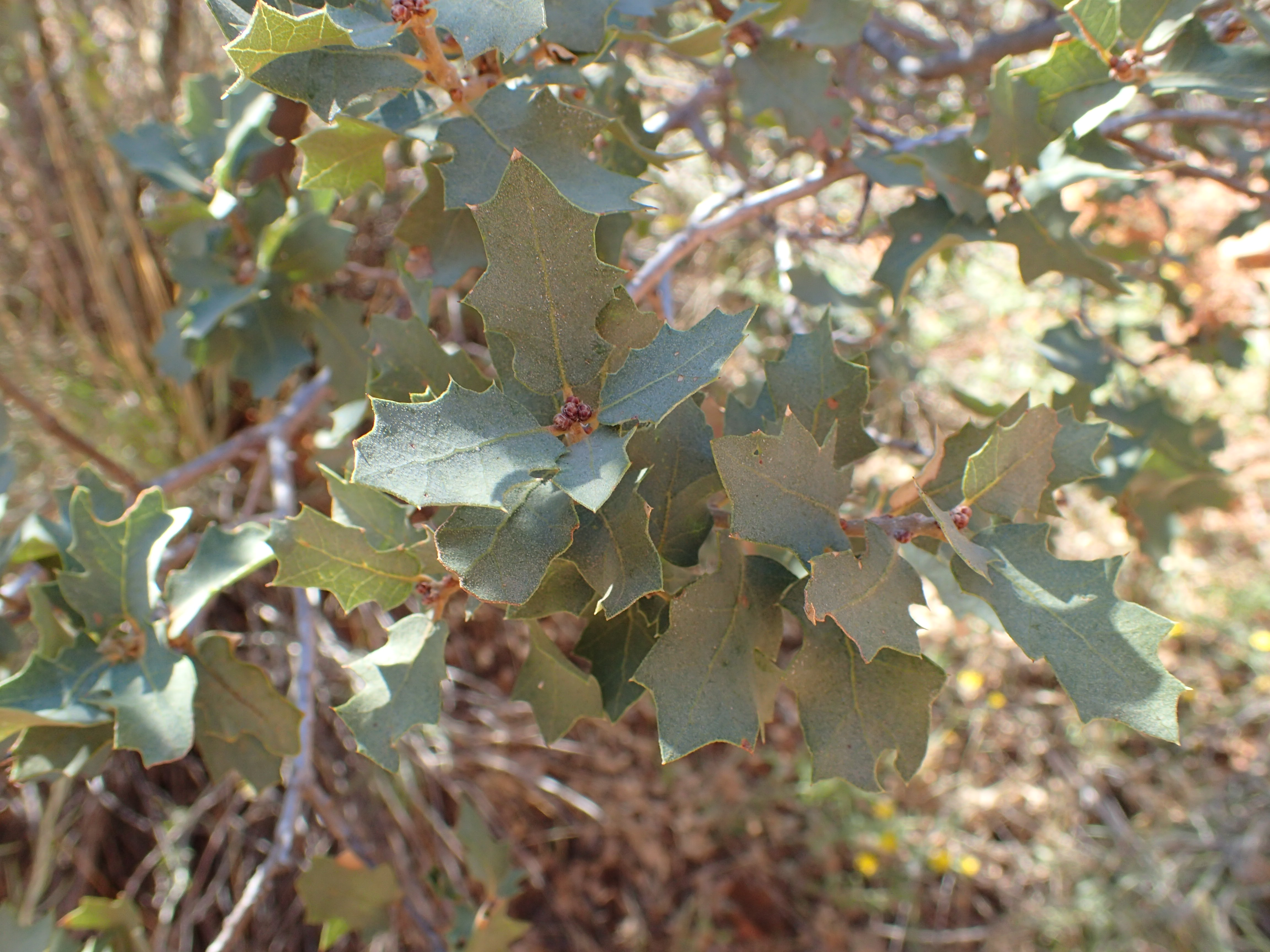
Leaves

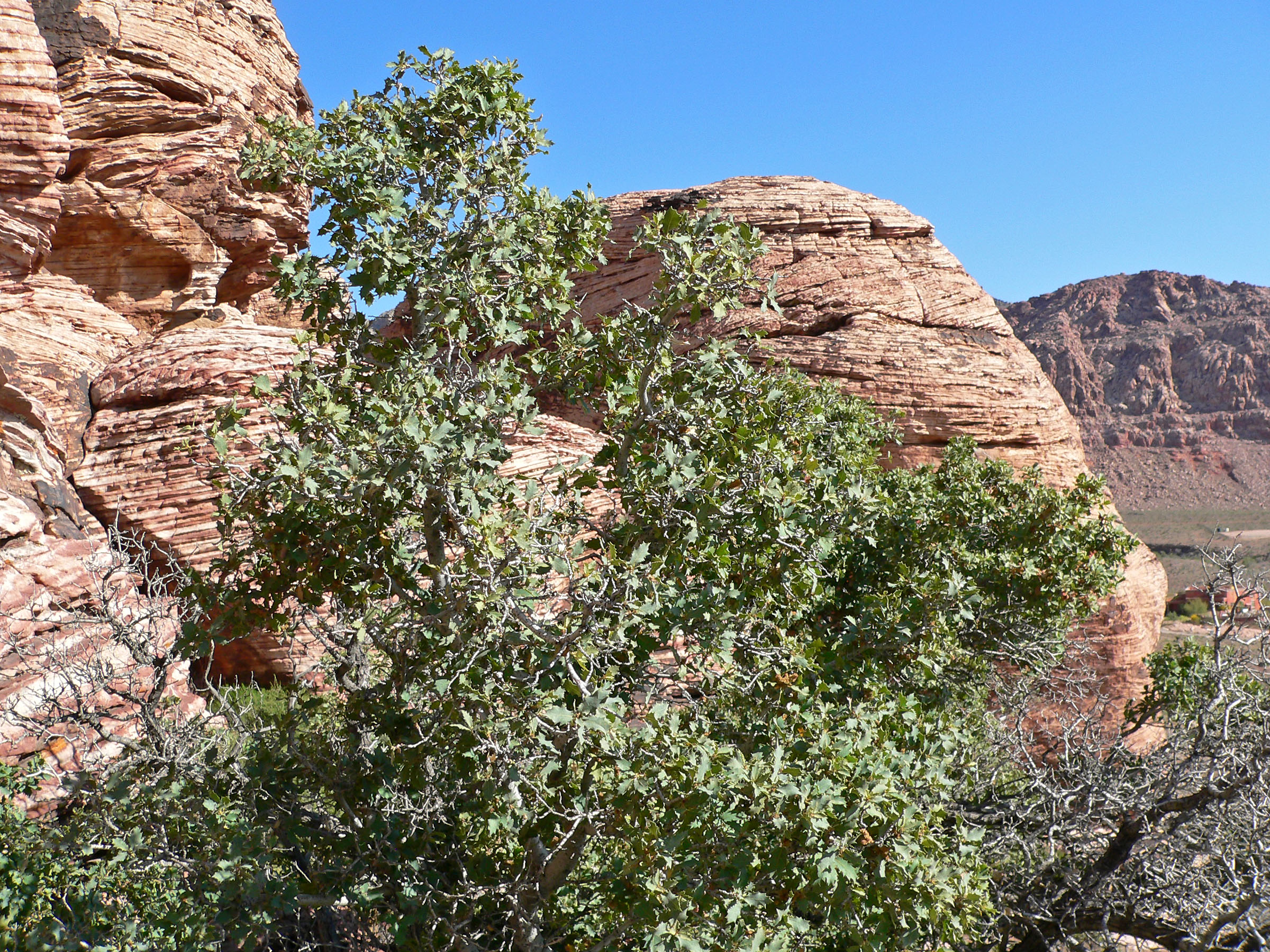
Tree in the desert

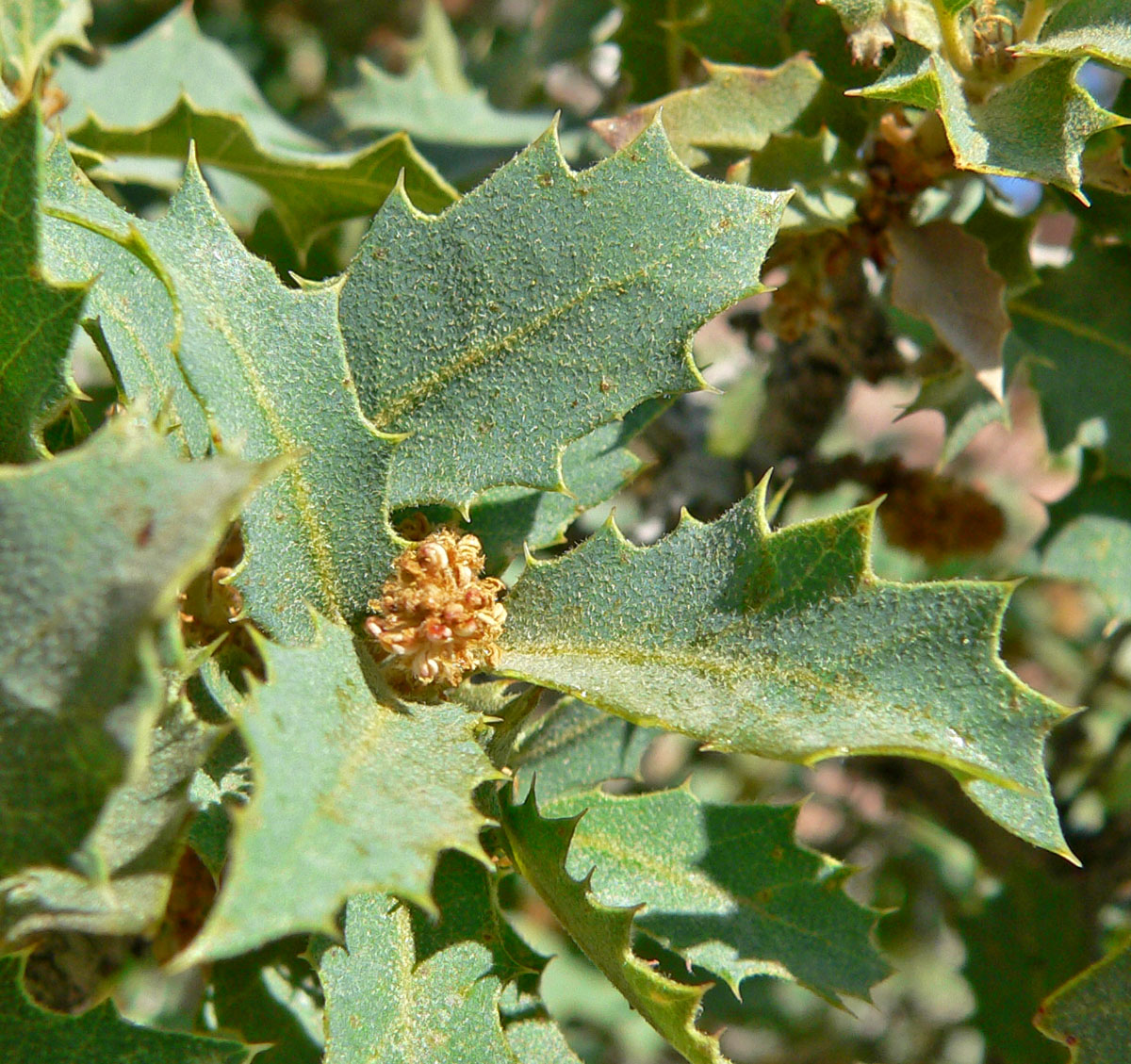
Detail of leaf and flower

== See also ==
- Quercus × alvordiana
