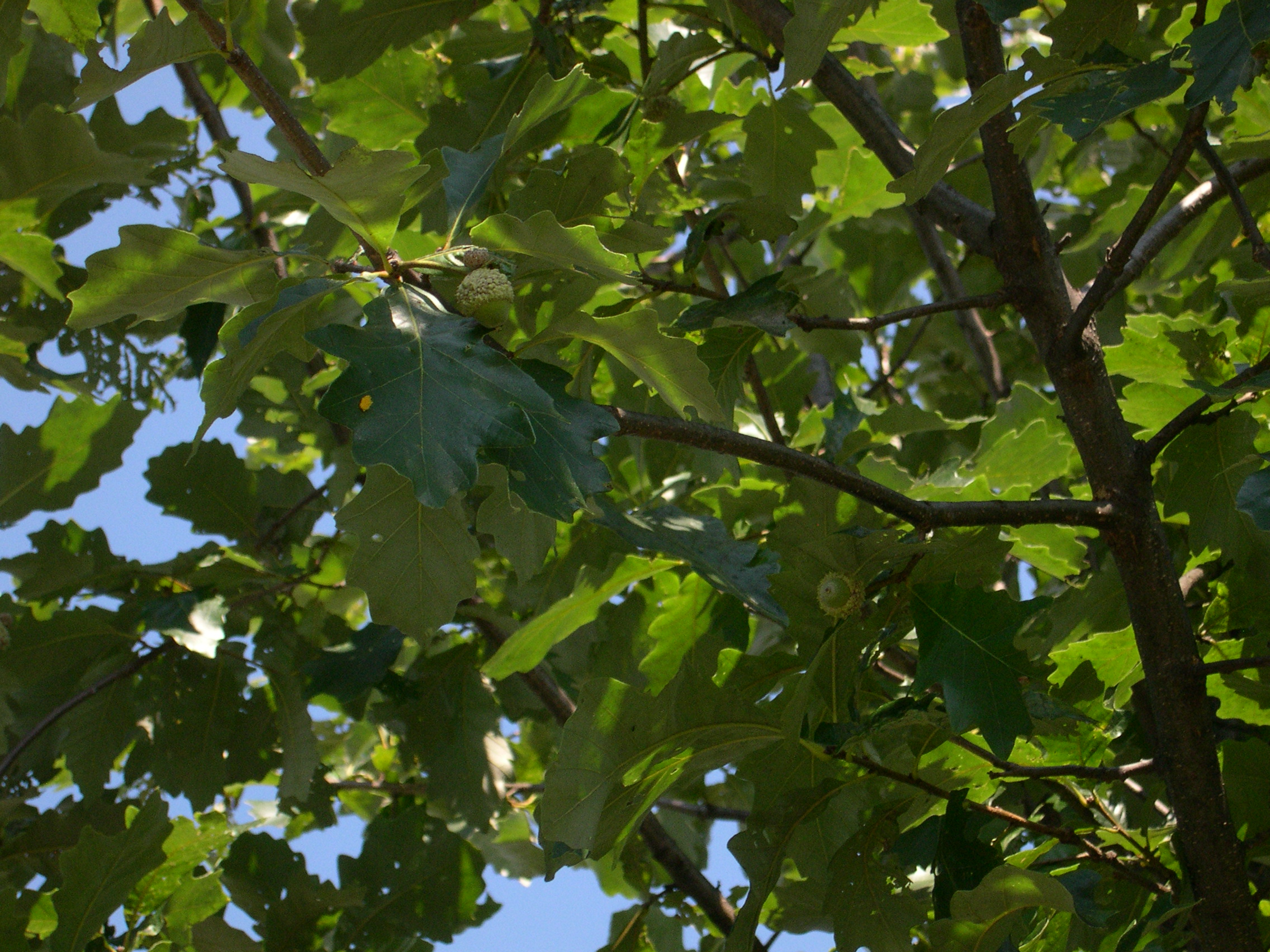
- Foliage and ripening acorns of Quercus sinuata var. sinuata

Conservation status
- Least Concern (IUCN 3.1)

Scientific classification
- Kingdom: Plantae
- Clade: Embryophytes
- Clade: Tracheophytes
- Clade: Spermatophytes
- Clade: Angiosperms
- Clade: Eudicots
- Clade: Rosids
- Order: Fagales
- Family: Fagaceae
- Genus: Quercus
- Subgenus: Quercus subg. Quercus
- Section: Quercus sect. Quercus
- Species: Q. sinuata

Binomial name
- Quercus sinuata Walter
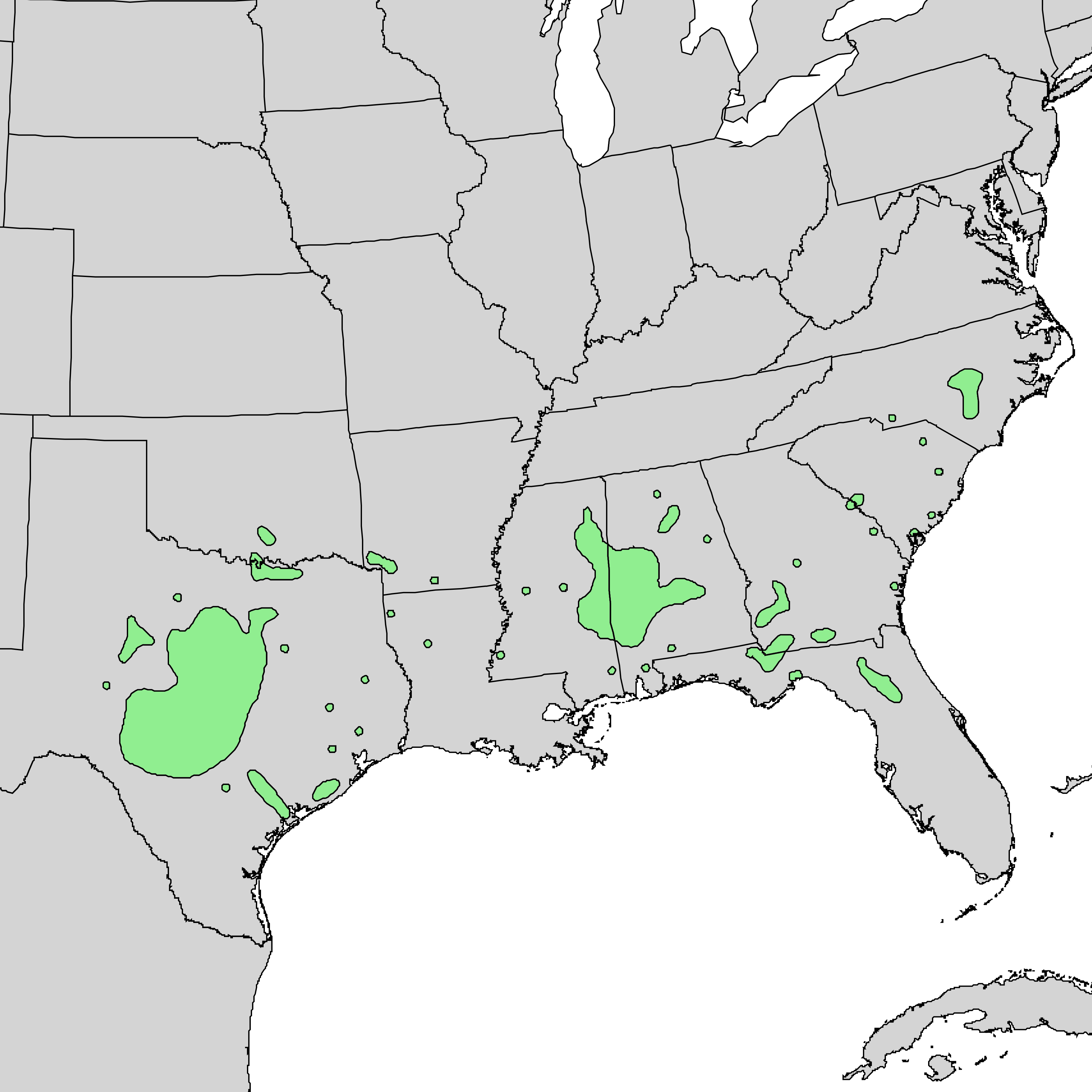
- Natural range of Quercus sinuata

Synonyms
- List: Quercus durandii Buckley; Quercus emoryi Porter & Coult.; Quercus pagoda f. sinuata (Walter) Trel.; Quercus sinuata f. durandii (Buckley) Trel.; Quercus undulata Engelm.; Quercus undulata var. grandifolia Engelm.; Perytis annulata Raf.; Quercus annulata Buckley; Quercus breviloba (Torr.) Sarg.; Quercus breviloba f. argentata Trel.; Quercus breviloba subsp. pseudocrispata (A.Camus) A.Camus; Quercus breviloba f. san-sabeana (Buckley) Buckley; Quercus durandii var. breviloba (Torr.) E.J.Palmer; Quercus durandii var. san-sabeana (Buckley) Buckley; Quercus obtusifolia var. breviloba Torr.; Quercus pseudocrispata A.Camus; Quercus san-sabeana Buckley; Quercus sinuata subsp. breviloba (Torr.) A.E.Murray; Quercus undulata var. breviloba (Torr.) Engelm.

= Quercus sinuata =

Species of oak tree

Quercus sinuata is a species of oak comprising two distinct varieties, Quercus sinuata var. breviloba and Quercus sinuata var. sinuata, occurring in southeast North America.

== Description ==
Quercus sinuata is a deciduous tree up to 20 metres (67 feet) tall. Leaves are narrow, with shallow rounded lobes. It tends to grow in wet habitats, such as on river bluffs, river bottoms, and flatwoods, and generally over basic substrates, such as mafic rocks, shells, or calcareous sediment.

There are two varieties, with morphologically intermediate forms sometimes occurring where their ranges overlap:

- Quercus sinuata var. breviloba (Torr.) C.H.Mull. – Texas, Oklahoma, Mexico
- Quercus sinuata var. sinuata – Alabama, Arkansas, Florida, Georgia, Louisiana, Mississippi, Carolinas, Texas

== Common names ==
Perhaps arising from the classification challenges posed by a lack of morphological consistency among individuals of the species, the common name bastard oak may refer to either var. sinuata or var. breviloba or to any of their intermediate forms. The common names Durand oak and Durand white oak most often refer to Quercus sinuata var. sinuata. Other common names for Quercus sinuata var. sinuata include bastard white oak and bluff oak, but these names more often refer to Quercus austrina. Common names for Quercus sinuata var. breviloba are Bigelow oak, Bigelow's oak, shallow-lobed oak, white shin oak, scaly-bark oak, limestone Durand oak, and shortlobe oak. Other common names include scrub oak or shin oak, but these names may refer to a number of other low growing, clump forming oak species, subspecies or varieties. For clear differentiation in common reference, American Forests uses Durand Oak to mean Quercus sinuata var. sinuata and Bigelow oak to mean Quercus sinuata var. breviloba, a shrubby variety of Quercus sinuata distinguished in part by its habit of forming clonal colonies in parts of its range.

== Distribution and habitat ==
Quercus sinuata var. breviloba is native to central and north central Texas, south central and southwest Oklahoma, and to Coahuila, Nuevo León, and Tamaulipas in northern Mexico. Quercus sinuata var. sinuata is native to the south-central and southeastern United States from central Texas and southwestern Arkansas to the Carolinas. Their respective ranges intersect in the Hill Country of central Texas, where streams flowing through dry, brushy limestone hills create a mosaic of wet and well drained habitats.
