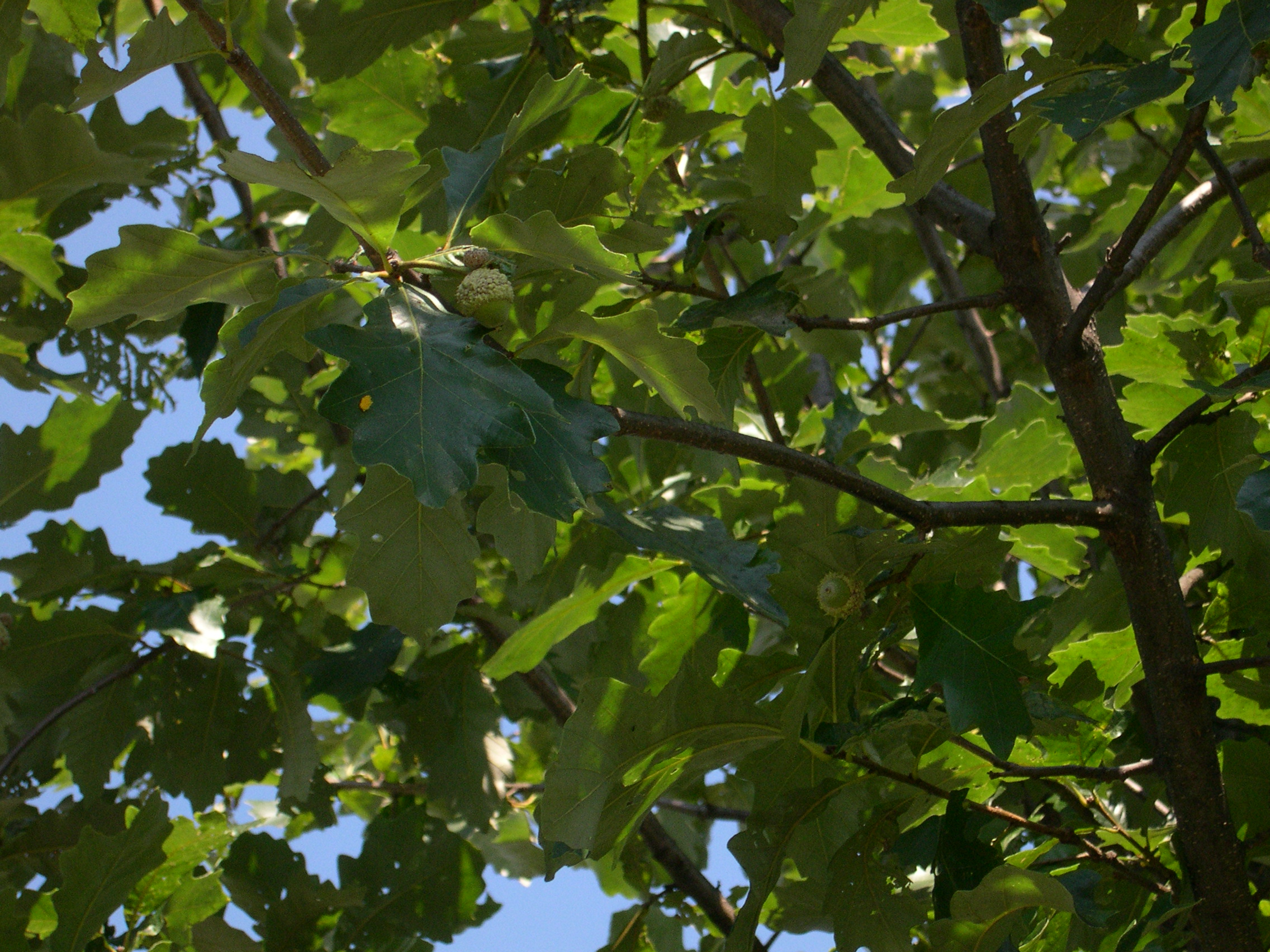
- Foliage and ripening acorns of Quercus sinuata var. sinuata, commonly called Durand oak.

Scientific classification
- Kingdom: Plantae
- Clade: Tracheophytes
- Clade: Angiosperms
- Clade: Eudicots
- Clade: Rosids
- Order: Fagales
- Family: Fagaceae
- Genus: Quercus
- Species: Q. sinuata Walt.
- Variety: Q. s. var. sinuata

Trinomial name
- Quercus sinuata var. sinuata
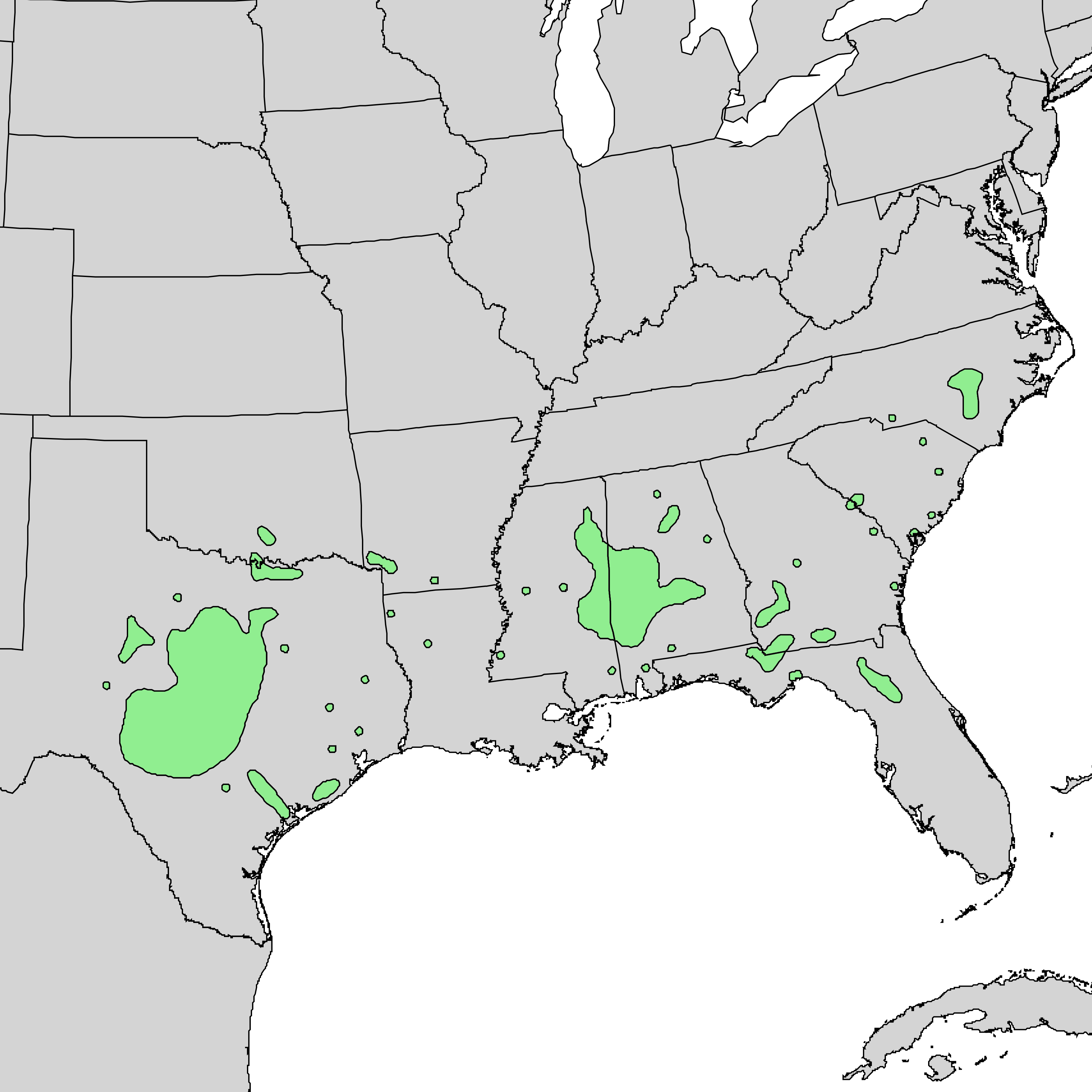
- Combined natural ranges of Quercus sinuata var. sinuata and Quercus sinuata var. breviloba.

= Quercus sinuata var. sinuata =

Durand oak

Variety of a species of oak tree

Quercus sinuata var. sinuata, commonly called Durand oak, is a variety of Quercus sinuata, a species of oak tree that grows in parts of the southern United States and northeastern Mexico.

The common name Durand white oak most often refers to this taxon. The less specific common name bastard oak may refer to either of the two varieties of Quercus sinuata, var. sinuata and var. breviloba. Other common names include bastard white oak and bluff oak, but these names more often refer to Quercus austrina. For clear differentiation in common reference, American Forests uses bluff oak to mean Quercus Austrina, Durand oak to mean Quercus sinuata var. sinuata and Bigelow oak to mean Quercus sinuata var. breviloba, a shrubby variety of Quercus sinuata distinguished in part from var. sinuata by its habit of forming clonal colonies in parts of its range.

== Description ==
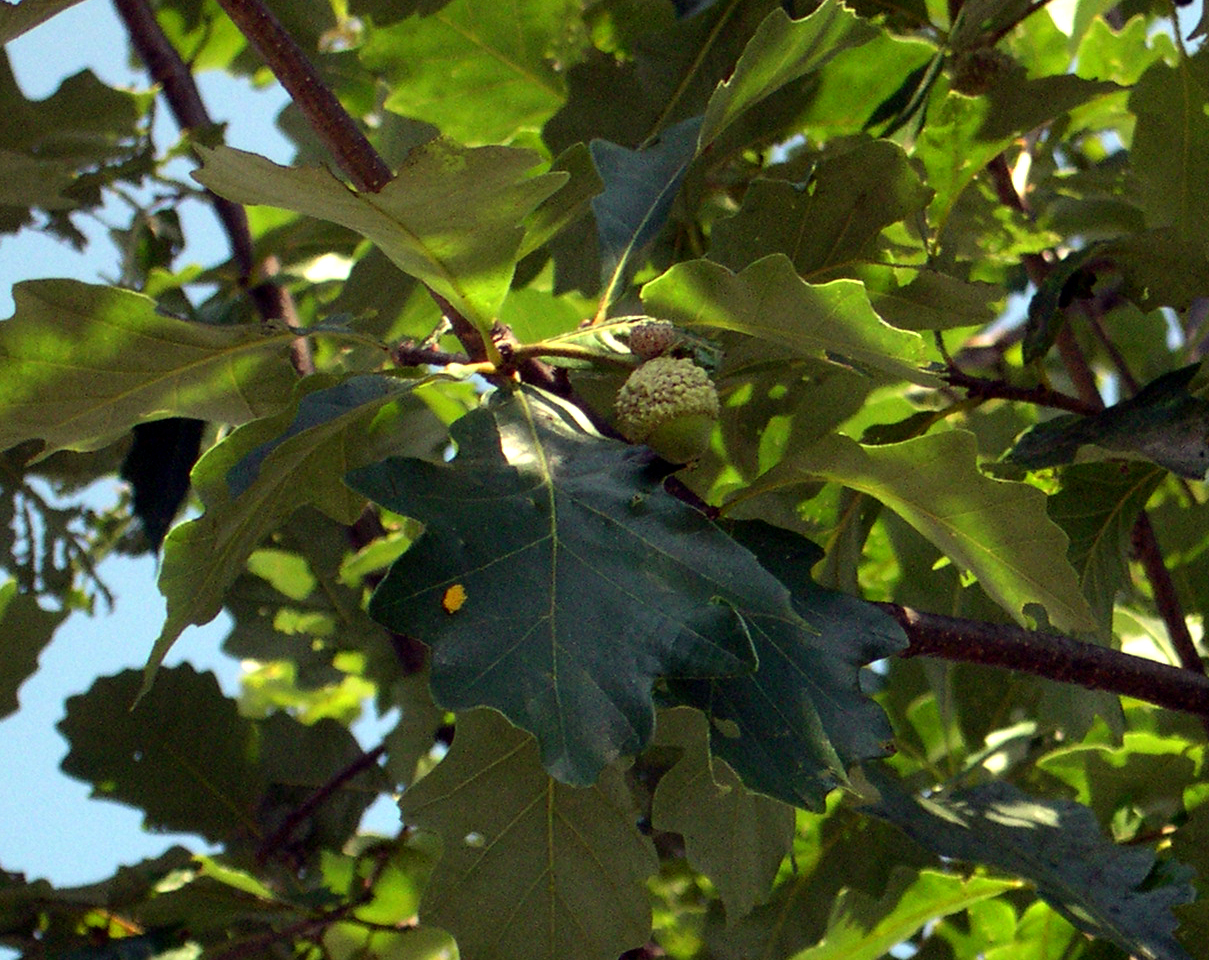
Ripening acorns

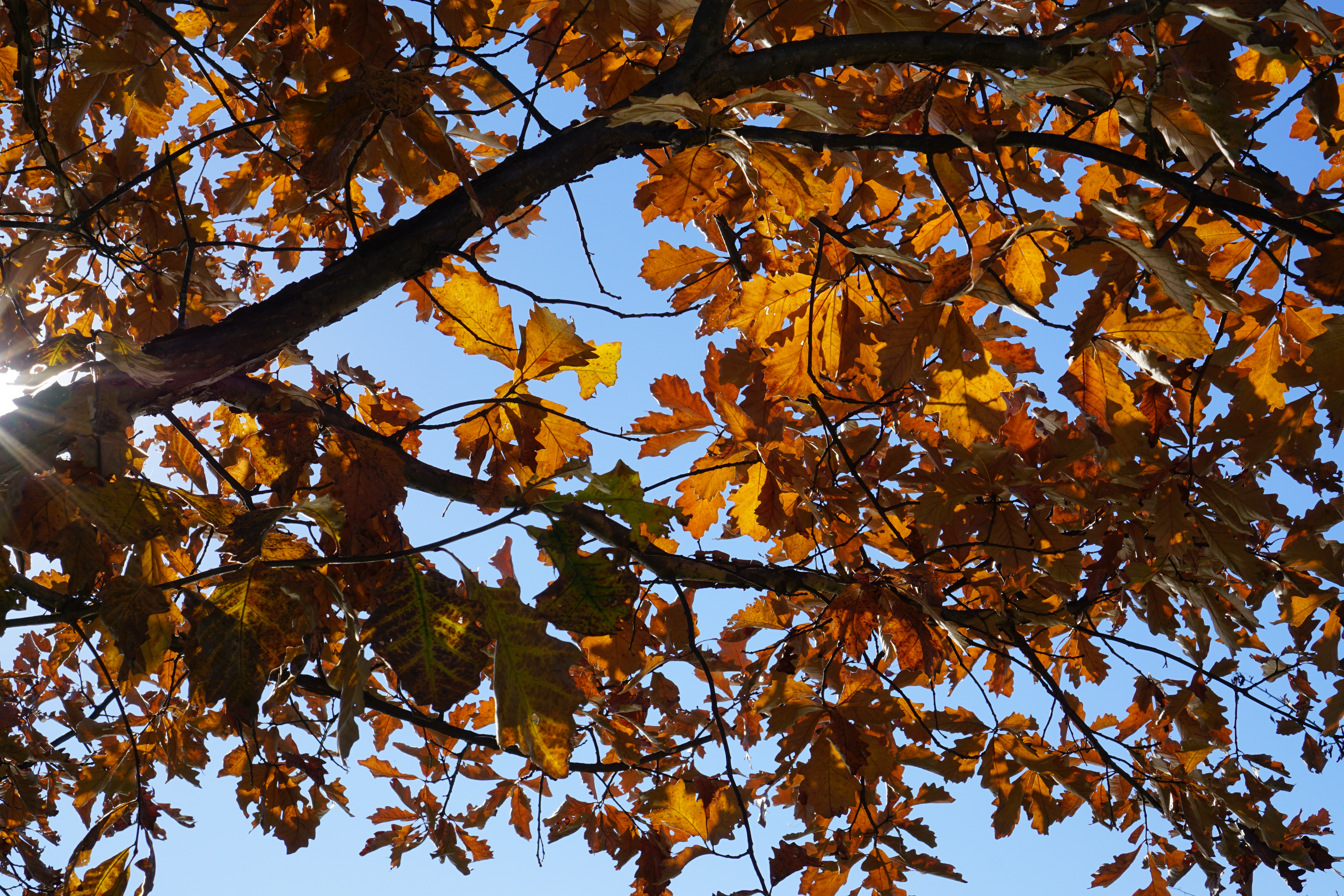
Sunlight through autumn foliage

=== Historical description ===
Quercus sinuata 12. foliis sinuatis laevibus obtusis supra pallidis, subtus subglaucis, glandibus mediocribus globosis calyce subplano.

Quercus sinuata 12. Smooth, sinuate leaves, broadly rounded or blunt at the tip, pale above and almost blue-green with a whitish bloom on the underside, acorns moderately spherical with almost flat cupules.

== Taxonomy ==
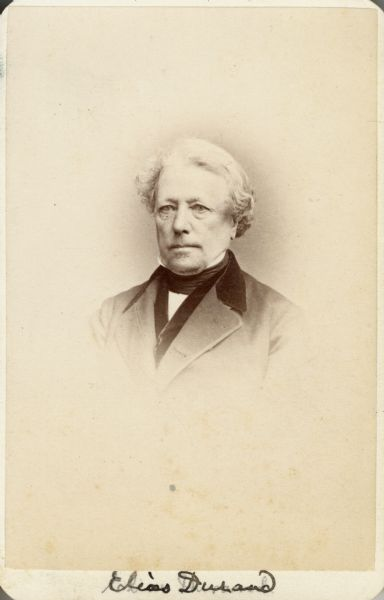
Elias Durand, Philadelphia botanist after whom Durand oak is named

Synonymous names for this taxon include Quercus durandii Buckley (1861) and Quercus undulata Engelm. (1878). Because it was given by Samuel Botsford Buckley to name some taxons he believed to be varieties but are now understood to be separate species, the term "durandii" is currently regarded as "nomen confusum." The honorary association with Elias Magloire Durand is preserved in the most widely accepted common name for this taxon, "Durand oak."

Quercus sinuata, first described by Thomas Walter in Flora Caroliniana in 1788, claims no subspecies and only two varieties, var. sinuata and var. breviloba.

=== Etymology ===
Quercus sinuata var. sinuata (Latin quercus, "oak" + sinuata, species epithet from nominative feminine singular of Latin sinuatus, participle of sinuo, "to bend or bow out in curves" + var. (variety or varietas) sinuata, to distinguish this taxon from the generally more shallowly lobed variety of this species, var. breviloba) is an infraspecific scientific name inspired by the wavy leaf margins characteristic of the taxon.

The common English word "oak," designating a shrub or tree of the genus Quercus, descends from the Proto-Germanic *eiks through the Old English ac, "oak tree," and the Middle English oke. "Durand" honors Philadelphia botanist Elias Durand.

== Distribution ==
The Durand oak grows in low, wet areas of Alabama, Arkansas, Florida, Georgia, Louisiana, Mississippi, North Carolina, South Carolina and Texas in the southern United States.

== National champion ==
The largest known Durand oak in the United States appeared on the National Register of Champion Trees in 2020. Located in Greene County, Alabama, the national champion specimen of Quercus sinuata var. sinuata was nominated in 2020 by Steve Gardiner and crowned on September 27, 2020, when it was last measured. By that time, the champion tree had attained a trunk circumference of 4.6 metres (180 inches), a height of 27 m (90 feet) and a crown spread of 29 m (95 ft). The American Forests formula for assigning point scores to nominated trees, Trunk Circumference (in inches) + Height (in feet) + 1/4 Average Crown Spread (in feet), resulted in an overall score of 294 points.
