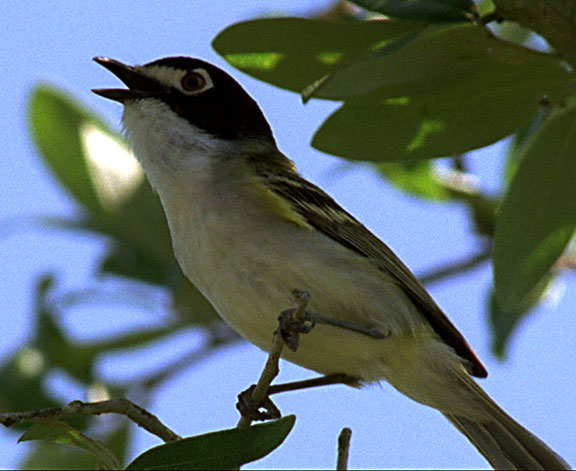

Conservation status
- Near Threatened (IUCN 3.1)

- Vulnerable (NatureServe)

Scientific classification
- Kingdom: Animalia
- Phylum: Chordata
- Class: Aves
- Order: Passeriformes
- Family: Vireonidae
- Genus: Vireo
- Species: V. atricapilla

Binomial name
- Vireo atricapilla Woodhouse, 1852

Synonyms
- Vireo atricapillus Woodhouse, 1852

= Black-capped vireo =

Species of bird

The black-capped vireo (Vireo atricapilla) is a small bird native to the United States and Mexico. It was listed as an endangered species in the United States in 1987. It is the only Vireo that is sexually dichromatic. Recovery of the species' population contributed to its delisting in 2018. The IUCN lists the species as "near threatened."

== Description ==
The black-capped vireo is a songbird about 12 cm (4.5 inches ) in length. Sexually mature males are olive green above and white below with faint yellow flanks. The crown and upper half of the head is black with a partial white eye ring and lores. The iris is brownish-red and the bill is black. Females are duller in color than males and have a slate-gray crown and underparts washed with greenish yellow. First-year males often have more extensive gray in the cap, similar to adult females.

== Nesting ==
The male and female in a pair assist in nest construction and incubation. Typically, the female lays three or four eggs. The incubation period is 14 to 17 days, and the nestling period is 10 to 12 days. The female broods over the young, while the male supplies most of the food during the nestling phase. Breeding pairs are capable of producing more than one clutch per breeding season. The male cares for some or all of the fledglings, while the female nests again, sometimes with another male. These birds are insectivorous, with beetles and caterpillars making up a large part of their diet.

Black-capped vireos nest in "shinneries", brushy areas with scattered trees. Shinneries primarily consist of shin oak or sumac. Appropriate height and density are important factors for this species' breeding success. Foliage that extends to ground level is the most important requirement for nesting. Most nests are between 15 and 50 in (35–125 cm) above ground level, and are screened from view by foliage. Territories are sometimes located on steep slopes, where trees are often clumped and intermediate in height. On level terrain, the preferred black-capped vireo habitat is a mixture of shrubs and smaller trees that average from 8–10 ft high (2.5-3.5 m). Black-capped vireos stop using sites where many trees are nearing full size.

== Distribution ==
The historic breeding distribution of the black-capped vireo extended south from south-central Kansas through central Oklahoma and Texas to central Coahuila, Mexico. At present, the range extends from Oklahoma south through the Edwards Plateau and Big Bend National Park, Texas, to at least the Sierra Madera in central Coahuila, and south to southwestern Tamaulipas. In Oklahoma, the black-capped vireo is found only in Blaine, Cleveland, Cotton and Comanche Counties. It winters along the west coast of Mexico from southern Sonora to Guerrero.

== Conservation ==
The black-capped vireo is threatened by brown-headed cowbird (Molothrus ater) brood parasitism, human disturbance, loss of habitat to urbanization, fire exclusion, livestock grazing, and brush control. The species was listed as an Endangered Species on 6 October 1987, "due to such factors as urbanization, grazing, range improvement, and succession."

With a declining total population size between 10,000 and 19,999, the species continues to be managed by the Texas Parks and Wildlife Department and the Oklahoma Department of Conservation.

Conservation efforts on the U.S. Army's Fort Cavazos and Fort Sill helped contribute to its delisting from the endangered species list.

== See also ==
- Balcones Canyonlands National Wildlife Refuge
