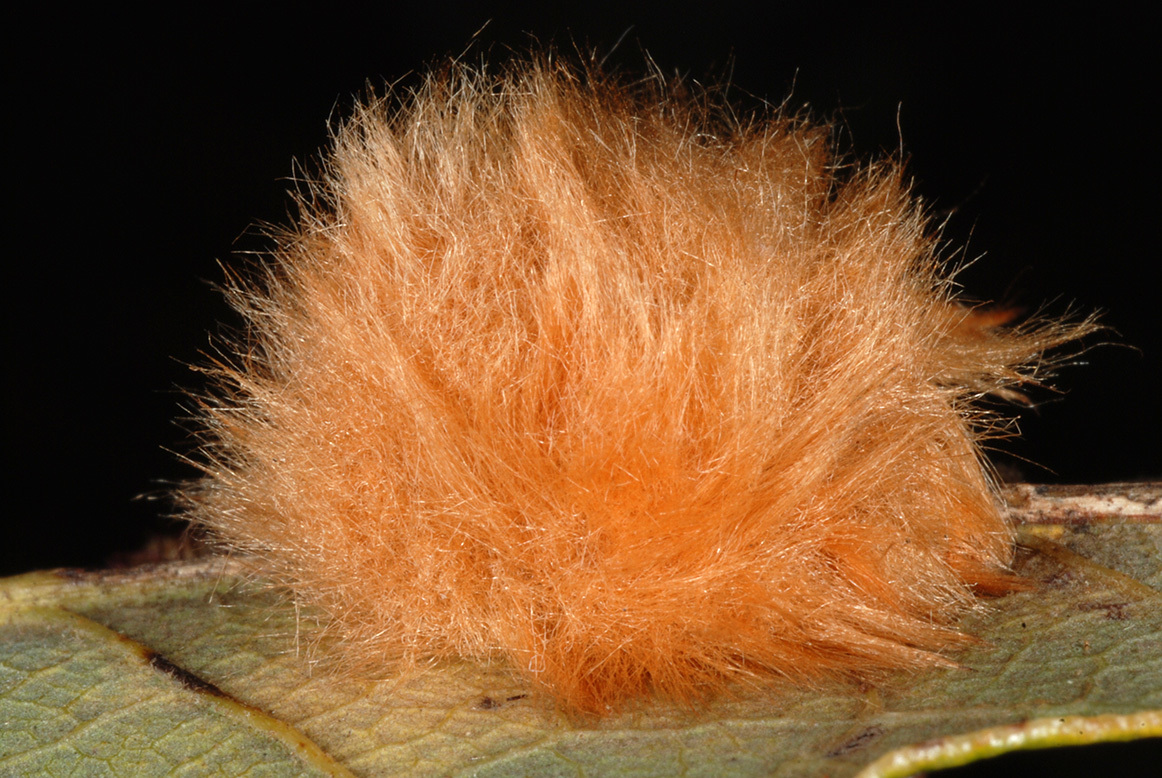
- asexual gall

Scientific classification
- Domain: Eukaryota
- Kingdom: Animalia
- Phylum: Arthropoda
- Class: Insecta
- Order: Hymenoptera
- Family: Cynipidae
- Genus: Druon
- Species: D. pattoni

Binomial name
- Druon pattoni Bassett, 1881

Synonyms
- Cynips pattoni Bassett, 1881; Andricus pattoni Weld, 1952

= Druon pattoni =

Species of wasp

Druon pattoni is a species of gall wasp in the family Cynipidae, found in the United States. It forms galls on Quercus chapmanii and Quercus stellata, as well as tentatively on Quercus margarettae and Quercus sinuata var. breviloba. Only the asexual generation is known, which develop in leaf galls that mature in October to November, after which the adults begin to emerge.
