= Druon =

Druon may refer to:

- Druon (wasp), a genus of cynipid wasps
- Druon Antigoon, Flemish folkloric character
- Loïc Druon, French footballer
- Maurice Druon, French novelist
- Saint Drogo, also known as Saint Druon, Flemish saint
