= John Aston Warder =

Physician and founder

John Aston Warder (January 19, 1812 – July 14, 1883) was a medical doctor, influential leader in the fields of horticulture and forestry, and founder of the American Forestry Association. He was among the first to propose the planting of belts of trees on the great western plains.

He died at the John Aston Warder House in North Bend, Ohio in 1883.

== External resources ==
- "January 19, 1812: John Aston Warder, Founder of the American Forestry Association, is Born". Peeling Back the Bark, the Forest History Society.
