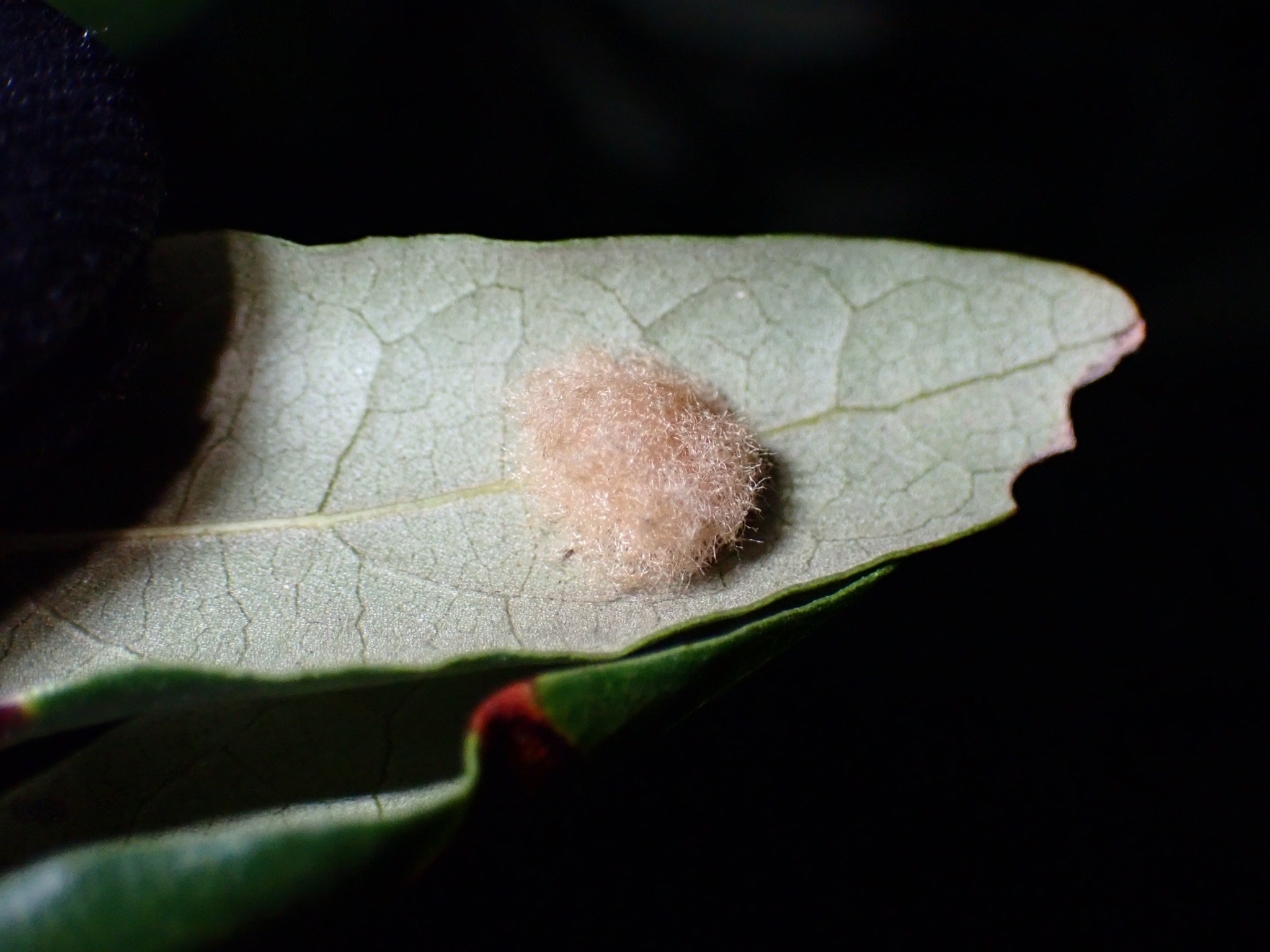
- Asexual gall of Druon quercuslanigerum on Quercus virginiana
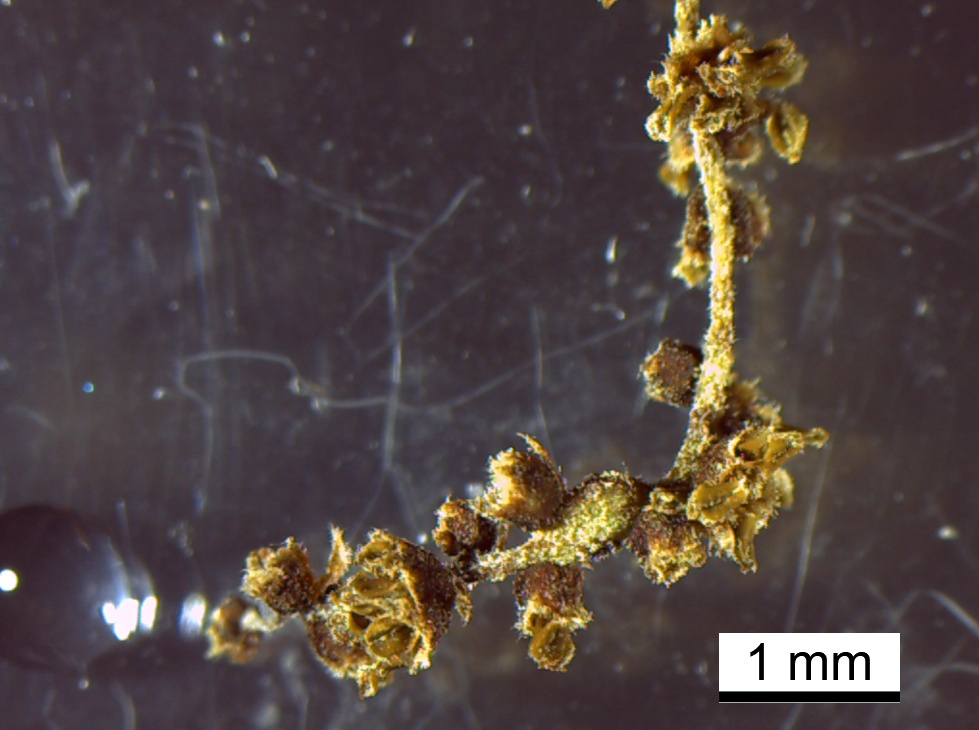
- Sexual gall of Druon quercuslanigerum on Quercus virginiana catkin

Scientific classification
- Kingdom: Animalia
- Phylum: Arthropoda
- Clade: Pancrustacea
- Class: Insecta
- Order: Hymenoptera
- Family: Cynipidae
- Genus: Druon
- Species: D. quercuslanigerum

Binomial name
- Druon quercuslanigerum (Ashmead, 1881)

Synonyms
- Cynips lanigera Ashmead, 1881; Andricus lanigera Ashmead, 1885; Andricus laniger Weld, 1951; Andricus quercuslanigera Burks, 1979

= Druon quercuslanigerum =

Species of gall wasp

Druon quercuslanigerum is a species of gall wasp that forms galls on Quercus virginiana, Quercus geminata, Quercus fusiformis, and Quercus oleoides. There are both asexual and sexual generations. The asexual generation forms galls on the leaves, whereas the sexual generation forms galls on the catkins. It can be found in the southern United States and Mexico. Predators of this species include the green parakeet.

== Taxonomy ==
Druon quercuslanigerum was first described in 1881 by William Harris Ashmead as part of the genus Cynips but moved the species to the genus Andricus four years later. In 2022, it was moved to the re-established genus Druon.

== Description ==
The asexual generation gall consists of an inner capsule of mature galls with a woolly covering, typically appearing on the underside of leaves along the mid-vein. A mature gall measures 1.0–7.0 mm in diameter and 2–3 mm high. The woolly covering varies from creamy white to yellowish-white when older, and the inner capsule is light brown. The galls can appear singly or in clusters of three to six galls.

The sexual generation galls form on catkins in the spring. They appear as a small (~1 mm) ovate swelling of the central stem of the catkin.

The asexual generation female is reddish-brown and measures 2-2.5 mm, while the smaller sexual female is dark-red-brown to black and measures 1.4-2.1 mm in length. The sexual male generation, similar in coloration to the female, measures 1.2–1.6 mm in length.

== Life history ==
Upon emerging from catkin galls in mid-March to early April, the sexual generation mates and lays eggs in the mid-rib of new leaves. The woolly galls develop from mid to late summer through the fall and winter, with asexual females emerging from September through February. This emergence period coincides with catkin bud production, where the asexual females lay their eggs. The emergence period of the asexual generation is approximately ten times longer than that of the sexual generation.

== Gallery ==
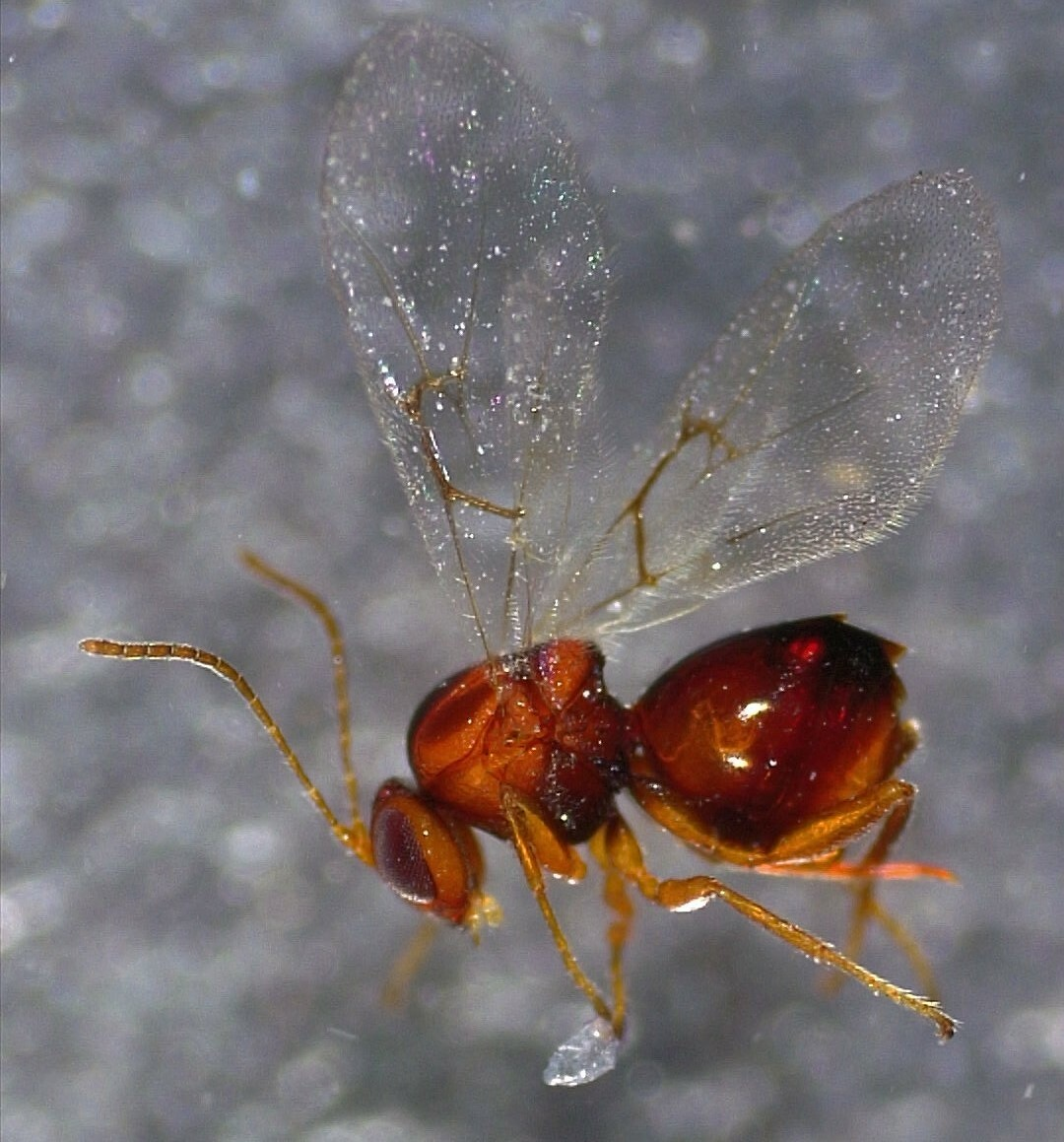
Druon quercuslanigerum asexual female

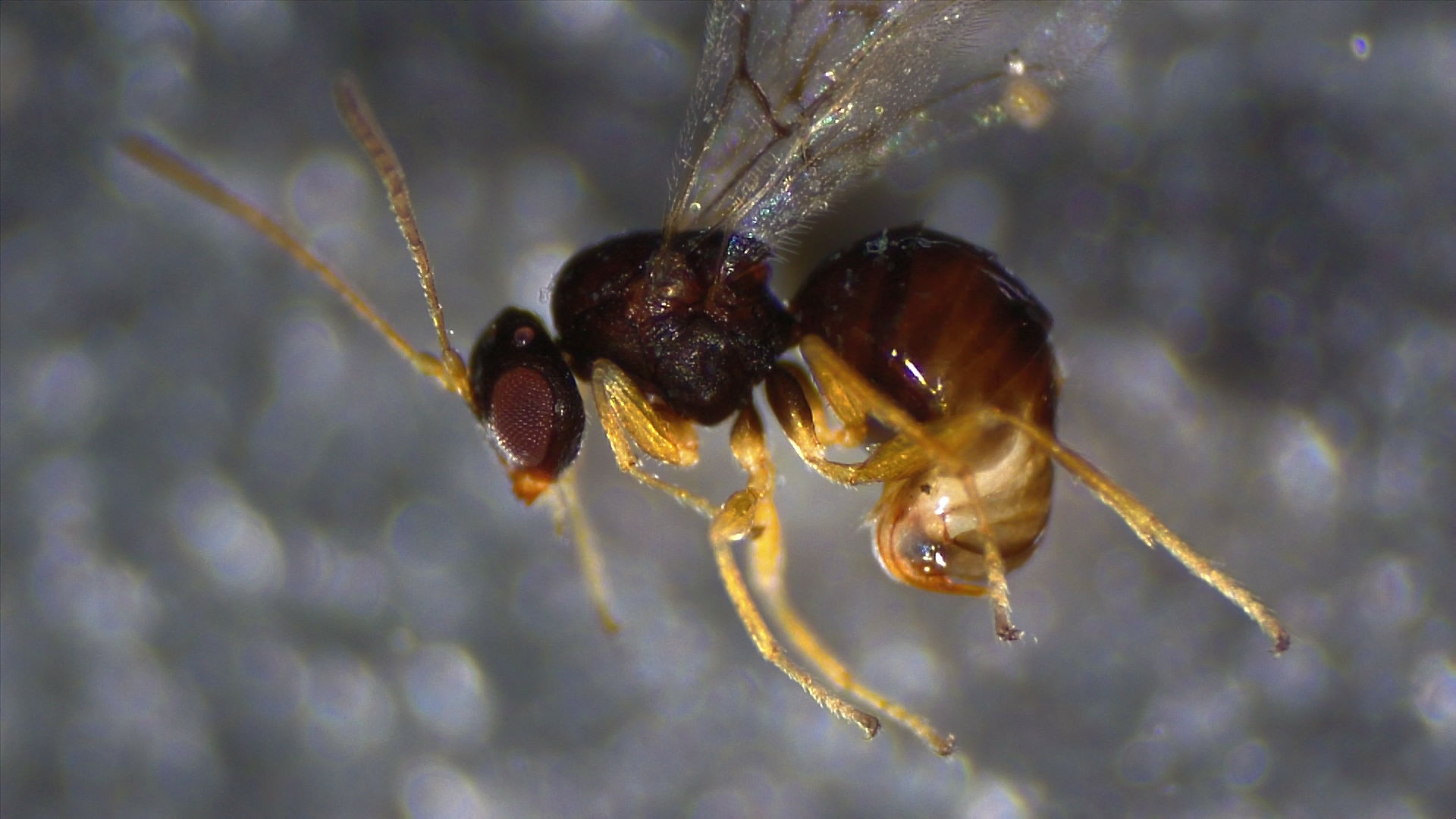
Druon quercuslanigerum sexual female

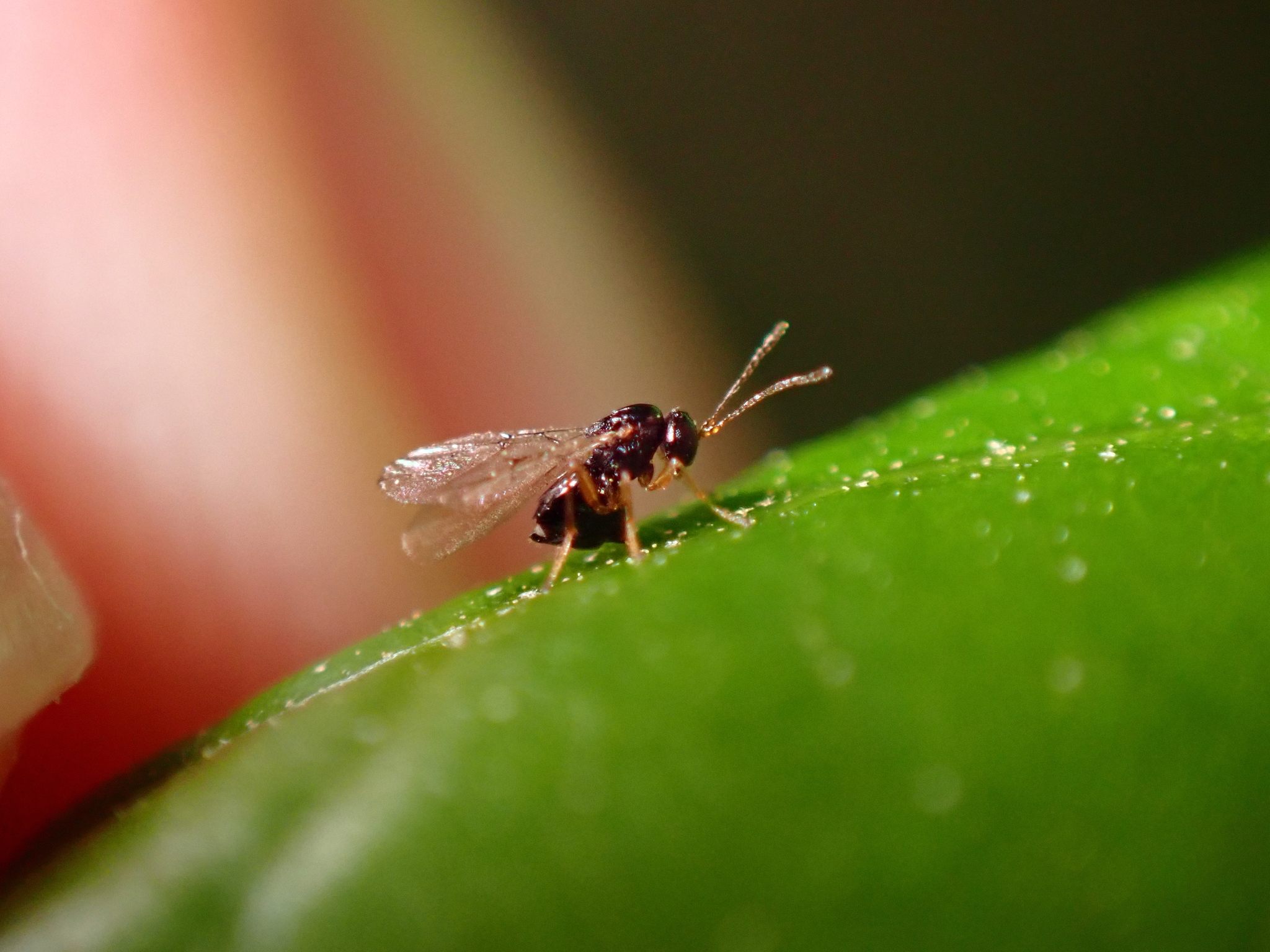
Druon quercuslanigerum sexual female ovipositing into a leaf mid-rib
