= John Aston Warder House =

Historic house in Ohio, United States

- U.S. National Register of Historic Places
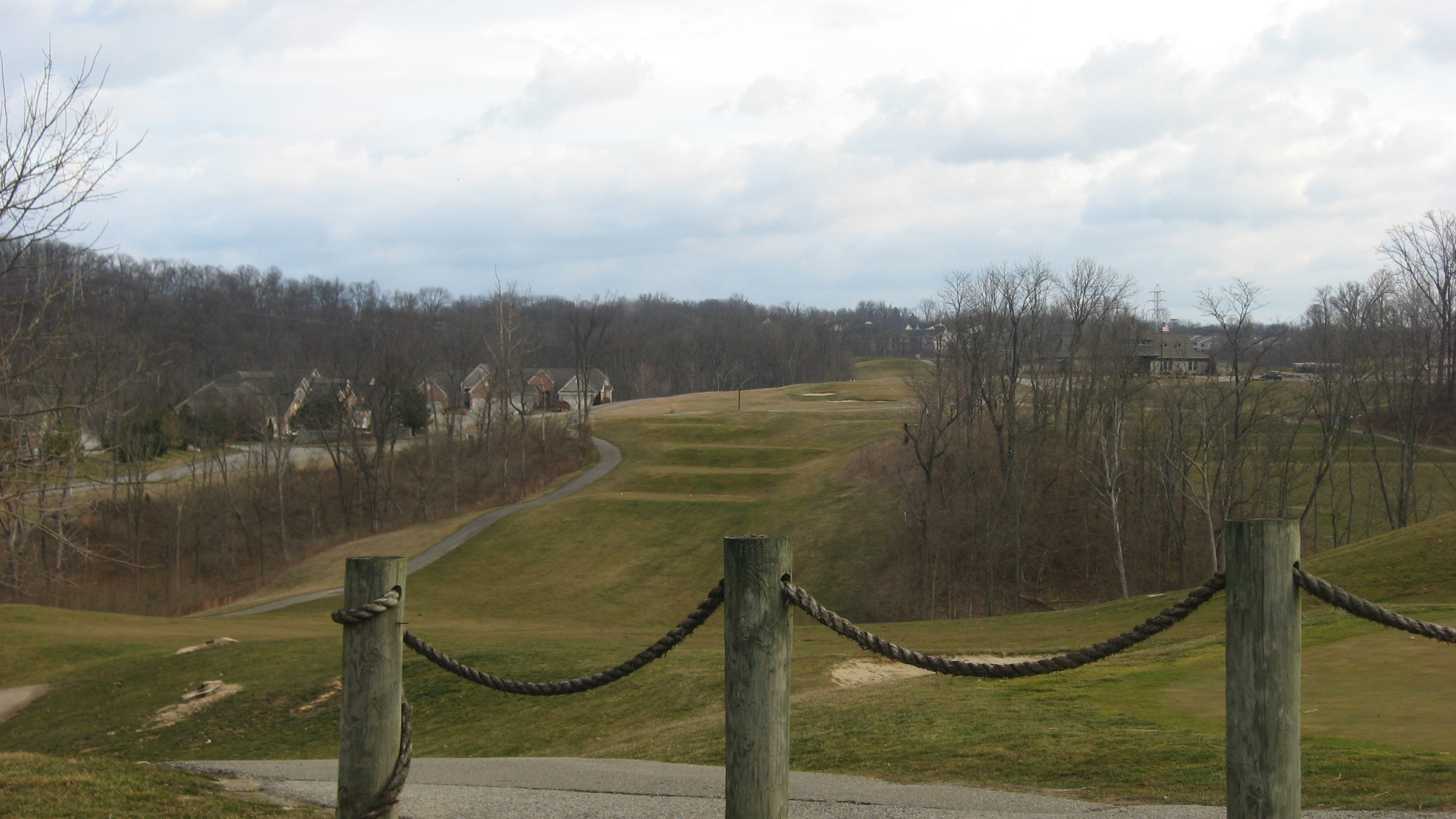
- A golf course on the house's grounds, which contribute to the listing
- Nearest city: North Bend, Ohio
- Coordinates: 39°8′57″N 84°43′41″W
- Architect: John Aston Warder
- NRHP reference No.: 78002084
- Added to NRHP: May 19, 1978

John Aston Warder House is a registered historic building near North Bend, Ohio, listed in the National Register on May 19, 1978.

The mansion served as the homestead of John Aston Warder, who is regarded as the "father of American forestry".
