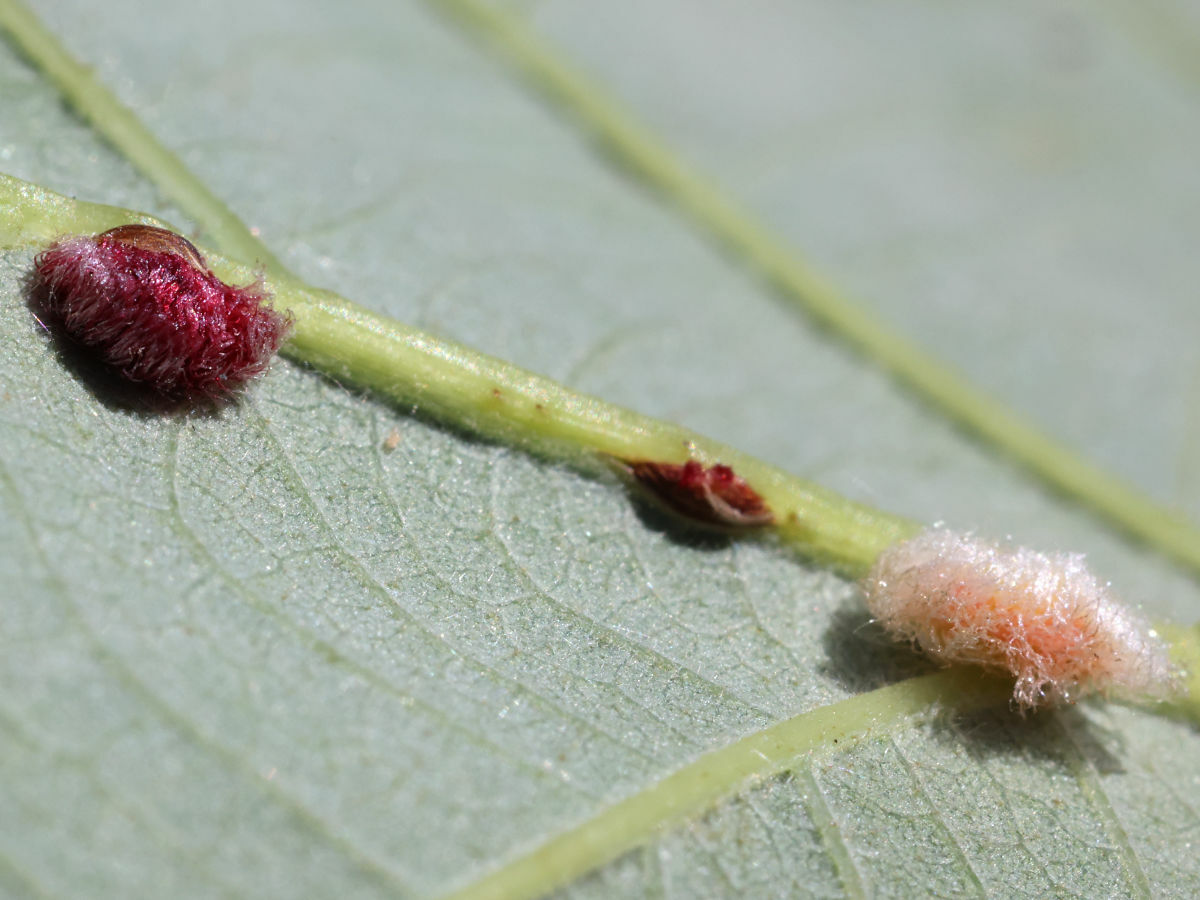
- Galls on bur oak

Scientific classification
- Kingdom: Animalia
- Phylum: Arthropoda
- Clade: Pancrustacea
- Class: Insecta
- Order: Hymenoptera
- Family: Cynipidae
- Genus: Druon
- Species: D. ignotum

Binomial name
- Druon ignotum (Bassett, 1881)

Synonyms
- Cynips ignota Bassett, 1881; Andricus ignota (Bassett, 1881); Dryophanta ignota (Bassett, 1881); Diplolepis ignota (Bassett, 1881); Rhodites ignota (Bassett, 1881); Andricus ignotus (Bassett, 1881)

= Druon ignotum =

Species of wasp

Druon ignotum is a species of gall wasp in the family Cynipidae.

== Ecology and Life History ==
This species is widely distributed in central and eastern North America. Larvae induce galls on white oaks, including bur oak, swamp white oak, overcup oak, and post oak.

Like many oak gall wasps, this species has two generations per year - one asexual (or agamic) and one sexual, with each generation producing distinct galls. Galls of the agamic generation are small, ovoid, and occur in clusters along veins on the underside of leaves. They are covered by woolly cream- or pink-colored hair that becomes brown over the winter and sometimes wears away. Females emerge from these galls early in spring and oviposit in the buds of host oak trees. This induces the galls of the sexual generation, which are small ovoid cells within buds and young shoots; they cause little or no externally visible deformity. Both male and female adult wasps emerge from these galls and mate, with mated females then ovipositing on the underside of oak leaves, inducing the galls of the agamic generation.

== Taxonomy ==
This species was first described by Homer Franklin Bassett as Cynips ignota in 1881 and has been included in various genera before its recent placement in Druon.
