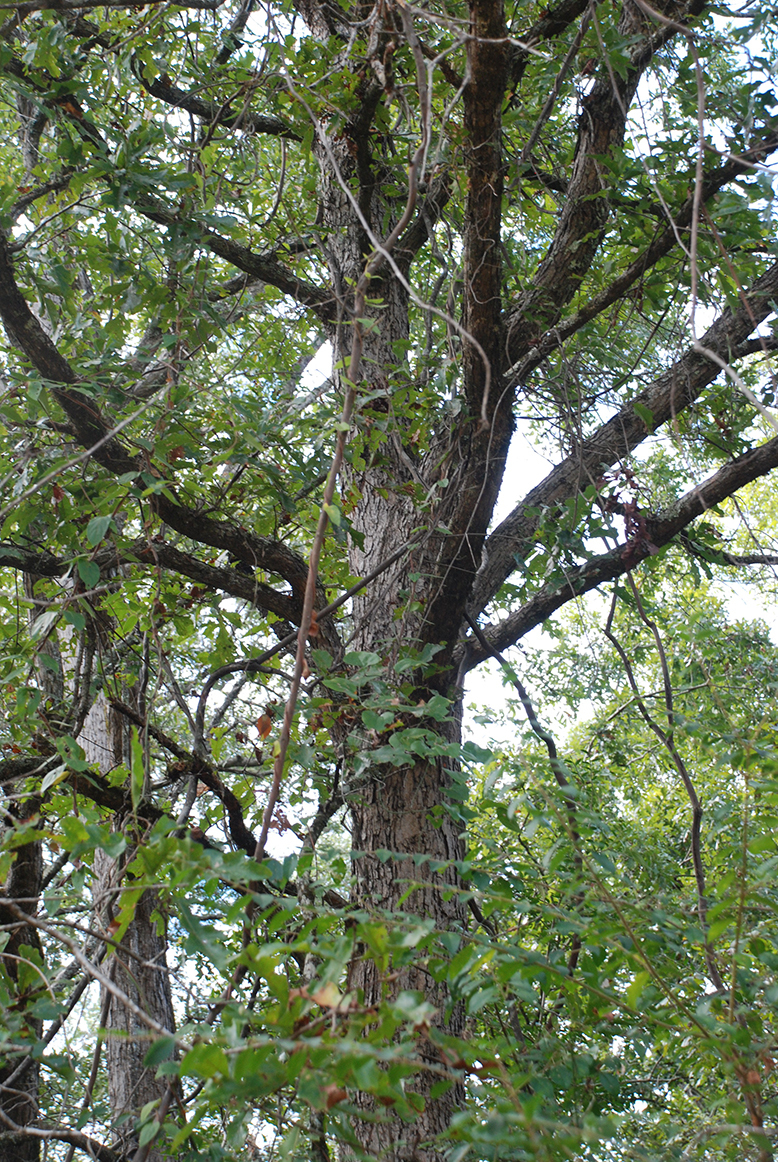

Conservation status
- Vulnerable (IUCN 3.1)

Scientific classification
- Kingdom: Plantae
- Clade: Embryophytes
- Clade: Tracheophytes
- Clade: Spermatophytes
- Clade: Angiosperms
- Clade: Eudicots
- Clade: Rosids
- Order: Fagales
- Family: Fagaceae
- Genus: Quercus
- Subgenus: Quercus subg. Quercus
- Section: Quercus sect. Quercus
- Species: Q. austrina

Binomial name
- Quercus austrina Small
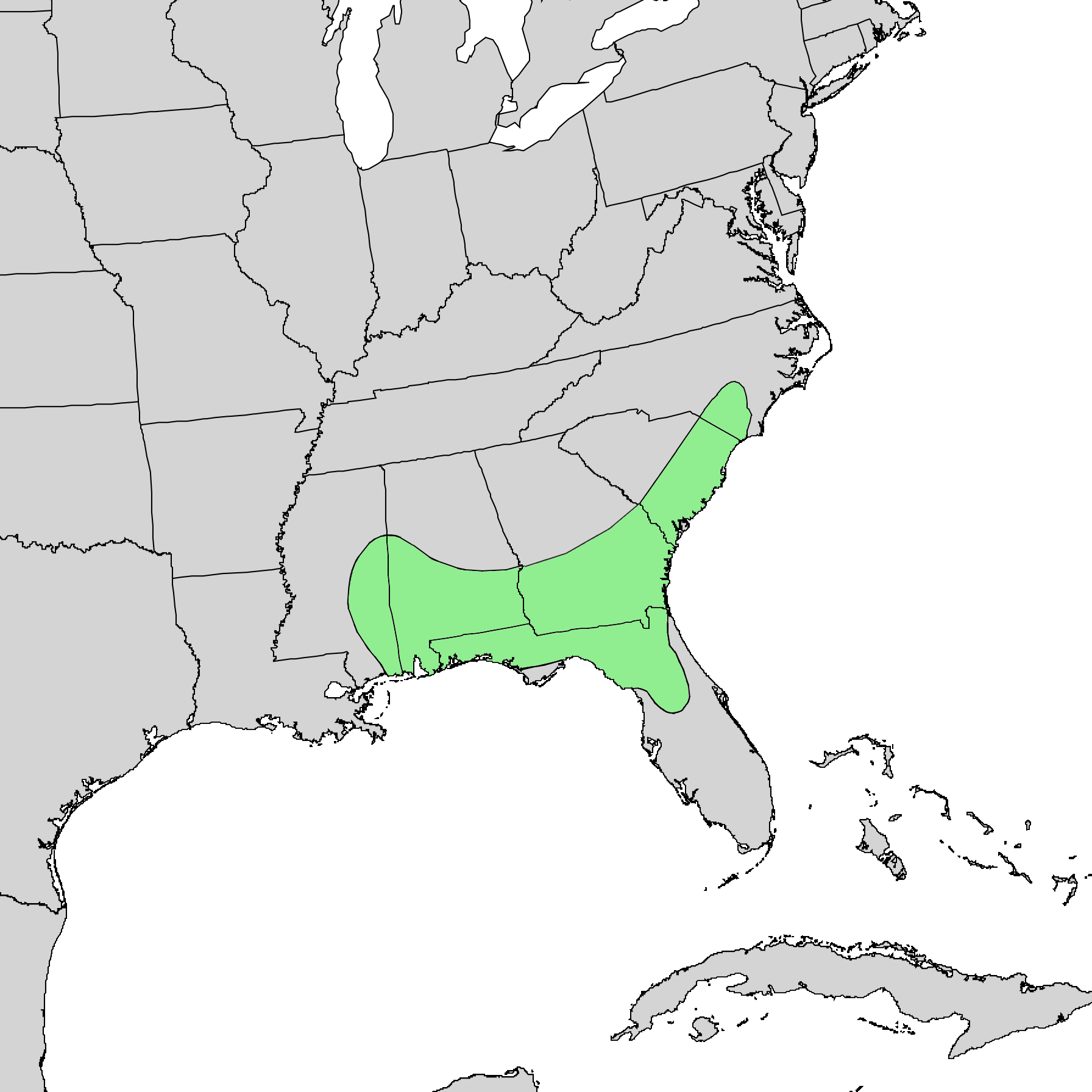
- Natural range for Quercus austrina

Synonyms
- Quercus durandii var. austrina (Small) E.J.Palmer

= Quercus austrina =

Species of oak tree

Quercus austrina, the bastard white oak or bluff oak, is an oak species that is endemic to the Coastal Plain of the southeastern United States from Mississippi to South Carolina; previously reported populations in Arkansas and North Carolina were misidentifications.

Quercus austrina can grow to a height of 45 to 60 feet (13.5–18 meters) with a spread of 35 to 50 feet (10.5–15 m). Leaves are narrow, with shallow rounded lobes. It tends to grow in wet habitats, such as on river bluffs, river bottoms, and flatwoods, and generally over basic substrates, such as mafic rocks, shells, or calcareous sediment.

Quercus austrina specimens have often been misidentified as either Q. sinuata or Q. nigra.

Quercus austrina is tolerant to clay, sand, loam, acidic, and well-drained soils. Also, it requires a lot of sun and its drought tolerance is high.

== National champion ==
The largest known bluff oak in the United States appeared on the National Register of Champion Trees in 2015. Located in Wakulla, Florida, the national champion specimen of Quercus austrina was nominated in 2009 by George Apthorp and crowned on September 1, 2015. It was last measured in 2014. By that time, the champion tree had attained a trunk circumference of 10 ft 8 in (3.25 m), a height of 129 ft (39 m) and a crown spread of 70 feet. The American Forests formula for assigning point scores to nominated trees is trunk circumference (in inches) + height (in feet) + 1/4 average crown spread (in feet), resulted in an overall score of 275 points.
