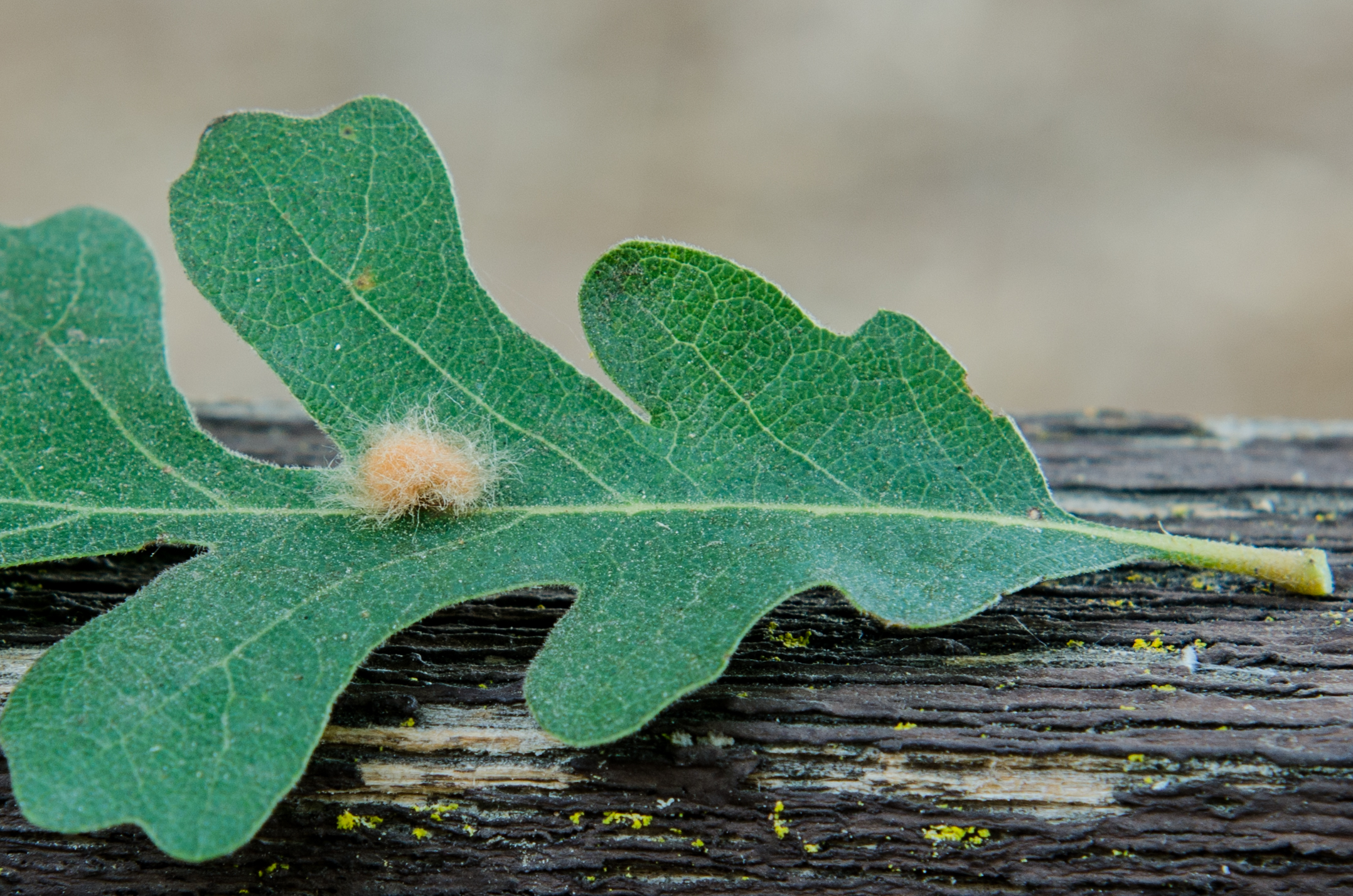
- The gall formed by D. fullawayi on an oak leaf

Scientific classification
- Kingdom: Animalia
- Phylum: Arthropoda
- Clade: Pancrustacea
- Class: Insecta
- Order: Hymenoptera
- Family: Cynipidae
- Genus: Druon
- Species: D. fullawayi

Binomial name
- Druon fullawayi Beutenmüller, 1913

Synonyms
- Andricus fullawayi

= Druon fullawayi =

Species of wasp

Druon fullawayi, also known as the yellow wig gall wasp, is a species of gall wasp in the family Cynipidae. It was previously placed in the genus Andricus. William Beutenmüller described the female adult wasps as 1.5-2.25 mm long, black with brown mouth parts and brown legs. The galls of D. fullawayi are tan or yellow, woolly, and measure 5–8 mm in diameter. Each gall holds a single chamber for larvae. They are found in California on oak trees, especially Quercus lobata.
