= Out of danger species =

Category of species

An out-of-danger species is an animal or plant species formerly categorized as Rare, Vulnerable, or Endangered that has since been removed from these lists because the species' survival has been relatively secured, e.g. Ginkgo biloba. Often known as a delisted species, these animals have been moved out of the Rare, Vulnerable, or Endangered categories through conservation efforts and government policymaking to ensure their survival and population growth. The International Union for Conservation of Nature (IUCN) established its list of endangered species in 1964, subsequently becoming a global authority on wildlife conservation. The following year, the United States created the U.S. Fish and Wildlife Service to act as a federal authority on endangered species. Currently, both international and domestic organizations implement recovery efforts and track species' population growth, delisting when necessary. Removing a species from the endangered species list is generally a slow process; most organizations and governments require long periods of observation both before and after delisting. There have been numerous efforts to delist endangered species, with both international and country-wide recovery plans being regularly implemented. These programs have led to the recovery of dozens of species, but their overall effectiveness remains contested.

== History ==
The first wildlife conservation law passed in the United States was the Lacey Act of 1900, which required the secretary of agriculture to "preserve, introduce, distribute, and restore" wild and game birds. In the 1960s, the Department of Interior formed a Committee on Rare and Endangered Wildlife Species to identify species in danger of extinction. The first official document listing the species that the federal government declared in danger of extinction was published as the 'Redbook on Rare and Endangered Fish and Wildlife of the United States in 1964. The Bureau of Sport Fisheries and Wildlife (renamed U.S. Fish and Wildlife Service in 1974) was created in 1965 by The Fish and Wildlife Act and is the authority on the official federal list of endangered species today. The first species to be delisted from the Endangered Species list due to recovery (as opposed to extinction or listing error) was the Brown Pelican in 1985. Beyond domestic classifications within the U.S., international non-governmental organizations (NGOs) have developed separate classification and prevention systems. The International Union for Conservation of Nature (IUCN), which established its list of endangered species in 1964, is the global authority on species conservation and recovery. Many nations have implemented laws that protect endangered species by, for example, banning hunting or creating protected areas. More extensive measures such as captive breeding and habitat restoration have also been undertaken, especially by nations that rely on revenue from tourism.

== Policy ==
=== Global ===
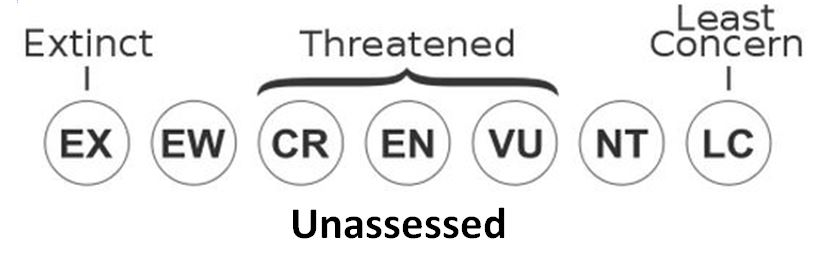
IUCN classification of species by level of endangerment

The IUCN Red List is the world's most comprehensive inventory of the conservation status of biological species. It serves as a global indicator for biodiversity and provides information about population size, habitat, and threats to the population that help inform conservation decisions. Species are reassessed each time a new version of the list is published, and some are downlisted or delisted if certain criteria are met. Species are examined for a multitude of factors, including if their main threats remain prevalent and whether conservation measures have engendered enough of an improvement to warrant a change in threat category or complete removal from the list. The IUCN relies on global scientific research to refine its assessments and accurately assess whether a species is improving or deteriorating.

Country-wide efforts take on many forms, as each nation develops different strategies to shorten the endangered species list. Some, like Australia and the United States, use recovery plans enacted by the national government to guide conservation, while others rely more heavily on captive breeding programs. The effectiveness of these efforts also differ, with ninety percent of North/Central American countries and seventy percent of African countries being classified as above-average performers on a Megafauna Conservation Index (MCI) developed by researchers in Global Ecology and Conservation. Conversely, approximately twenty-five percent of Asian countries and twenty percent of European countries were found to be under-performers; some argue that these disparities are due to disparate levels of reliance on wildlife tourism.

=== By Country ===
==== United States ====
Currently, the delisting of out-of-danger species in the United States is governed by the Endangered Species Act of 1973 (ESA). The law was enacted to prevent endangered species from becoming extinct and is jointly administered by the U.S Department of the Interior, the U.S Department of Commerce, and the U.S Department of Agriculture. Federal policy differentiates between an "endangered species," which is at risk of extinction throughout most or all of its population, and a "threatened species," a less severe classification referring to a species that is likely to become endangered in the foreseeable future. The delisting of a species, which can be formally defined as the removal of species from the Federal Lists of Endangered and Threatened Wildlife and Plants, is governed by section 4 of the ESA. The process occurs when a species is determined to no longer be at risk; this assessment is based on factors such as population size, habitat quality, and elimination of threats. After being delisted, the species must be monitored for at least five years to ensure that recovery remains stable. There is a similar process governed by the ESA known as downlisting. While it is close to delisting, it deals with the downgrade of a species from endangered to threatened as opposed to their complete removal from the list.

== Recovery efforts and challenges ==
In the United States, recovery is defined as the process of restoring endangered and threatened species to the point where they no longer require the safeguards of the ESA. Recovery plans are developed by departments like National Oceanic and Atmospheric Administration (NOAA) and the U.S Fish and Wildlife Services to outline a strategy to restore self-sufficient wild populations of engendered species. They are non-regulatory documents developed in conjunction with interested parties in federal, state, local, and tribal governments; successful implementation often results in downlisting or delisting, and the removal of ESA protections. Species are tracked over time while these agencies implement individual recovery actions. For example, ten federal agencies formed the Columbia River Basin Federal Caucus to promote recovery of native fish and wildlife listed under the Endangered Species Act in the Columbia River Basin, including the Middle Columbia River Steelhead.

In July 2021, the IUCN implemented a new metric for assessing species recovery. Known as the "green status," it ranges from 0 to 100 and is calculated using the population of a species prior to human interference. It also tracks the impact of previous conservation efforts; the hypothetical effect of stopping current conservation efforts; as well as future potential species recovery.

Despite these efforts, listings of endangered species tend to outpace delistings. Some hold the view that most species can expect an extended, if not permanent residence on the endangered species list. They argue that a lack of protections against important causes of species decline results in most species remaining on the list forever, and warn that the detriments of a mistaken delisting generally outweigh those of extended retention on the protected list. The slow speed of delisting is not always been seen as negative, and has been cited as demonstrative of the importance of the ESA. Occasionally, advocacy groups have filed lawsuits to challenge the Fish and Wildlife Service's delisting of a species, as was the case with both Yellowstone grizzly bear and Sonoran Desert bald eagle. Controversy is not uncommon in these decisions, as some worry about the consequences engendered by a species' loss of ESA protections. Critics of the ESA argue that recovery efforts focus on charismatic species to the detriment of others, especially plants. Proposed improvements to current recovery policy come in many forms, including strengthening partnerships with states and corporations, a higher level of species monitoring, and the use of climate-smart conservation strategies.

=== DDT ban ===
One event that contributed to the recovery efforts of several bird species in the United States was the banning of the chemical commonly known as DDT (dichlorodiphenyltrichloroethane). This chemical became a well-known synthetic pesticide after its use during WWII to prevent insect-carried diseases from affecting American troops. After the war, DDT became a popular agricultural insecticide. DDT's harmful environmental effects largely affected bird populations, as the chemical caused the bird's eggshells to become dangerously brittle and reduced the reproductive abilities of bird populations. In 1962, American biologist Rachel Carson published the book Silent Spring, which raised public awareness about the harmful effects of DDT and questioned the widespread release of the chemical into the environment. On 14 July 1972, the Administrator of the Environmental Protection Agency canceled nearly all remaining federal registrations of DDT products.

== Examples ==
=== American alligator ===
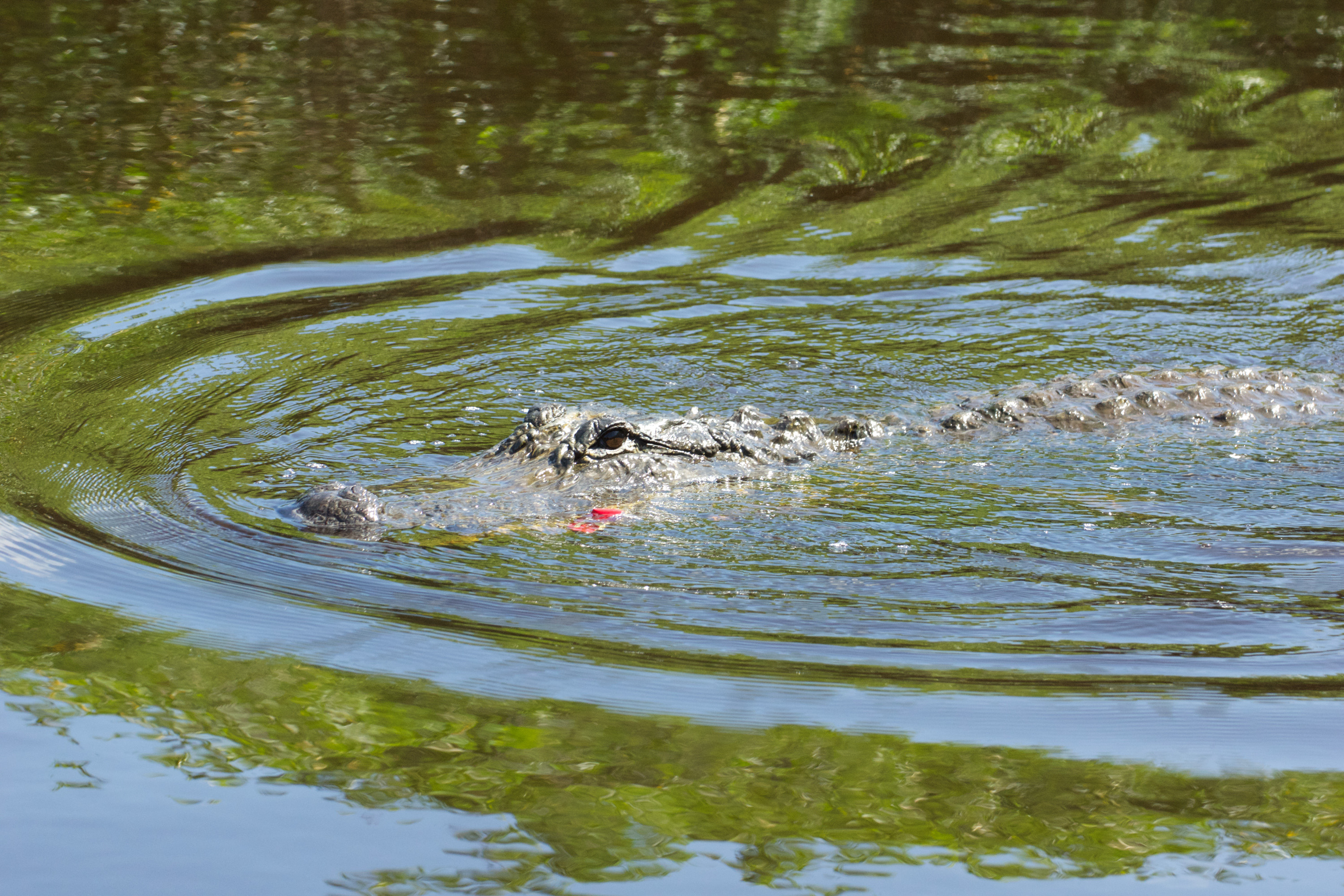
American Alligator (Alligator mississippiensis), Florida, United States

The American alligator (Alligator mississippiensis) is a member of the order Crocodilia. They are apex predators who help to control the number of rodents and other animals that might otherwise overtax marshland vegetation. The species saw a dramatic population decline in the mid-20th century. When its population reached an all-time low in 1967, it was officially recognized as an endangered species. The U.S. government, in conjunction with the southern states, cracked down on the hunting of alligators and heavily monitored population growth. They were officially delisted in 1987 after U.S. Fish and Wildlife Services announced they had made a full recovery. Moreover, the IUCN now considers them of lowest risk/least concern and has commented on their positive response to intervention and rapid recovery. Sustainable management programs have operated in Louisiana, Florida, Texas, and other southeastern states for years. The prevalence and availability of healthy populations has led to numerous investigations of alligator biology.

=== Arabian oryx ===
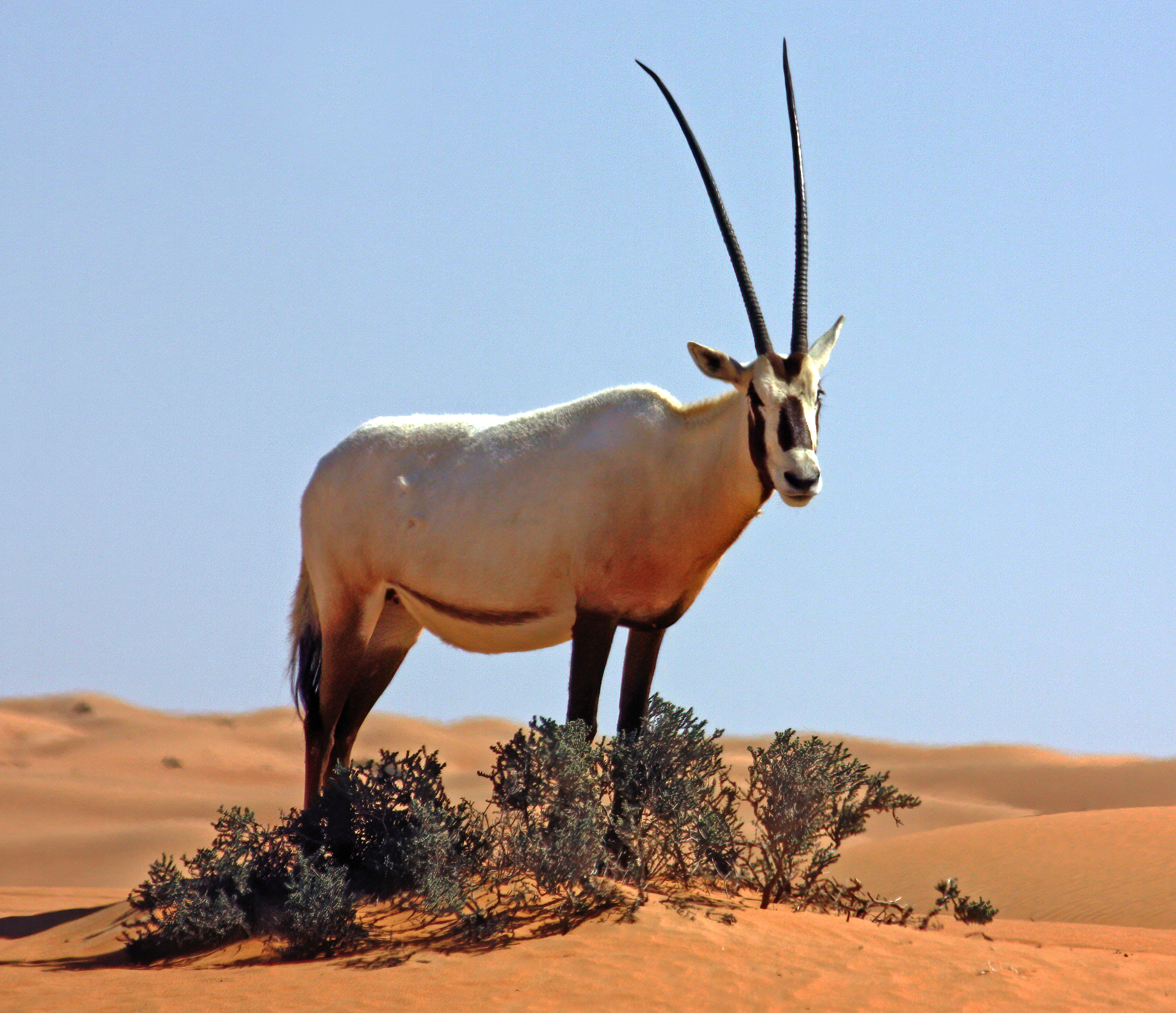
Arabian oryx (Oryx leucoryx), Dubai Desert Conservation Area, UAE

The Arabian oryx (Oryx leucoryx) is a species of antelope native to the Arabian Peninsula and is locally referred to as Al Maha. Despite the last wild Oryx being shot in 1972, captive breeding and subsequent reintroduction efforts downlisted the species from endangered to vulnerable on the IUCN Red List, a three-category improvement. This reintroduction process was heavily supported by the local Harasis bedu people that established safe grazing areas for the reintroduced herds. The reintroduction process faced many challenges and setbacks due to poachers and an oil pipeline being built on Oman's Arabian Oryx Sanctuary in 2007. However, as of 2011, the peninsula hosted over 1,000 wild specimens, with another 7,000 living in captivity. The Arabian Oryx's shift from endangered to vulnerable in 2011 was the first time the IUCN had reclassified a species as vulnerable after it had been extinct in the wild.

=== Bald eagle ===
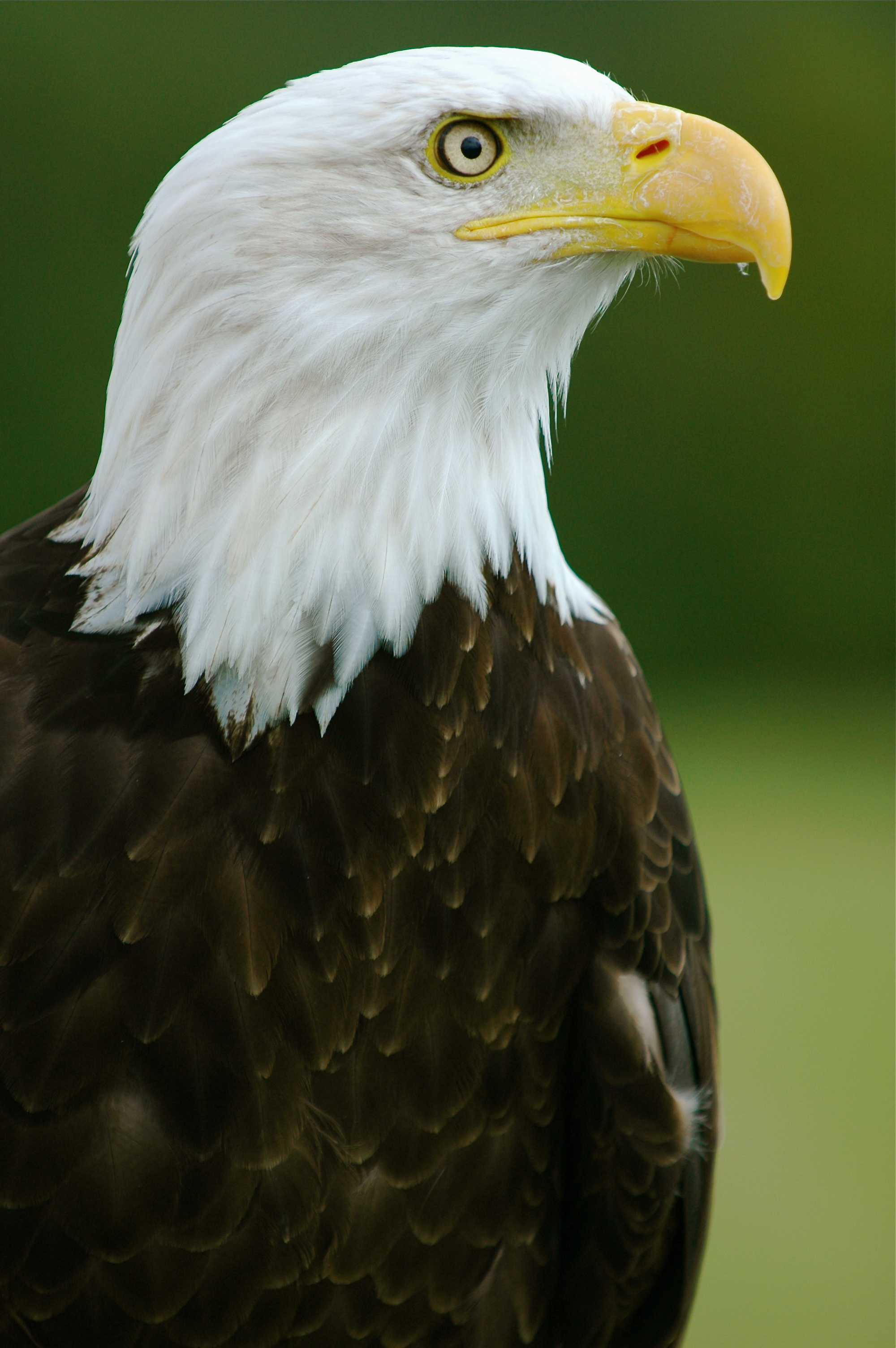
Bald eagle (Haliaeetus leucocephalus)

The bald eagle (Haliaeetus leucocephalus) is a large, carnivorous bird of prey that can often be found near bodies of water. The population saw a decrease in the mid-20th century as they lost habitat due to urbanization, hunting, and the widespread use of DDT. People at that time believed that the eagles were responsible for the abduction of smaller cattle, and in some cases, attacking children. However, this was disproven, and in 1978, the Endangered Species Technical Bulletin attributed most eagle deaths to preventative killings caused by these beliefs. Along with direct attacks on the species, the pesticide DDT played a key role in the population diminishing through biomagnification. DDT did not affect grown adult eagles, but it did alter their calcium metabolism to make them either sterile or incapable of producing healthy eggs. Researchers found that eggs that were produced were often too brittle to withstand the weight of a brooding adult eagle. Subsequently, regulations and protections have been implemented, including permit requirements to hunt eagles. The U.S. government removed the species from its endangered species list in 1995, and it was removed from the endangered and threatened category in 2007. While they are out of danger, the bald eagle is still under the protection of the Bald and Golden Eagle Protection Act and the Migratory Bird Treaty Act.

=== Gray wolf ===
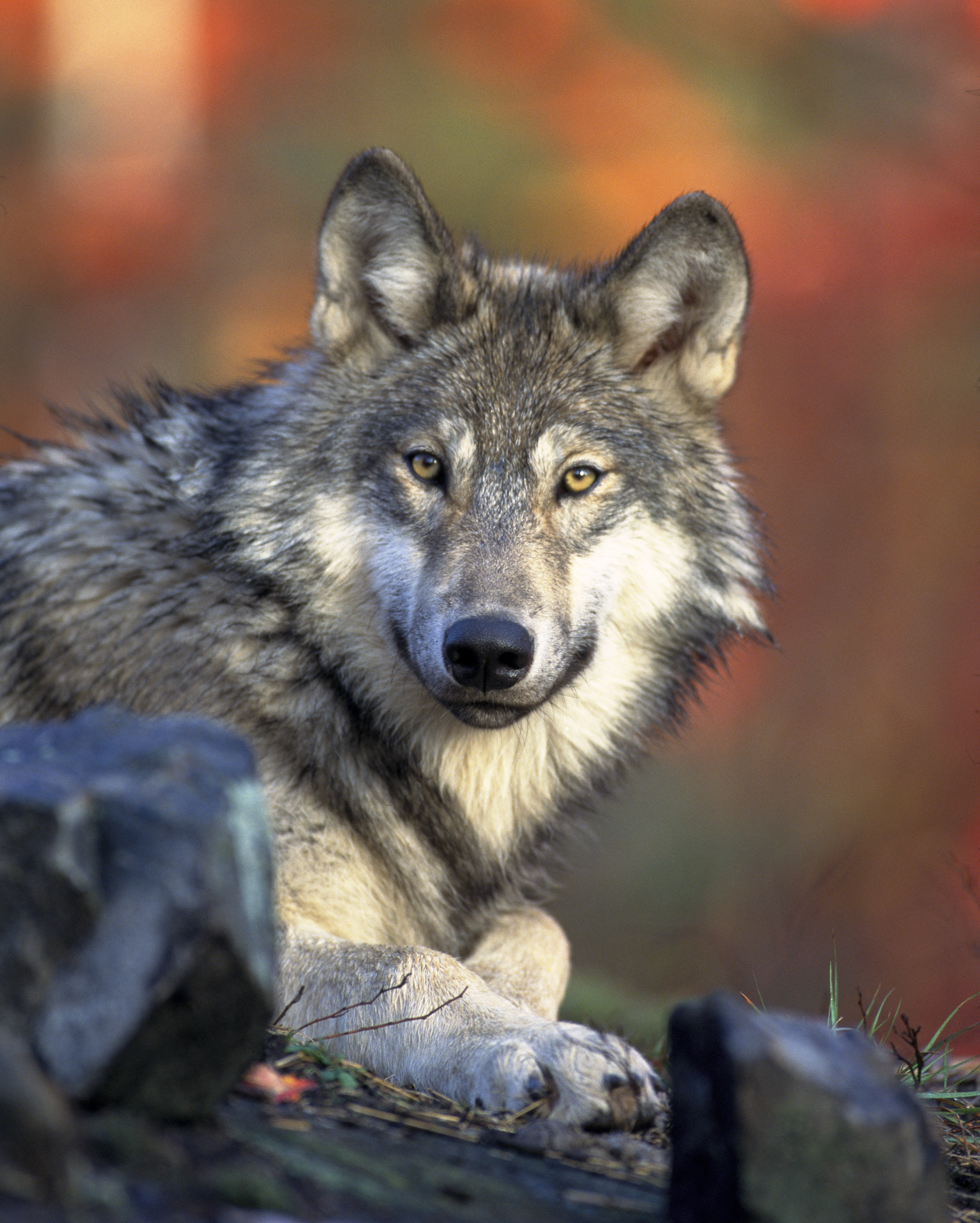
Gray wolf (Canis lupus)

The gray wolf (Canis lupus) is one of the most recent species to be categorized as out-of-danger in the U.S. The population of gray wolves declined in America through the 1960s as productivity in the agriculture industry increased and gray wolves were seen as threats to cattle. At its low in 1985, their population reached about 300 in total and their habitat was reduced to just northern Michigan and Minnesota, as well as Wisconsin. Thanks to being put under the protection of the Endangered Species Act of 1973, conservationists were able to promote the species' safety and the population began to slowly rise and return to its normal numbers. By 2020, the population in America reached over 6,000, and the wolves' geographic territory had expended, which exceeded the expectations of conservationists. The gray wolf has now been removed from the list of endangered and threatened species. Now that the numbers have returned to a sustainable state, the U.S. Fish and Wildlife Service will continue to monitor the species to ensure that both it and the cattle to which they are considered a danger remain safe.

=== Giant panda ===
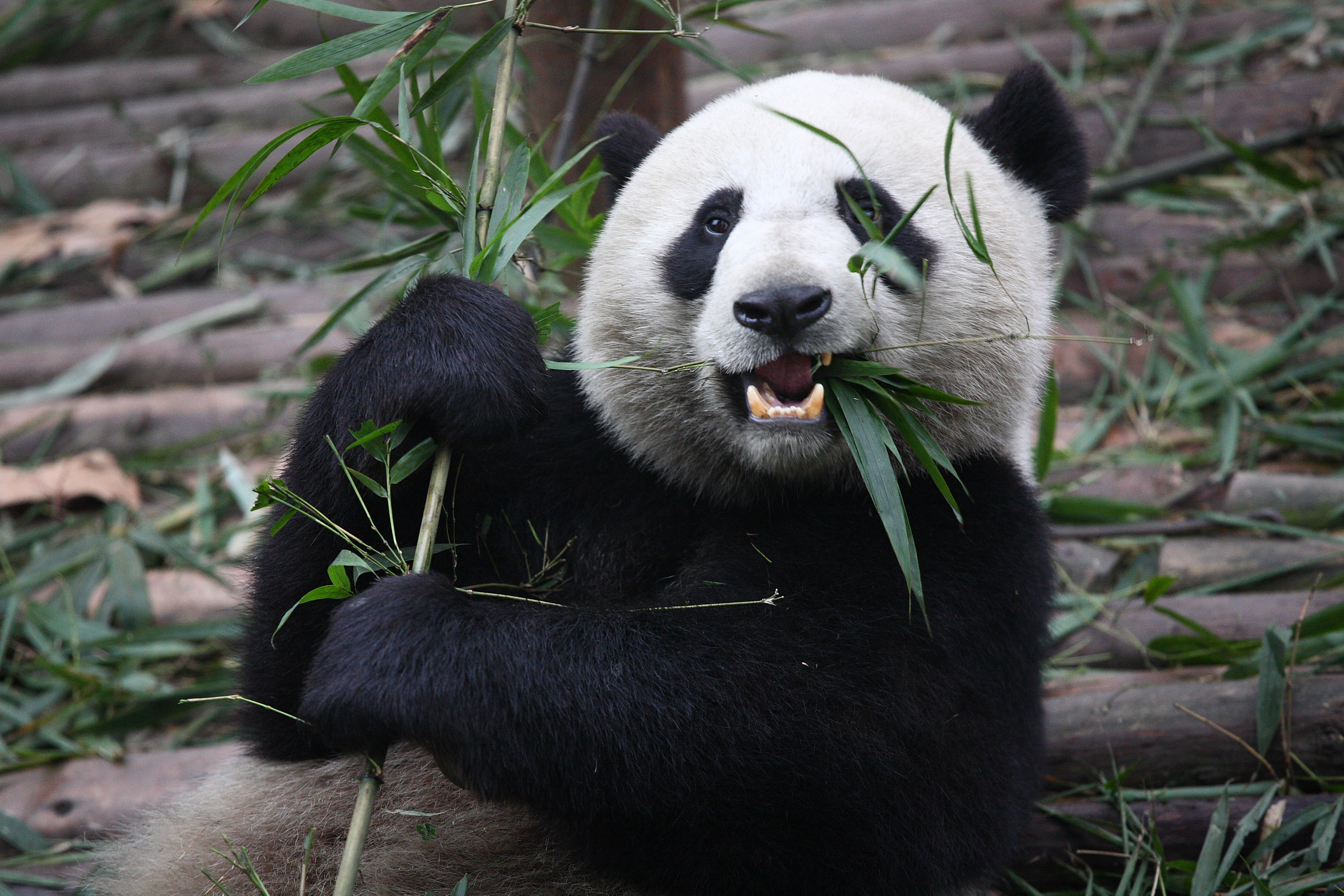
Giant panda (Ailuropoda melanoleuca), Shanghai, China

The giant panda (Ailuropoda melanoleuca) is native to south-central China. The species mainly reside in temperate forests high in the mountains and subsist almost entirely on bamboo. These bears must eat large quantities of bamboo every day and are excellent tree climbers, despite their size. In the 1960s, the species experienced near extinction due to a diminishing habitat and a pelt that was considered valuable to humans, which led to widespread hunting and confinement. The wild population continued to decline until conservation groups and government agencies stepped in. Since then, the population has dramatically increased relative to its almost non-existence. In 2016, they were moved from the list of Endangered Species to Vulnerable Species according to the International Union for Conservation of Nature (IUCN). At their current rate of growth, they may soon exit that category as well. There are currently 67 panda reserves that protect 66% of wild pandas.

=== Ginkgo biloba ===
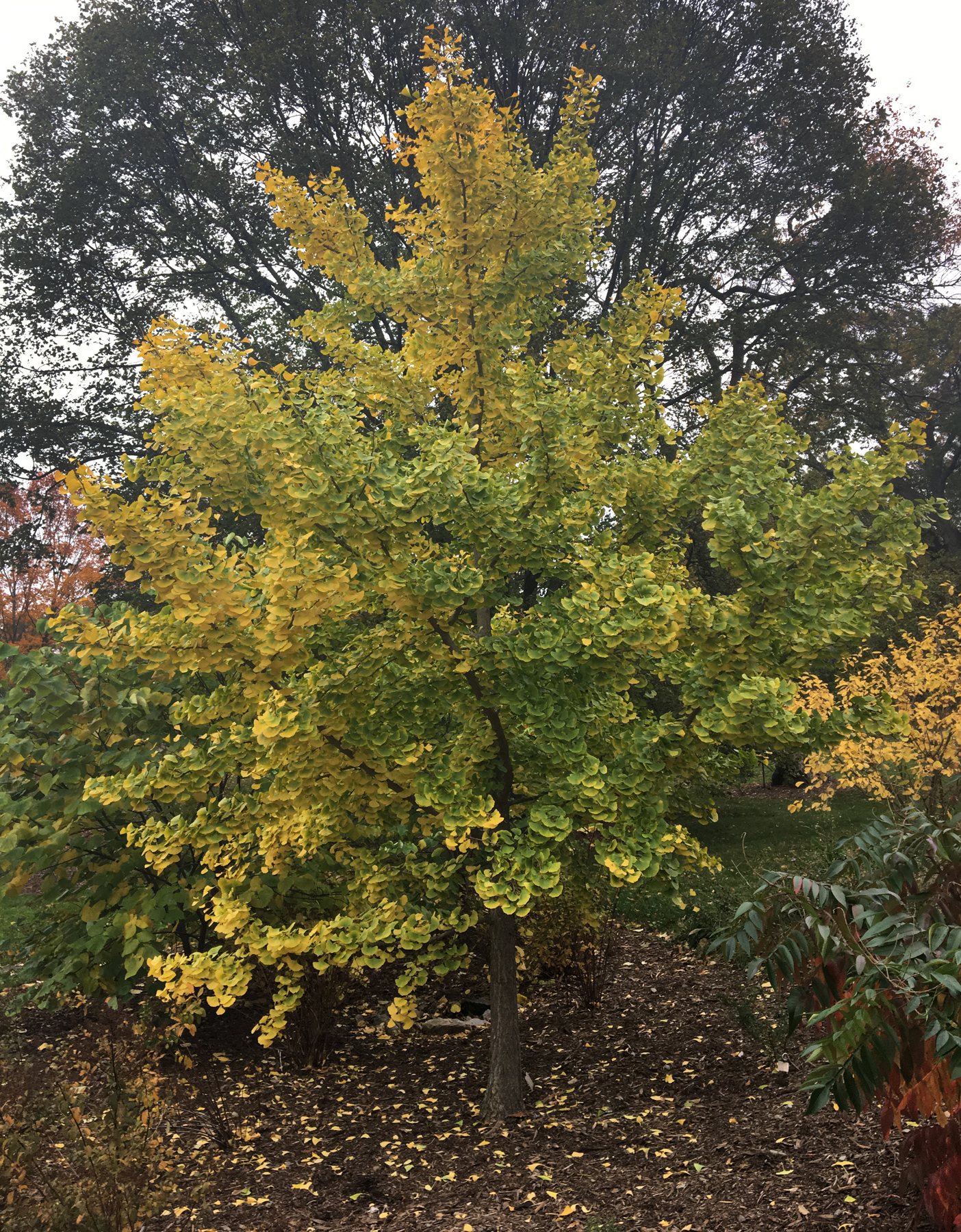
Maidenhair tree (Ginkgo biloba)

Ginkgo biloba, commonly known as the maidenhair tree, is the last of the division Ginkgophyta and has fossils dating back to the Jurassic Age, making it one of the oldest living tree species in the world. The rest of its division is believed to have gone extinct around the same time as the dinosaurs. Populations of this plant in the wild are still considered endangered by the IUCN. However, it is widely cultivated worldwide, especially in China and Japan where it is native and is popular for both medicinal uses as well as its use in culinary practices. Its fruit is often used in cooking and is considered a delicacy in China.

=== Potentilla robbinsiana ===
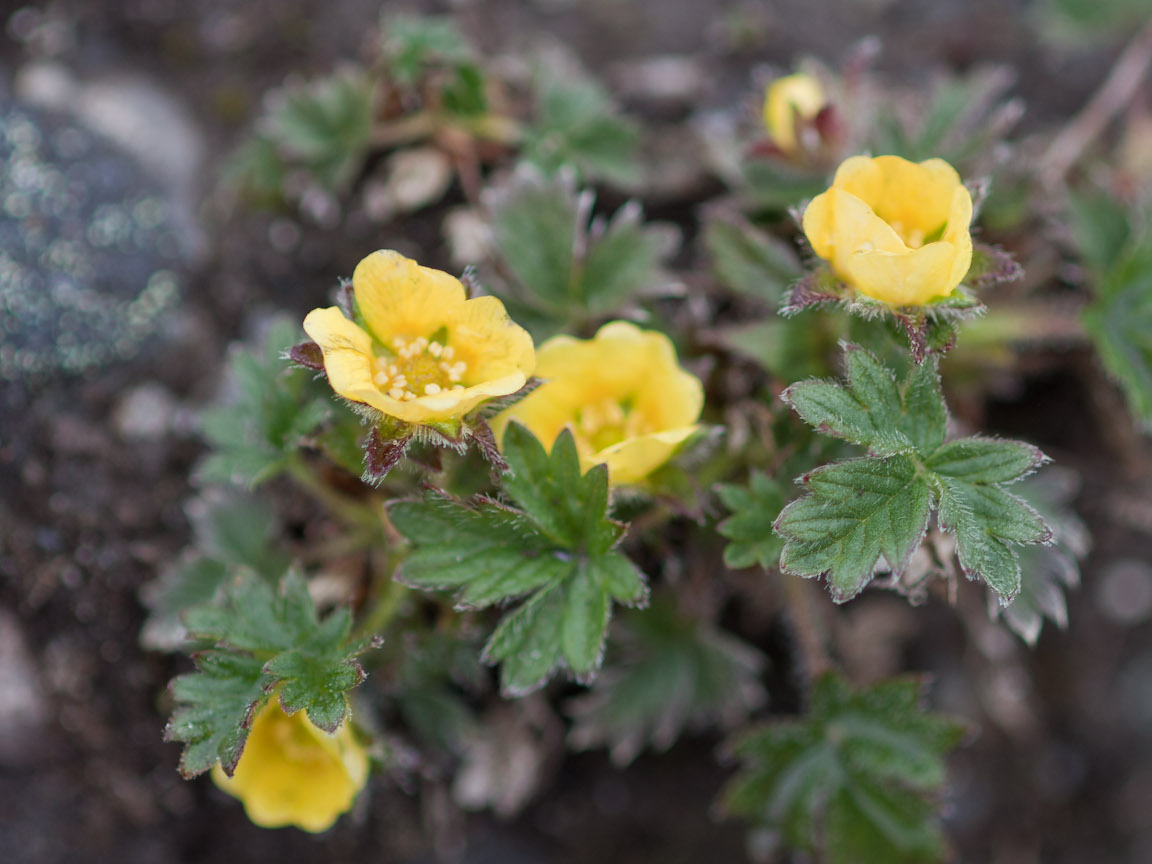
Robbins's cinquefoil (Potentilla robbinsiana)

The Potentilla robbinsiana or Robbins's cinquefoil is a dwarf alpine plant located in New Hampshire’s White Mountains and Franconia Ridge. It is a small, yellow-flowered perennial member of the rose family. After a large hiking trail was built through Monroe Flats—home to more than 95 percent of the world's Robbins' cinquefoil—a combination of harvesting and foot traffic pushed the species to the brink of extinction. After being placed on the endangered species list, the Monroe Flats trail was rerouted, and work began to germinate new satellite colonies of the species. These efforts caused the population to grow from 1,801 to 4,831 between 1973 and 2006, and the species was officially delisted in 2002. New colonies are especially prevalent in the Mount Washington area, where the species survives best on rocky sites similar to its natural habitat.

== See also ==
- Arabian Oryx Sanctuary
- Endangered species
- Conservation biology
- Conservation-reliant species
- Conservation status
- Sustainability
- Wildlife conservation
