= Maude Jeannie Young =

Texas state botanist, writer and teacher (1826–1882)

Maude Jeannie Young née Fuller (November 1, 1826 – April 15, 1882) was a botanist and author. She is most recognized for her writing and advocacy in support of the Confederacy during the American Civil War.

== Early life ==
Matilda Jane Fuller was born November 1, 1826, in Beaufort, North Carolina, her family moved to Alabama in 1939 and Houston, Texas in 1843 (age 17) with her father, Nathan Fuller, who would later serve as mayor of Houston 1853-1854. At the age of 21 she would marry a doctor, Samuel O. Young, who died just nine months later. Maude returned home and delivered their only child, named for his late father. In her younger years she wrote poems, fictions, and essays for Houston papers and magazines.

== Civil War years ==
With the outbreak of the Civil War, Maude focused on inspirational writing in support of Confederate soldiers, using pen names such as The Confederate Lady and The Soldier's Friend. She also nursed and collected clothing and money to support the war effort. Maude designed a flag for her son's brigade, Hood's Texas Brigade. General John Bell Hood designated it as the Brigade's official flag at the battle of Gettysburg. Towards the end of the war, the flag was worn to the point of not being fit to use, and the 5th regiment returned it to her for safekeeping. At a 1926 reunion of the brigade it was presented to the state. In 1872, the Hood's Brigade Association was organized and the first resolution declared Young the "Mother of Hood's Brigade.

As the war wound down, she called for continued resistance within Texas in support of the Confederate cause.

She is related to Confederate General Braxton Bragg.

== Botany career ==
After the war, Maude took an interest in botany and taught in public and private schools in Houston. Her writing turned to natural history topics on local flora and fauna and encouraging conservation.

In 1873, as State Botanist, Maude became one of the first Texans to write a textbook "Familiar Lessons in Botany, with Flora of Texas" It was used by Texas students for years.

Maude died on April 15, 1882. In 1900, the Great Galveston Hurricane destroyed much of her works, along with her herbarium.
