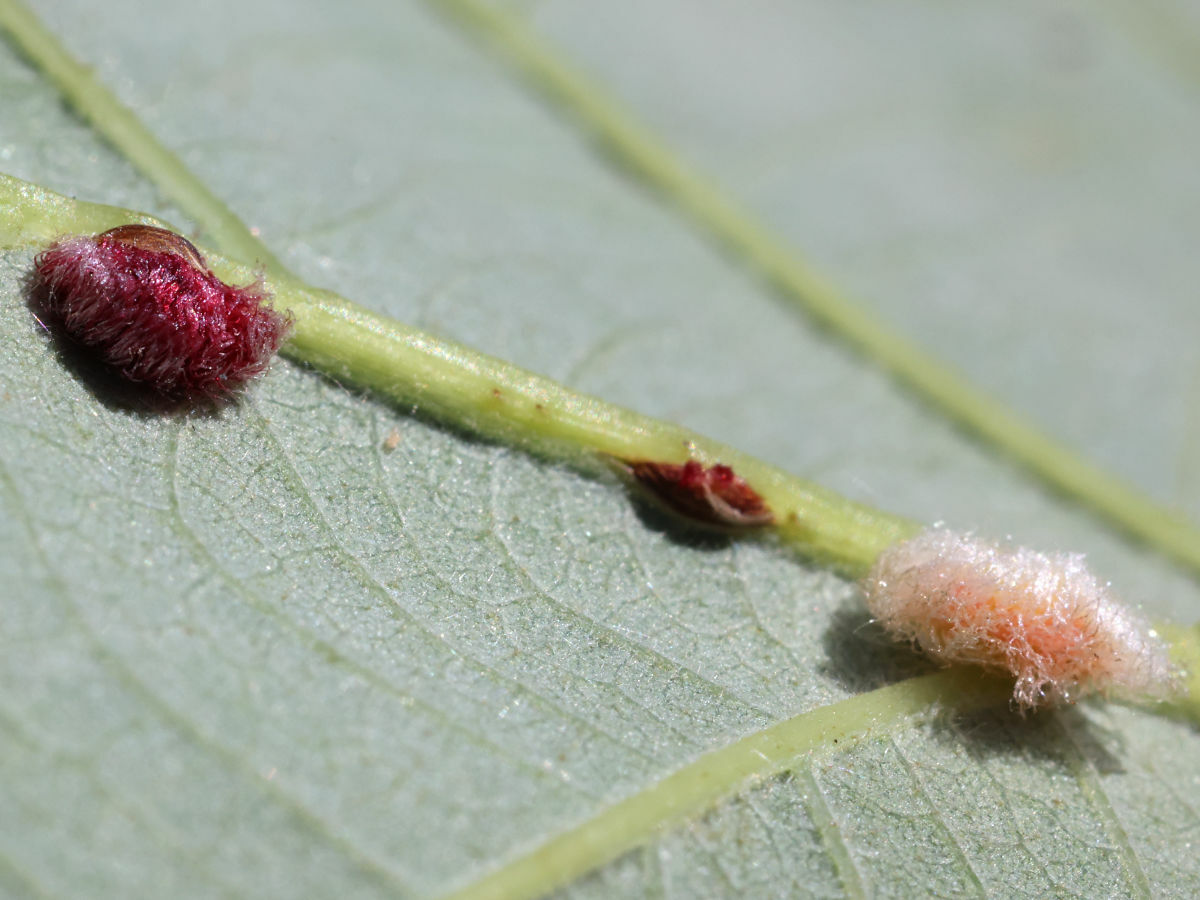
- D. ignotum galls

Scientific classification
- Kingdom: Animalia
- Phylum: Arthropoda
- Clade: Pancrustacea
- Class: Insecta
- Order: Hymenoptera
- Family: Cynipidae
- Tribe: Cynipini
- Genus: Druon; Kinsey, 1937

Type species
- Druon protagion Kinsey, 1937

= Druon (wasp) =

Genus of wasps

Druon is a genus of gall wasps in the family Cynipidae. Druon used to be belong to the genus Andricus but has been since separated thanks to molecular evidence.

Most species within Druon are only known to show asexual generations. However, D. ignotum and D. quercuslanigerum display cyclical thelytoky, showing alternating sexual and asexual populations.

== Species ==
The type species is Druon protagion. Recognised species include:

- Druon alexandri Melika, Nicholls & Stone, 2022
- Druon flocculentum (Lyon, 1996)
- Druon fullawayi (Beutenmüller, 1913)
- Druon garciamartinonae Pujade-Villar, 2022
- Druon gregori Melika, Nicholls & Stone, 2022
- Druon hansoni Cuesta-Porta, Melika & Pujade-Villar, 2022
- Druon ignotum (Bassett, 1881)
- Druon laceyi Zhang, Sasan & O'Kennon, 2022
- Druon linaria Kinsey, 1937
- Druon pattoni (Bassett, 1881)
- Druon protagion Kinsey, 1937
- Druon quercusflocci (Walsh, 1864)
- Druon quercuslanigerum (Ashmead, 1881)
- Druon receptum Kinsey, 1937
- Druon rusticum Kinsey, 1937
- Druon serretae Pujade-Villar, Cuesta-Porta & Melika, 2022
