= Shin oak =

Shin oak is a common name for several oaks and may refer to:

- Quercus grisea
- Quercus havardii
- Quercus mohriana
