= American Forests =

US non-profit organization

- Abbreviation: AF
- Merged into: American Forestry Congress
- Formation: September 1875; 151 years ago
- Founder: John Aston Warder
- Founded at: Chicago
- Legal status: 501(c)(3)
- Purpose: Forest conservation
- Official language: English
- Website: americanforests.org
- Formerly called: American Forestry Association

American Forests is a 501(c)(3) non-profit conservation organization, established in 1875, and dedicated to protecting and restoring healthy forest ecosystems. The current headquarters are in Washington, D.C.

== Activities ==
The mission of American Forests is "Creating Healthy and Resilient Forests, from Cities to Wilderness, that Deliver Essential Benefits for Climate, People, Water and Wildlife." American Forests' activities comprise four separate program areas: rural forest restoration, equitable tree canopy in cites, the National Register of Champion Trees, and forest policy. In addition, the organization publishes a quarterly magazine.

=== Reforestation of Rural Forest Landscapes ===
Across North America, millions of acres of native forests have been lost or degraded by disasters like wildfires, pests, and disease, as well as human actions like mining, development, and widespread clearing for unsustainable practices. Forest restoration can bring native forests back while also creating green jobs.

=== Tree Equity for Under-served Communities ===
Through their Tree Equity program, American Forests is responding to this challenge by leading the move for Tree Equity in cities across America. They partner with city leaders and community groups (22 cities and counting) to develop science-based urban forestry programs to grow and maintain tree canopy in neighborhoods that have fallen behind. They advocate for and fund urban forestry, launch high-impact planting projects, build public awareness, and lead national efforts to increase federal, state, and local funding for urban forestry projects.

=== National Register of Champion Trees ===
American Forests enlists hundreds of volunteers in the United States to locate, protect, and register the largest trees, and to educate the public about the benefits of mature trees and forests. It is active in all 50 states, the District of Columbia and has been used as a model for many state big tree programs and several international ones, in places such as Australia, New Zealand, South Korea and Mexico. More than 750 U.S. champions are crowned each year and documented in its biannual publication, the National Register of Champion Trees. For more than 70 years, the goal of the program has remained: to preserve and promote the iconic stature of these living monarchs and to educate people about the key role that these remarkable trees and forests play in sustaining a healthy environment.

=== Forest Policy ===
The organization also works to advocate for the protection and restoration of rural and urban forests through public policy, and engage members of a community in the management of their natural resources through various community coalitions.

=== Magazine ===
The organization publishes a quarterly magazine, American Forests, formerly called American Forests and Forest Life (1924–1930), American Forestry (1910–1923), Conservation (1908–1909), Forestry and Irrigation (1902–1908), and The Forester (1895–1901). The first three issues of volume one were titled New Jersey Forester.

== History ==
American Forests was established in September 1875 as the American Forestry Association (AFA) by physician and horticulturist John Aston Warder and a group of like-minded citizens in Chicago. The object of the organization was to collect and disseminate information on forestry and to foster the conservation of the existing forests. In 1882, the AFA was merged into the American Forestry Congress, which organized that year in Cincinnati, Ohio. It became at once nationally influential in promoting the cause of forestry. In 1889 the original name was resumed.

The AFA has:

- originated the idea for a national forest system and the U.S. Forest Service;
- created the first conservation periodical in the nation;
- successfully advocated for the expansion of national forests in the eastern U.S.;
- worked with Franklin D. Roosevelt to create the Civilian Conservation Corps;
- provided a platform for legendary conservation heroes like Gifford Pinchot, Aldo Leopold and Ansel Adams; and
- helped pioneer and advance the field of urban forestry.

During the early years of its existence, the AFA relied on annual reports, occasional bulletins, and the general press for the publication of information about forestry. In 1897 it was incorporated, and it took over from the New Jersey Forestry Association the publication of the periodical The Forester, changing the title later to Forestry and Irrigation, then Conservation, and, finally, American Forests. By 1920, the AFA had about 10,000 members, and was active and influential in educating public sentiment and in shaping forestry legislation.

The AFA was long active in the conservation movement, advocating for the creation of forest reserves, for passage of the Weeks Act, and for creation of the Civilian Conservation Corps. In 1924, the AFA started what would become a national tradition by donating the first living national Christmas tree to the White House.

In 1940, the AFA began maintaining the National Register of Champion Trees, a list of the largest trees of each native and naturalized species in the United States. Candidates for the National Register are nominated by coordinators, big-tree hunters and volunteers across the U.S. in what has become an annual competition between individuals, counties, and even states to hold the most champion trees.

In 1990, the AFA created the Global ReLeaf program, which plants trees to restore forested ecosystems across the U.S. and around the world. Currently more than 40 million trees have been planted through this program.

In 1992, the AFA changed its name to American Forests to better reflect its environmental efforts. What began as an association of professional foresters, now has a membership of individuals who care about trees and forests: environmentalists, recreational enthusiasts and tree lovers.

== See also ==
- Sustainable forest management
- Conservation movement
- Old growth forest
- Biodiversity
- Ecosystem
- Natural landscape
