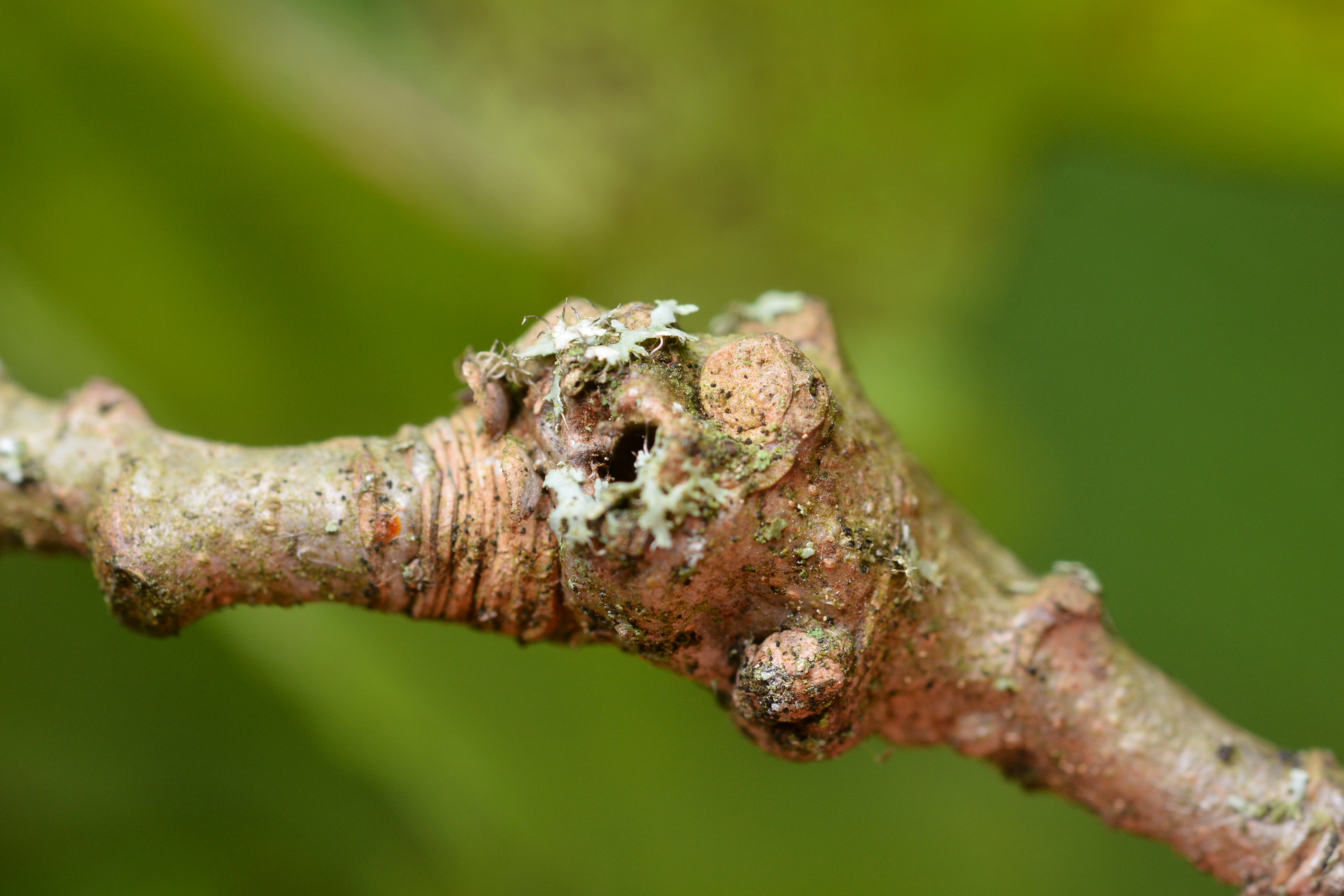

Scientific classification
- Kingdom: Animalia
- Phylum: Arthropoda
- Clade: Pancrustacea
- Class: Insecta
- Order: Hymenoptera
- Family: Cynipidae
- Genus: Andricus
- Species: A. inflator

Binomial name
- Andricus inflator (Hartig, 1840)

Synonyms
- Andricus globuli (Hartig, 1840); Andricus inflatioides Belizin & Maisuradze, 1962; Cynips globuli Hartig, 1840

= Andricus inflator =

Species of wasp

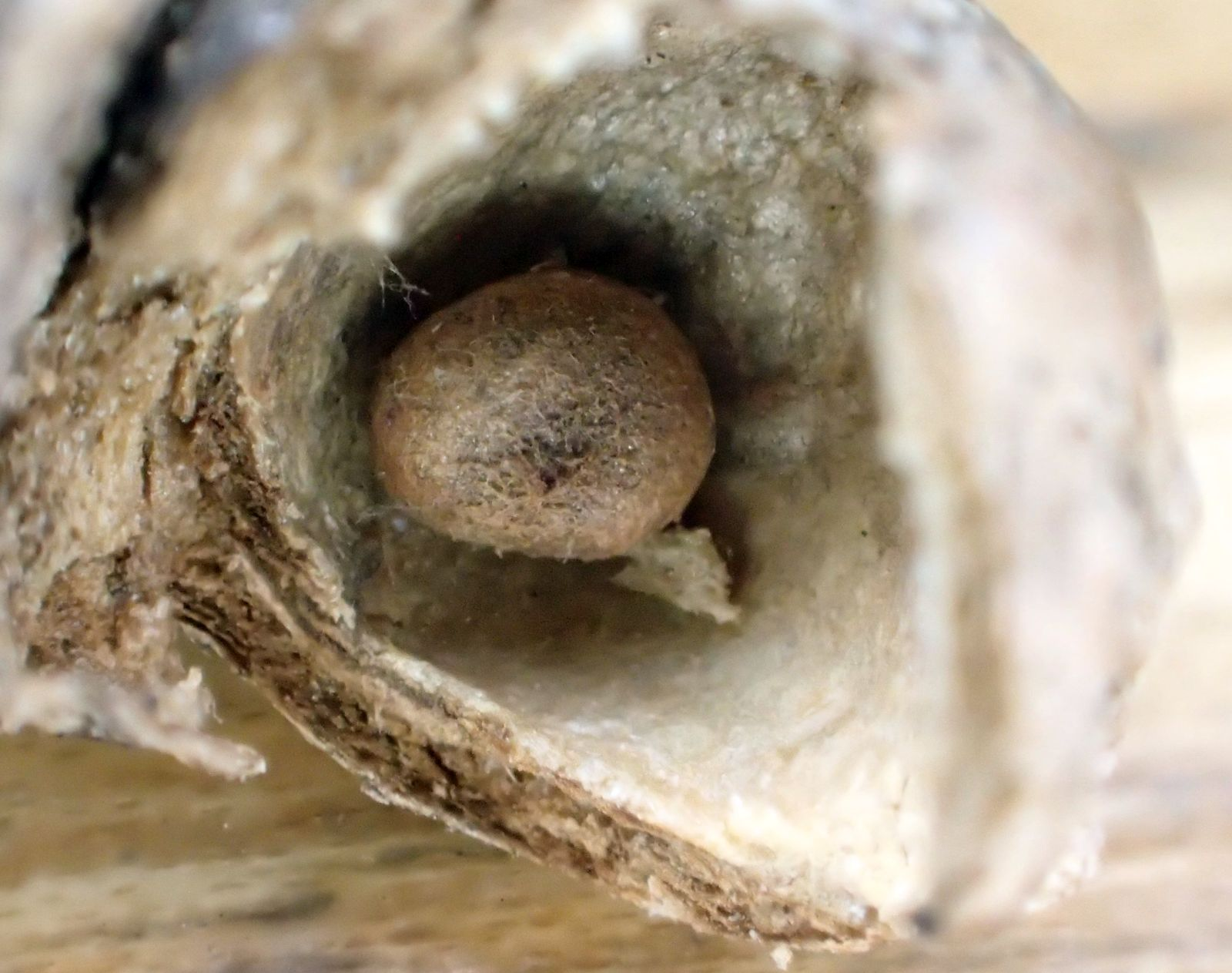
Andricus inflator pupa in a gall on an oak twig

Andricus inflator is a species of gall-forming wasps, in the genus Andricus, which has a sexual and an asexual generation, producing two different galls. The wasp was named by the German biologist Theodor Hartig, in 1840 and is found in Europe.

== Description of the gall ==
Like many oak gall wasps, there are two generations per cycle, with one sexual and one asexual, each creating different galls. In spring, the sexual gall is a swelling at the tip of the twig which can be up to 15 mm across. The interior cavitity is long and narrow and at the bottom is an egg-shaped inner gall, containing the larval gall wasp. Old galls persist and can have new shoots growing from them. They are green at first, later becoming the same colour as the twig. The wasps emerge in the summer and after mating, females from the sexual gall lay their eggs on a bud, especially on buds sprouting straight from the trunk. The resulting asexual gall is a small, green, egg-shaped swelling up to 6 mm across and is surrounded by bud scales. Each gall contains a single larva {according to Chinery) or more (according to Plant Parasites of Europe), can be found from September to November and, as it matures, turns brown, falling to the ground in late autumn. Larvae pupate in the gall and appear in the spring although some can spend two or three winters in the gall before they emerge to lay eggs in the young twigs.

Female wasps lay their eggs on various species of oak, including Hungarian oak (Quercus frainetto), Lusitanian oak (Quercus lusitanica), sessile oak (Quercus petraea), downy oak (Quercus pubescens), pedunculate oak (Quercus robur) and northern red oak (Quercus rubra).

Similar species

- At the tip of a twig the swelling of Andricus curvator has an interior cavity that is spherical or oval, compared with the sexual gall of A. inflator where the interior is long and narrow.
- Andricus quercusramuli is egg-shaped, smaller than the asexual gall of A. inflator, up to 3.5 mm long and also matures in the autumn.
- Andricus infectorius asexual gall is similar with a 10–20 mm swelling when mature in October, falling from the tree during the winter. The colour varies from green to dark brown as it matures.

== Distribution ==
The wasp is found in Europe from Ireland to Ukraine.
