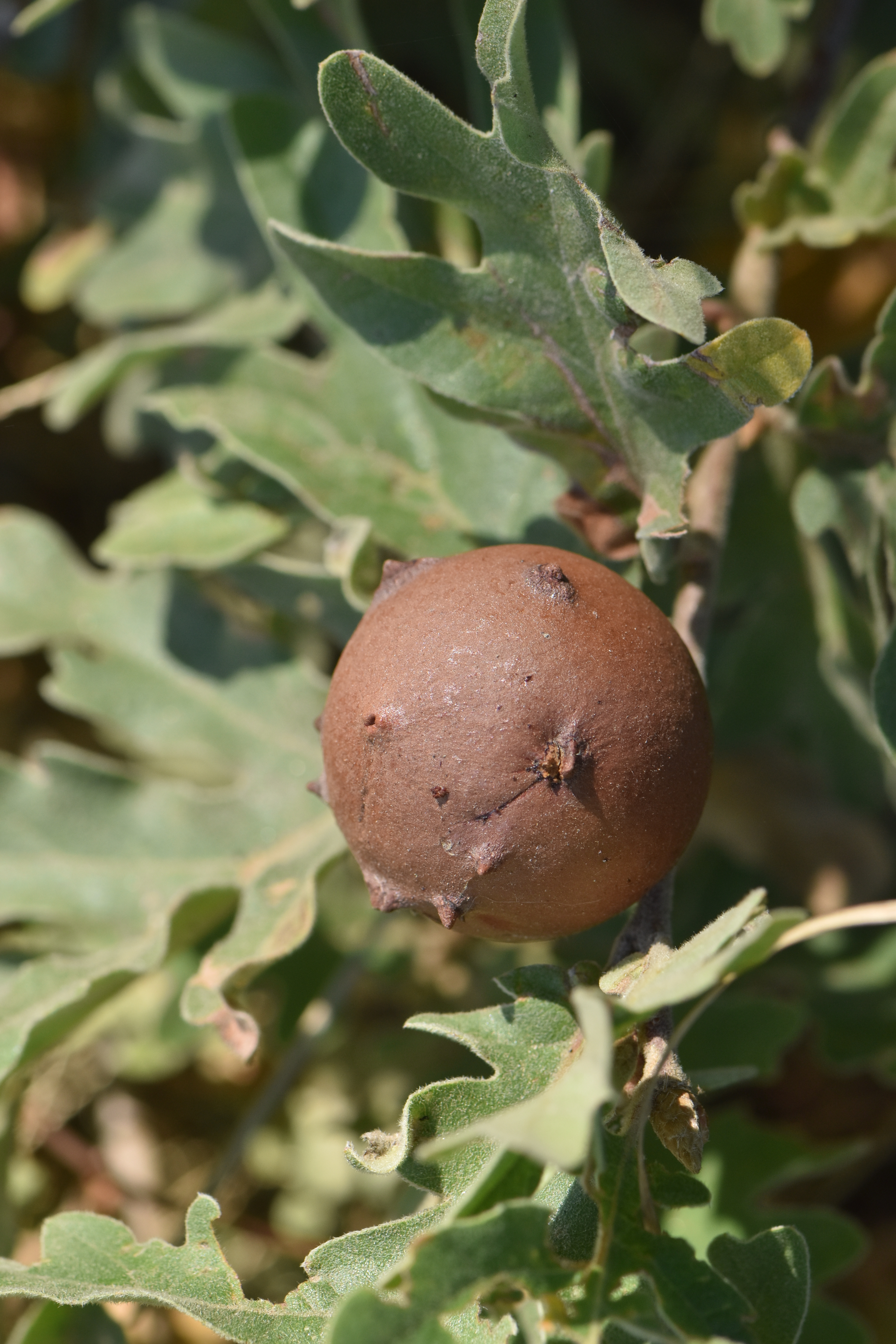
- Mature gall

Scientific classification
- Kingdom: Animalia
- Phylum: Arthropoda
- Clade: Pancrustacea
- Class: Insecta
- Order: Hymenoptera
- Family: Cynipidae
- Genus: Andricus
- Species: A. quercustozae

Binomial name
- Andricus quercustozae (Bosc, 1792)

= Andricus quercustozae =

Species of wasp

Andricus quercustozae is a species of gall wasp found in the Mediterranean region. The species induces large round sticky galls on oaks. The species is associated with many parasitoids, inquilines, and other species which use the galls after the adult host wasp has emerged.

== Description ==
Andricus quercustozae has a heterogonic life cycle with an asexual and a sexual generation. The sexual generation induces cryptic bud galls on section Cerris oaks. In particular, these are Turkey oak (Quercus cerris) in the eastern half of its range (southern France to Anatolia) and cork oak (Q. suber) in the west (Iberian Peninsula and southern France). The asexual generation creates large round galls from the axillary buds of shoots on various species of sect. Quercus oaks, including Quercus faginea, Q. frainetto, Q. pubescens, Q. petraea, Q. pyrenaica and Q. infectoria. The young galls start out as flat disks with marginal projections. These young galls are a reddish to yellowish colour and possess a sticky surface. As the gall matures, it swells into a spherical shape, leaving the marginal projections as a crown of thorns/warts on the top. The final diameter of the gall ranges from 17 to 40 mm. The inside of the gall often contains an internal airspace and the developing host lives in an isolated larval chamber. The asexual generation overwinters within these galls.

== Ecology ==
Andricus quercustozae supports many other species by providing food to natural enemies, and providing habitat to other arthropod species which nest in tree cavities.

=== Parasitoids ===
A. quercustozae is the host for multiple parasitoids, particularly wasps in the superfamily Chalcidoidea. Parasitoids have been reared from these galls from the following families: Megastigmidae, Torymidae, Ormyridae, Eurytomidae, Eulophidae, Eupelmidae, and Chalcididae.

=== Inquilines ===
Other species occupy space in the developing galls alongside the host larvae. These include other cynipid species in the tribe Synergini (e.g. Synergus umbraculus), and tortricid moths (e.g. Pammene amygdalana).

=== Other species ===
Galls induced by A. quercustozae can remain on trees for many years after the host has emerged. Vacant galls serve as a nesting resource for many cavity-nesting species such as arboreal ants (e.g. Crematogaster scutellaris), bees (e.g. Pseudoanthidium nanum), and their parasites.
