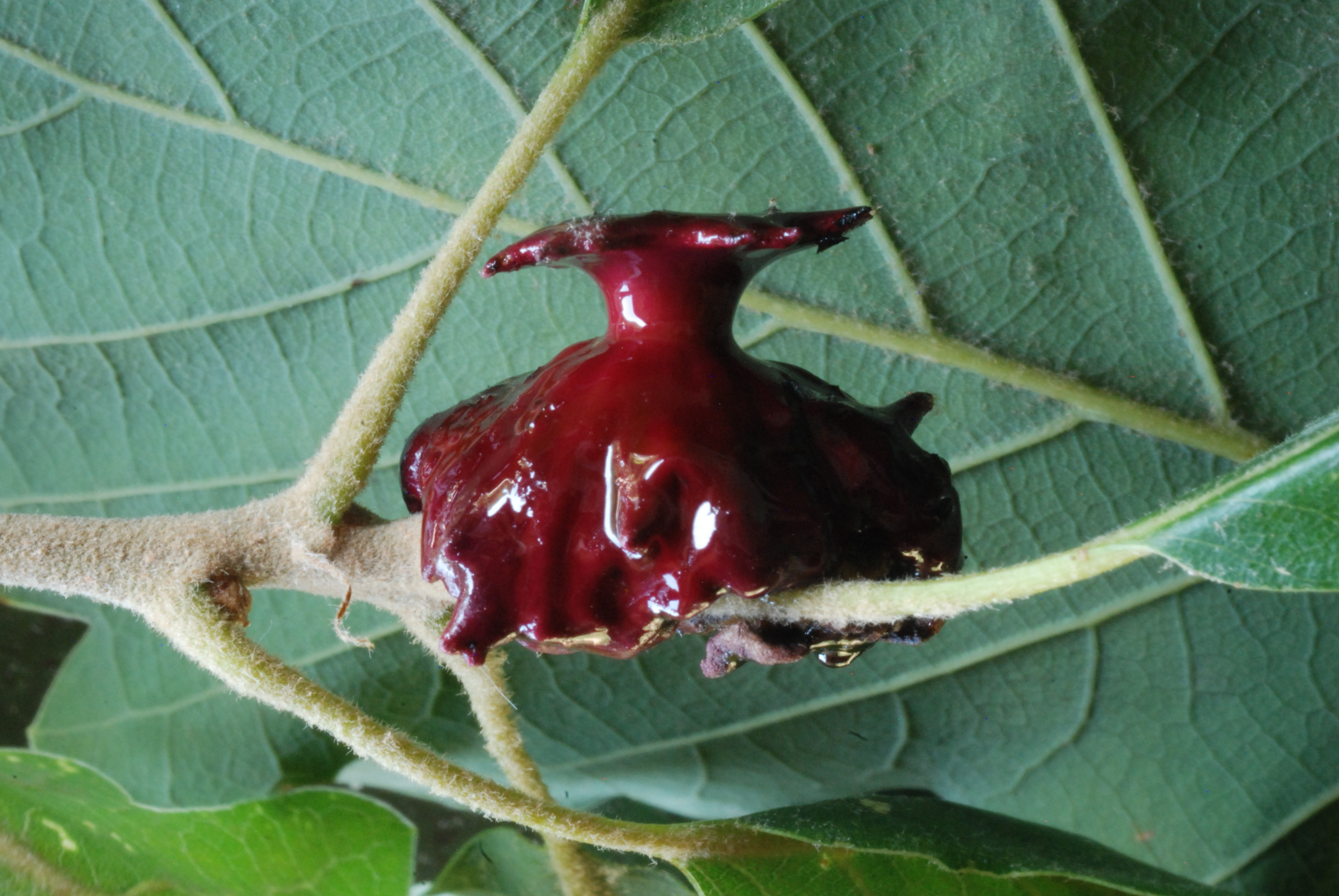
- Mature gall on Quercus pyrenaica
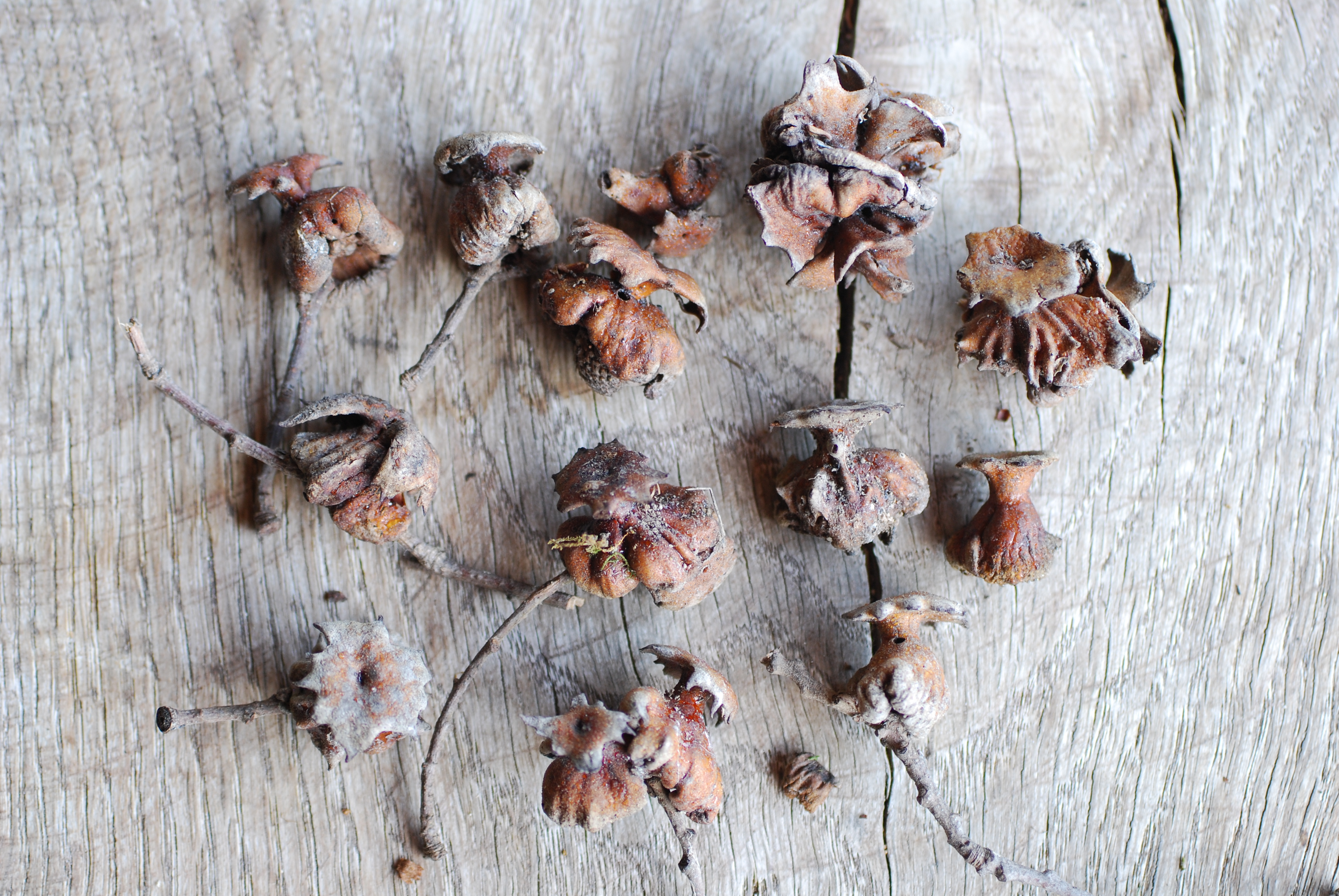
- The previous year's galls

Scientific classification
- Domain: Eukaryota
- Kingdom: Animalia
- Phylum: Arthropoda
- Class: Insecta
- Order: Hymenoptera
- Family: Cynipidae
- Genus: Andricus
- Species: A. dentimitratus

Binomial name
- Andricus dentimitratus (Rejtö, 1887)

= Andricus dentimitratus =

Species of wasp

Andricus dentimitratus is a gall forming wasp in the genus Andricus. The adults lay their eggs on various species of oak and the developing larvae causes the trees to create a large ornate gall. The oaks parasitised include Quercus frainetto, Q. petraea, Q. pyrenaica, Q. pubescens and Q. robur. The gall is formed out of the cup of the acorn. In cross-section it resembles a mushroom. It is woody, maroon, shiny and sticky. It grows up to 25 mm high and 20 mm wide. What resembles the head of the mushroom is lobed or toothed in various ways. The insect emerges from the narrowing, between the head and base.

== Lifecycle ==
Many species of Andricus including A. dentimitratus have a complex lifecyle. There is an agamic stage that produces only parthenocarpic females and a sexual stage where males are also produced. The agamic stage produces the large galls illustrated, however, although the sexual stage is known to occur, the galls of this stage have not been described for A. dentimitratus.

== Distribution ==
It is found around the Mediterranean where suitable host species live, in countries such as Spain, southern France, Hungary, Italy, Slovakia & Turkey.
