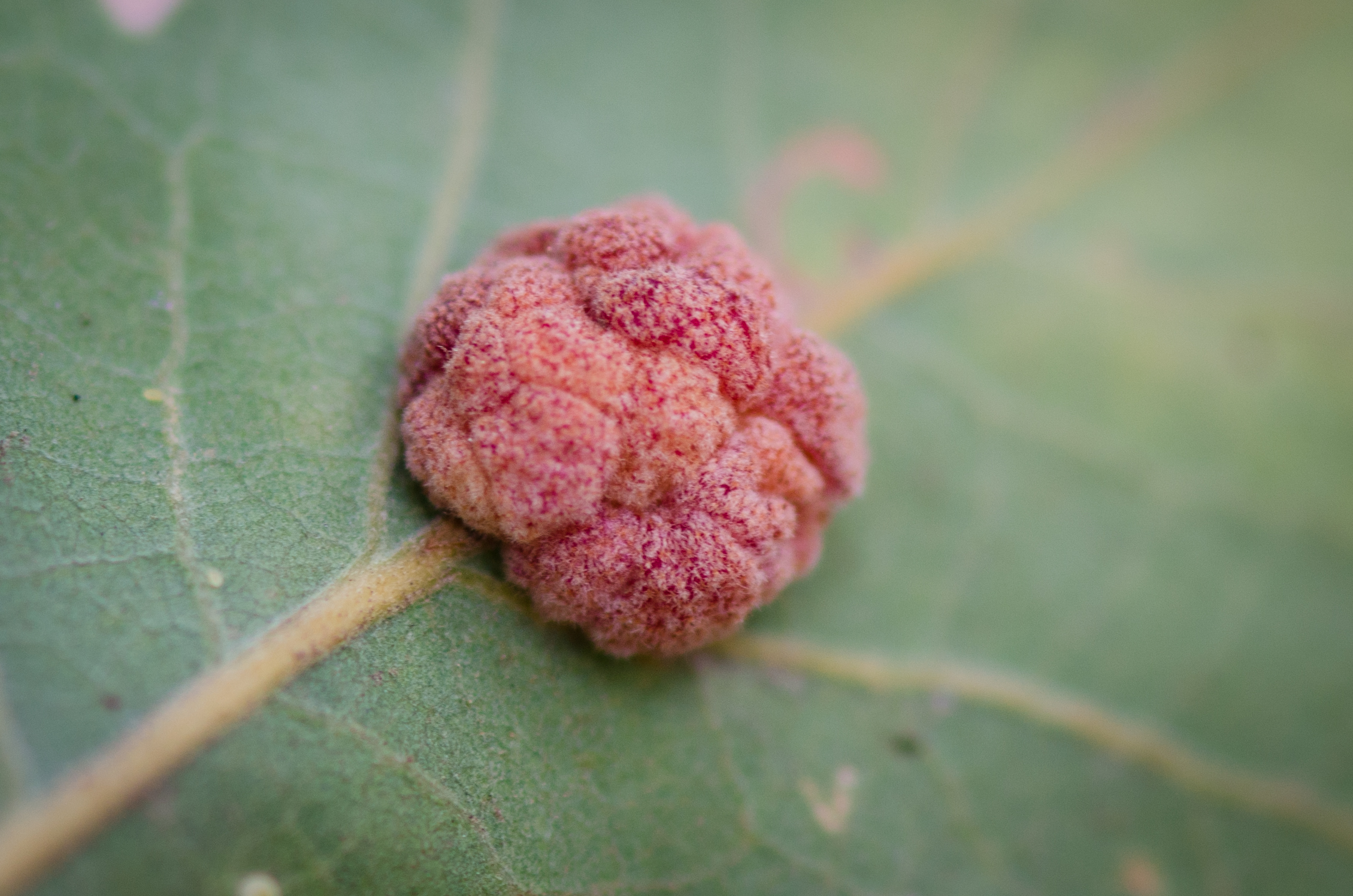
- Castle Rock Regional Recreation Area, Walnut Creek, California, 2013

Scientific classification
- Kingdom: Animalia
- Phylum: Arthropoda
- Class: Insecta
- Order: Hymenoptera
- Family: Cynipidae
- Genus: Andricus
- Species: A. confertus

Binomial name
- Andricus confertus McCracken & Egbert, 1922

= Andricus confertus =

North American gall-inducing wasp

Andricus confertus, the convoluted gall wasp, is a fairly common species of cynipid wasp that produces galls on oak trees in California in North America. This gall, with its pink, brain-like appearance, is actually a cluster of galls. In summer, parthenogenetic female larvae induce these galls on the underside of valley oak leaves, along the midrib. Adult wasps emerge the following spring. These adult females are brown with lighter markings, and are 2.5 millimetres (0.098 in) in length.
