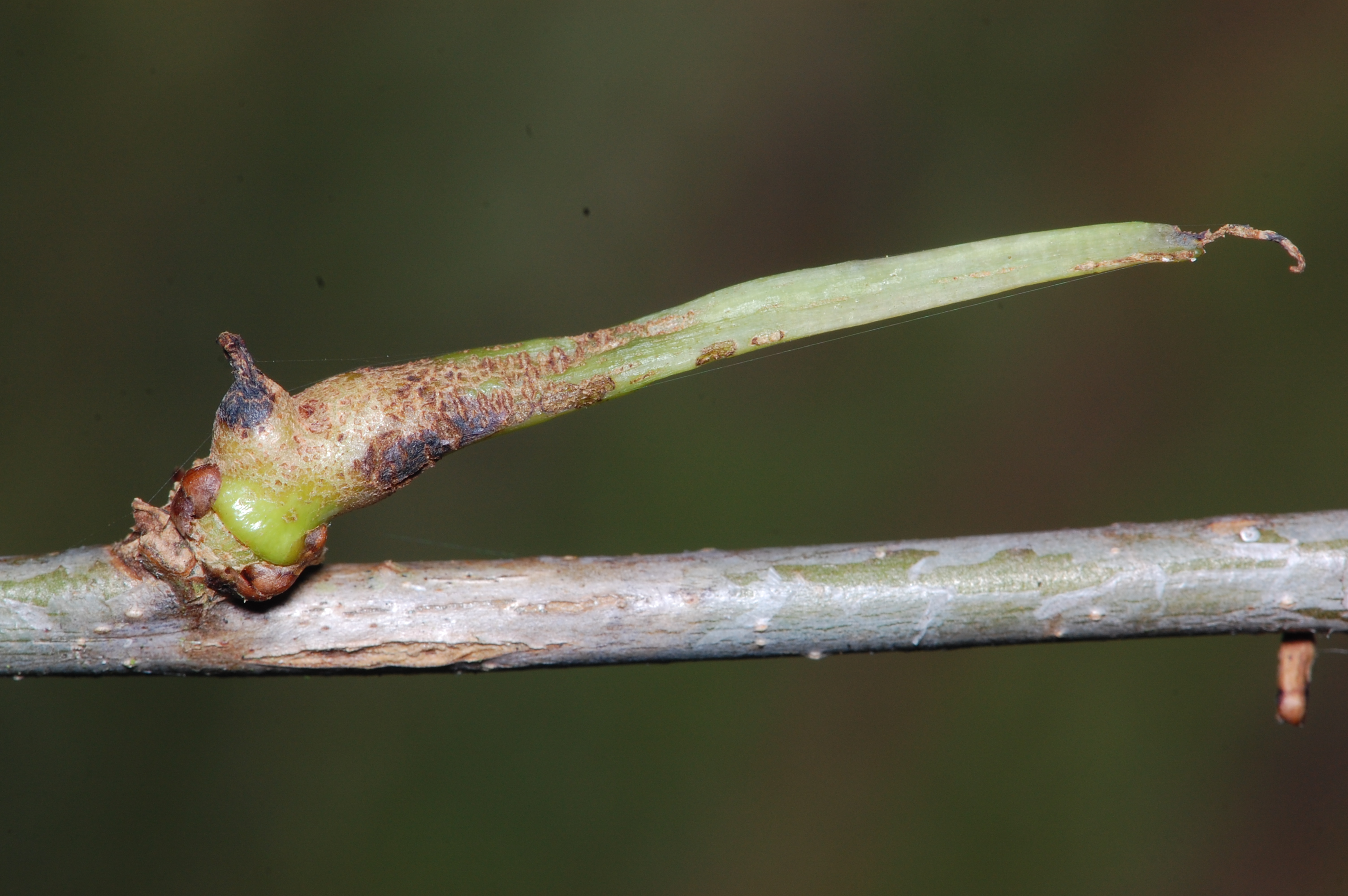
- A. aries gall photographed in England in September.

Scientific classification
- Domain: Eukaryota
- Kingdom: Animalia
- Phylum: Arthropoda
- Class: Insecta
- Order: Hymenoptera
- Family: Cynipidae
- Genus: Andricus
- Species: A. aries

Binomial name
- Andricus aries Giraud, 1859

= Andricus aries =

Species of wasp

Andricus aries is a species of gall-forming wasps, in the genus Andricus. The species was named by the French entomologist Joseph-Étienne Giraud, in 1859. It is commonly found in eastern Europe and during the 21st century has spread to western Europe.

== Description ==
Adults lay their eggs on various species of oak, including Quercus robur, Q. petraea, Q. pubescens and Q. cerris, The developing larvae cause the trees to create an elongated gall, reminiscent of a ram's horn, hence the epithet aries and the vernacular name "ram's horn gall wasp". Green at first, the gall can be reduced to a single strap or can just be 5 mm long. It later hardens, turns brown and is especially variable when the gall contains inquilines (Synergus species). A. aries does not cause galls to form on acorns but causes galls to develop on leaf buds on twigs, these have a variety of forms which are due to the activities of parasites and inquilines. Its sexual stage is found on the catkins of Evergreen Oak In northwestern Europe, at least, their reproduction is solely asexual generation, however, experiments have demonstrated that newly emerged females will lay eggs in the axillary buds of Quercus cerris. A. aries has been found, like other species of gall wasp which have colonised the British Isles, to have been utilised by native parasitoids since their arrival, and that their parasitoids from continental Europe have not followed them across the English Channel.

== Distribution ==
It is found primarily in eastern Europe, but in the 21st century has spread to western Europe including the United Kingdom. If was first recorded in Maidenhead Thicket, Berkshire in 1997 and since then has spread all over the southern half of England.
