= Andricus infectorius =

Scientific classification
- Domain: Eukaryota
- Kingdom: Animalia
- Phylum: Arthropoda
- Class: Insecta
- Order: Hymenoptera
- Family: Cynipidae
- Genus: Andricus
- Species: A. infectorius

Binomial name
- Andricus infectorius (Hartig, 1843)

Species of wasp

Andricus infectorius is a species of gall-forming wasp. The species was named by the German biologist Theodor Hartig, in 1843 and is found in Europe.

== Description of the gall ==
The asexual generation is a 10–20 mm spherical gall, found from late-May through to October when it matures. Found on the terminal bud of a branch, it is initially green and as it matures darkens to dark brown; falling to the ground in the winter. The gall is found on Hungarian oak (Quercus frainetto), sessile oak (Quercus petraea), downy oak (Quercus pubescens) and pedunculate oak (Quercus robur).

Oak gall wasps often have two generations per cycle, with one sexual and one asexual; each creating different galls. According to Milan Zúbrik et al. (2013), the sexual generation of the gall is unknown, but likely to be on Turkey oak (Quercus cerris). A very small, ovoid gall on the catkins of Turkey oak may be the sexual generation.

== Distribution ==
This species has been found in some western and central European countries but is absent from Belgium, Germany, Spain and Switzerland. It has recently been found in Great Britain. A 2013 gall found on Trengwainton Carn, near Penzance, Cornwall was initially identified as Andricus inflator. According to Dr C Leach of the British Plant Gall Society, it is more likely to be A. infectorius.
