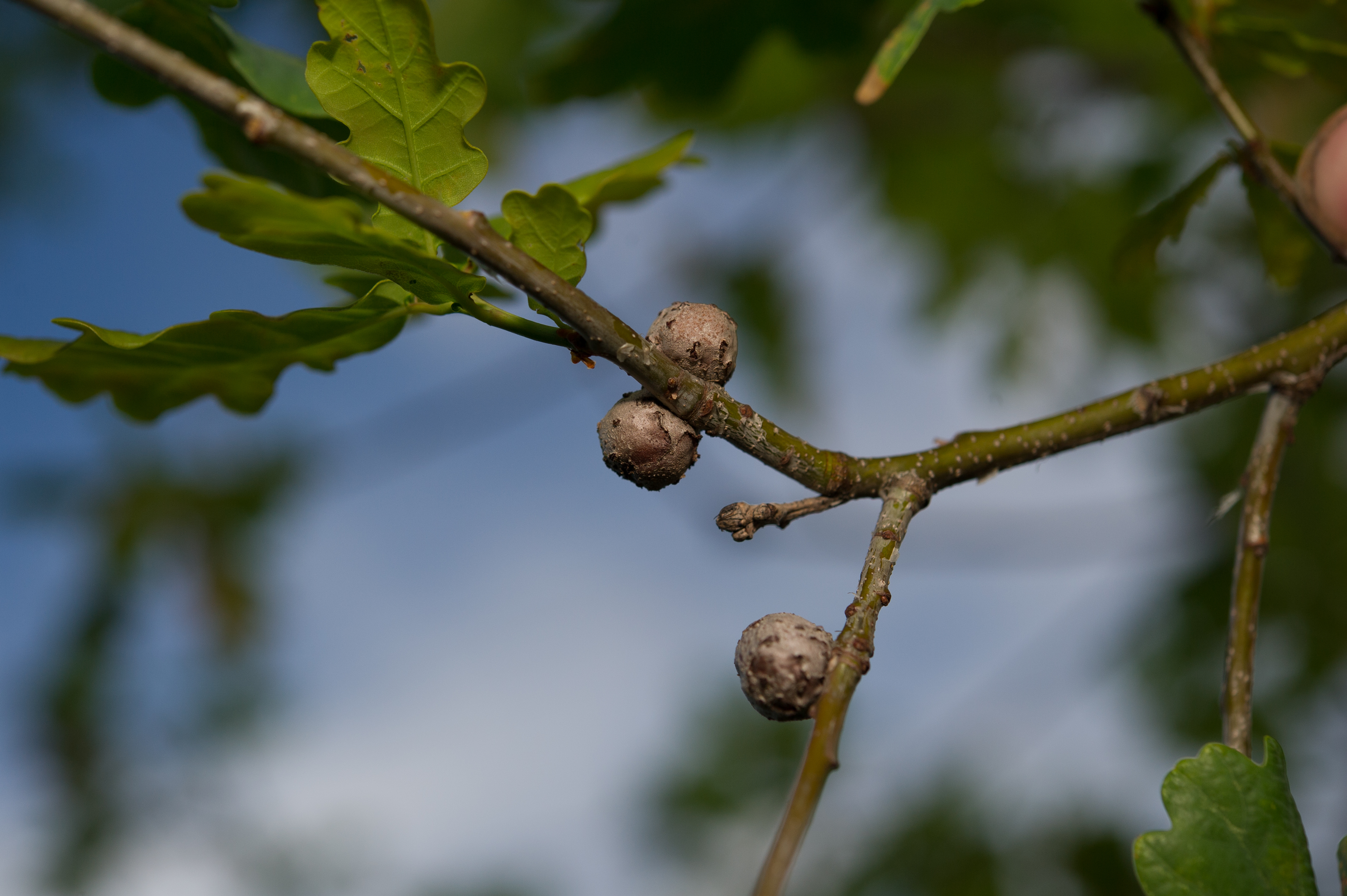
- Galls

Scientific classification
- Kingdom: Animalia
- Phylum: Arthropoda
- Clade: Pancrustacea
- Class: Insecta
- Order: Hymenoptera
- Family: Cynipidae
- Genus: Andricus
- Species: A. corruptrix

Binomial name
- Andricus corruptrix (Schlechtendal, 1870)

= Andricus corruptrix =

Species of wasp

Andricus corruptrix is a species of gall-forming wasp, in the genus Andricus. It is found in Europe.

== Life cycle ==
Adults lay their eggs on the buds of various species of oak, including common oak (Quercus robur), sessile oak (Q. petraea), downy oak (Q. pubescens), Algerian oak (Q. canariensis), chestnut oak (Q. montana) and Turkey oak (Q. cerris).

The galls of the asexual generation are up to 5 mm across, hard and woody and have one to five smooth rounded lobes. They first appear in late summer but do not mature until the following July when the adult insects emerge. Females lay their eggs on the buds of Turkey oak and the galls develop during late winter. This is the gall of the sexual generation which is pale green at first, thin-walled and as they mature, they become tinged with pink and later turn orange-brown. Mature sexual galls are about 2.5 mm long, egg-shaped with a pointed tip and can resemble the mature galls of Andricus kollari.

== Distribution ==
The gall is found in Europe from Ireland to Ukraine excluding Scandinavia and the Iberian Peninsula.
