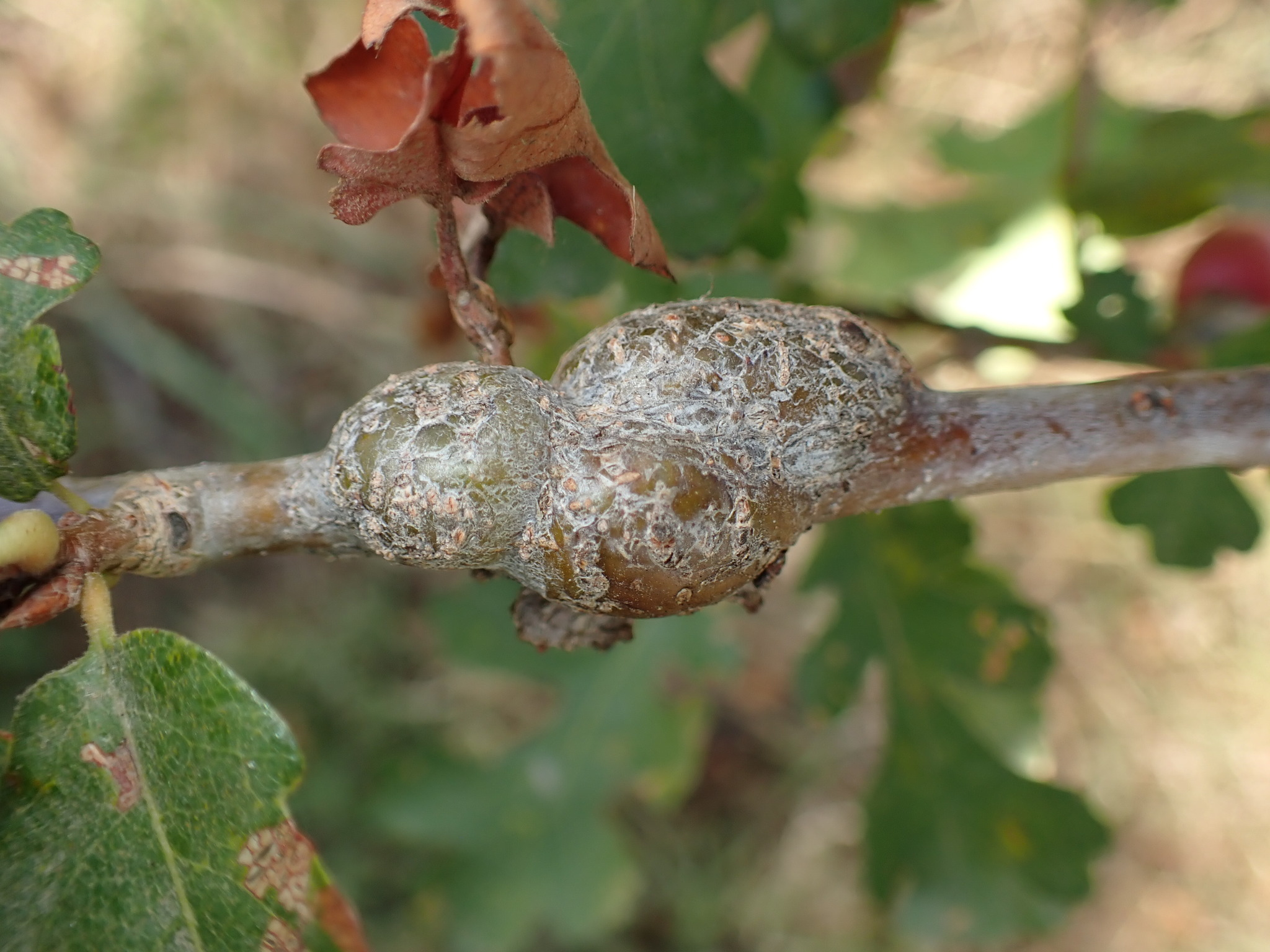
- Irregular spindle gall on valley oak

Scientific classification
- Kingdom: Animalia
- Phylum: Arthropoda
- Class: Insecta
- Order: Hymenoptera
- Family: Cynipidae
- Genus: Andricus
- Species: A. chrysolepidicola

Binomial name
- Andricus chrysolepidicola Ashmead, 1896

= Andricus chrysolepidicola =

Gall-inducing wasp

Andricus chrysolepidicola , also known as the irregular-spindle gall wasp, is a species of cynipid wasp that induces stem galls on blue oaks, valley oaks, scrub oaks, and leather oaks in North America. The stem galls are the first-year unisexual gall of this species; a second-year bisexual generation induces bud galls. This species is primarily known from California but may found elsewhere along the Pacific coast and inland to Nevada.
