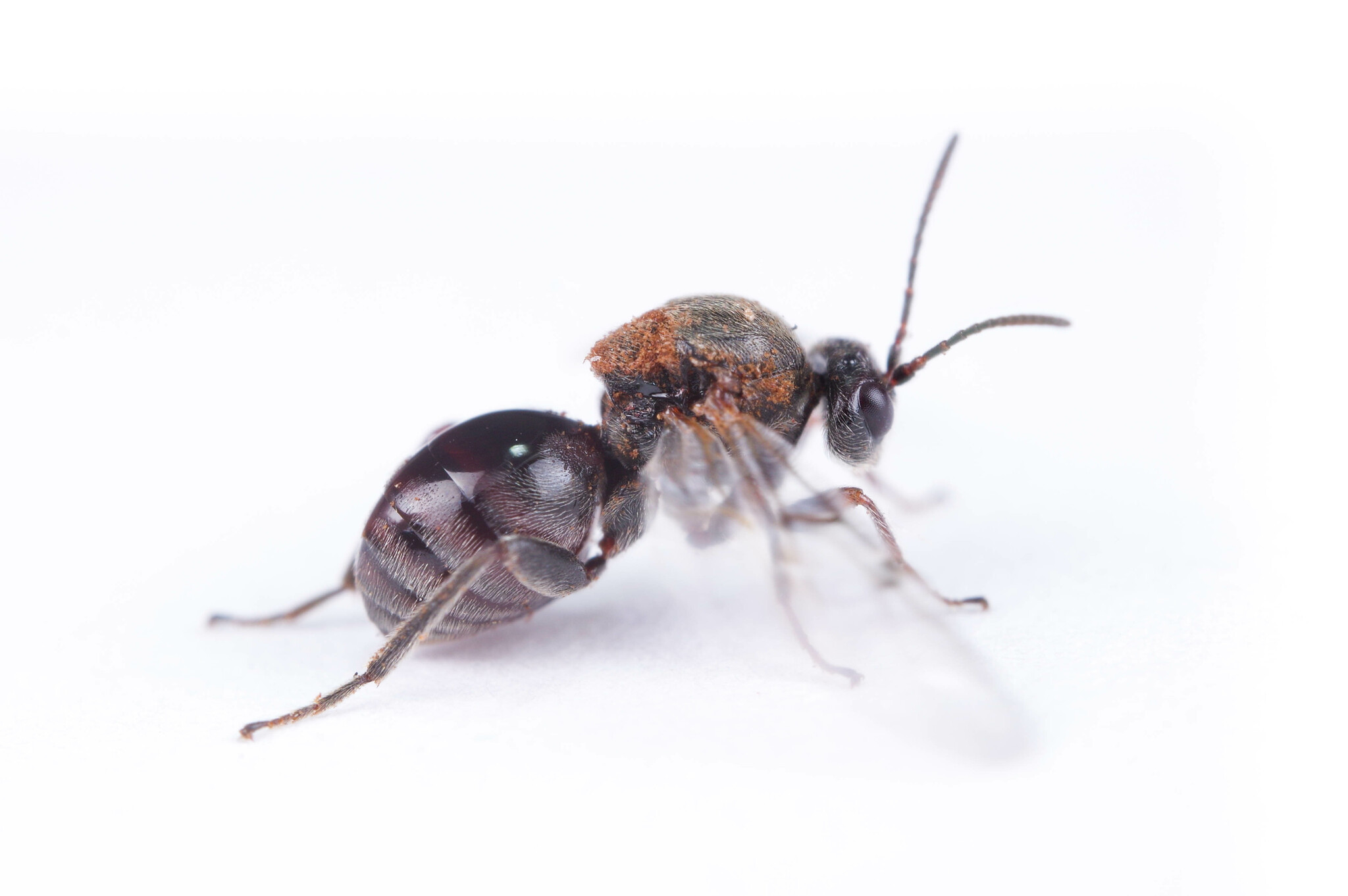

Scientific classification
- Kingdom: Animalia
- Phylum: Arthropoda
- Clade: Pancrustacea
- Class: Insecta
- Order: Hymenoptera
- Family: Cynipidae
- Genus: Andricus
- Species: A. quercusstrobilanus

Binomial name
- Andricus quercusstrobilanus (Osten-Sacken, 1862)

Synonyms
- Adleria quercusstrobilana; Adleria strobilana; Cynips strobilana

= Andricus quercusstrobilanus =

Species of wasp

Andricus quercusstrobilanus, the lobed oak gall wasp, is a species of gall wasp in the family Cynipidae, found in North America. The quercus in its specific name is the genus name for oak, while "strobilus" is derived from the Greek strobilo which means "cone", a reference to the cone shape of the gall; thus the gall is sometimes called pine cone oak gall.

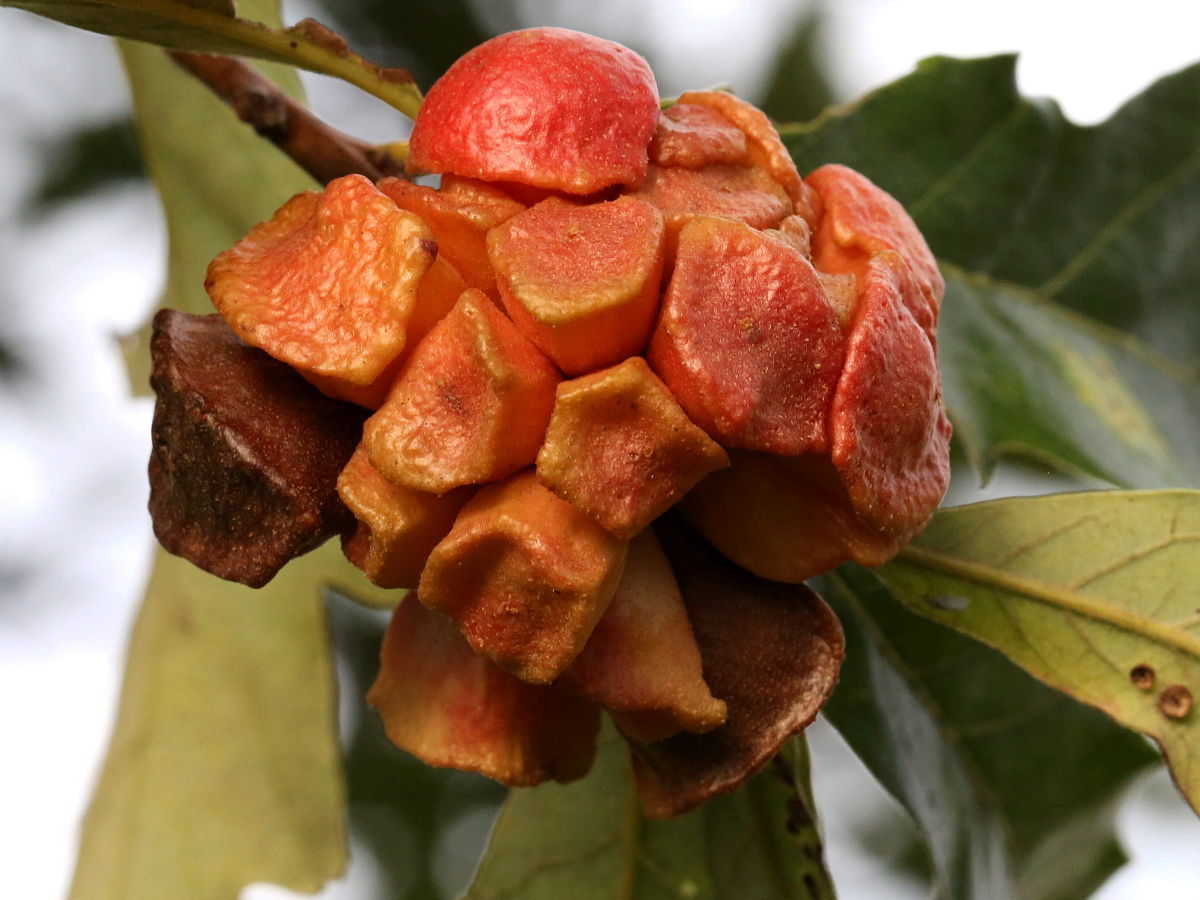
Pine cone oak galls

== Description ==
Larvae induce a cluster of wedge-shaped galls on white oaks, including bur oak, swamp white oak, and overcup oak. The galls are irregular, cone-shaped bodies that are closely packed together, with their pointed bases attached to a common centre. These wedges are hard and corky and break off very easily when the gall is dry. Each of them contains a hollow kernel with a plump, large larva inside. The galls undergo color change from pink or red to yellow and finally to brown.

Adults of the species have not been described.

== Ecology ==
Guest wasps found in the galls include inquilines such as Synergus lignicola (Cynipidae) and parasitoids such as Eurytoma sp. (Eurytomidae).
