= Andricus quercusfoliatus =

Scientific classification
- Kingdom: Animalia
- Phylum: Arthropoda
- Clade: Pancrustacea
- Class: Insecta
- Order: Hymenoptera
- Family: Cynipidae
- Genus: Andricus
- Species: A. quercusfoliatus

Binomial name
- Andricus quercusfoliatus (Ashmead, 1881)

Species of wasp

Andricus quercusfoliatus, the leafy oak gall wasp, is a species of gall wasp in the family Cynipidae.
