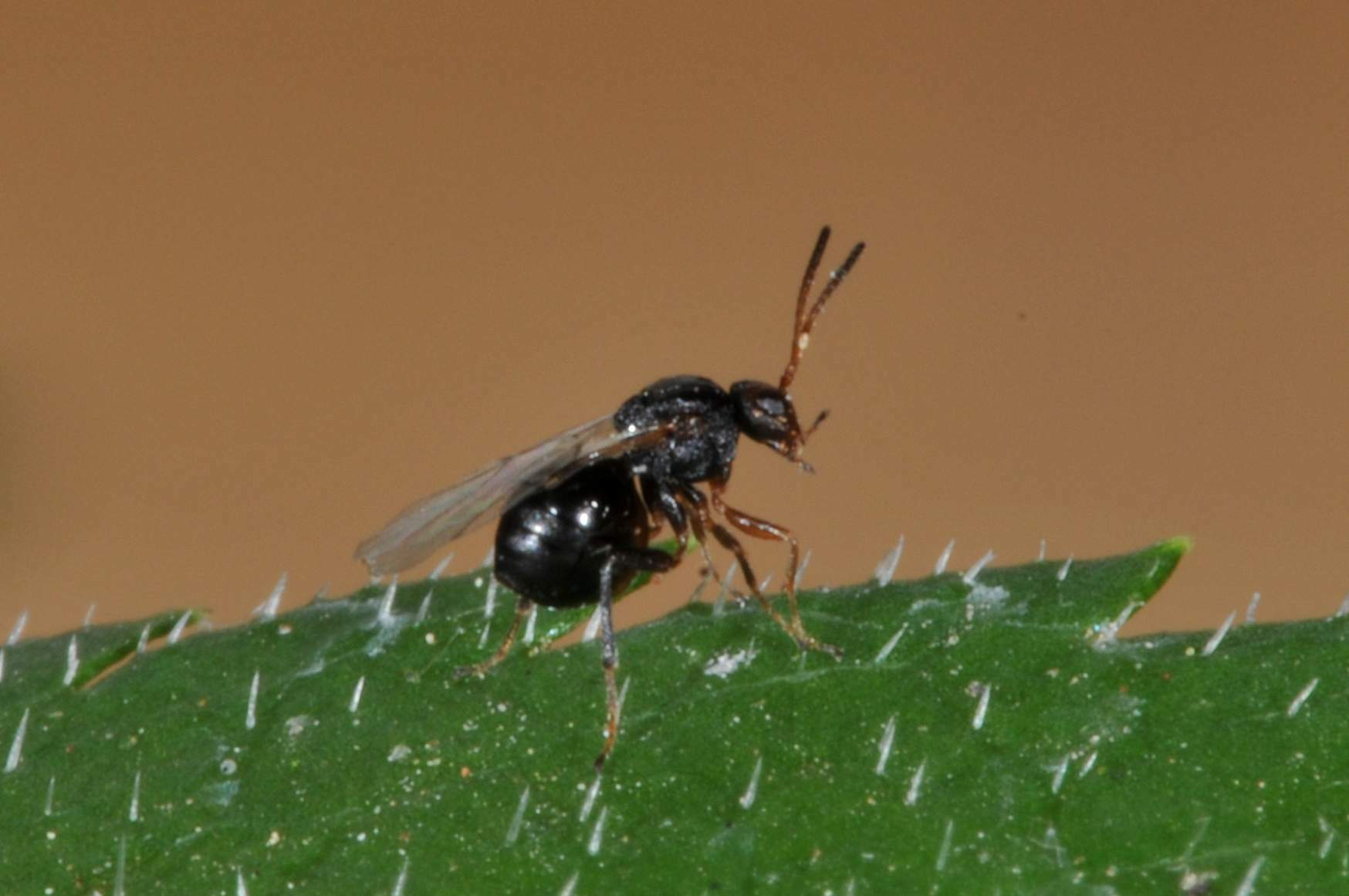
- Andricus quercusradicis

Scientific classification
- Kingdom: Animalia
- Phylum: Arthropoda
- Clade: Pancrustacea
- Class: Insecta
- Order: Hymenoptera
- Family: Cynipidae
- Tribe: Cynipini
- Genus: Andricus; Hartig, 1840

Type species
- Andricus noduli Hartig, 1840

Synonyms
- Aphilotrix Foerster, 1869; Manderstjernia Radoskowsky, 1866; Oncaspis Dettmer, 1925; Euschmitzia Dettmer, 1925; Conobius Kinsey, 1938; Adleria Rohwer & Fagan, 1917; Erythres Kinsey, 1937; Parandricus Kieffer, 1906; Trichoteras Ashmead, 1897

= Andricus =

Genus of wasps

Andricus is a genus of oak gall wasps in the family Cynipidae.

== Life cycle ==
As in all Hymenoptera, sex-determination in species of the genus Andricus is governed by haplodiploidy: males develop from unfertilized eggs and are haploid, and females develop from fertilized eggs and are diploid.

Many species in the genus alternate between an asexual generation and a sexual generation.

== Species ==
The taxonomy of the genus Andricus is uncertain, with many of the approximately 375 species considered dubious. The following species are currently recognised in the genus Andricus:

- Andricus aciculatus Beutenmuller, 1909
- Andricus ahmeti Melika, Mutun & Dinç, 2014
- Andricus albipes Hartig, 1840
- Andricus albobalani Weld, 1926
- Andricus alniensis Folliot, 1964
- Andricus amblycerus (Giraud, 1859)
- Andricus amenti Giraud, 1859
- Andricus analis (Fonscolombe, 1832)
- Andricus anatolicus Melika, Mutun & Dinç, 2014
- Andricus archiboldi Melika & Abrahamson, 2021
- Andricus aries (Girauld, 1859)
- Andricus arslani Azmaz & Katılmış, 2022
- Andricus assarehi Melika & Sadeghi, 2008
- Andricus atkinsonae Melika, Stone, Sadeghi & Zargaran, 2008
- Andricus bakrachus Melika, Mutun & Dinç, 2014
- Andricus balanaspis (Weld, 1922)
- Andricus balanella (Weld, 1957)
- Andricus barriosi Medianero & Nieves-Aldrey, 2019
- Andricus biconicus Weld, 1959
- Andricus bimaculatus (Schenck, 1863)
- Andricus brachycentrus (Thomson, 1877)
- Andricus breviramuli Pujade-Villar, 2014
- Andricus brunneus Fullaway, 1911 — clustered gall wasp
- Andricus bulgaricus Vasileva-Symnalieva, 1978
- Andricus burgundus Giraud, 1859
- Andricus burnetti Dailey & Sprenger, 1983
- Andricus caliciformis (Giraud, 1859)
- Andricus californicus Ashmead, 1885
- Andricus callidoma (Hartig, 1841)
- Andricus capillatus (Weld, 1927)
- Andricus caputmedusae (Hartig, 1843)
- Andricus catalinensis Melika, Nicholls & Stone, 2021
- Andricus catilla (Darboux & Houard, 1907)
- Andricus cecconii Kieffer, 1901
- Andricus chapmanii Melika & Abrahamson, 2021
- Andricus chico Weld, 1957
- Andricus chinquapin (Fitch, 1859) — small oak spindle gall wasp
- Andricus chiricahuensis Melika, Nicholls & Stone, 2021
- Andricus chodjaii Melika, 2008
- Andricus chrysolepidicola Ashmead, 1896 — irregular spindle gall wasp
- Andricus cinnamomeus Ashmead, 1887
- Andricus clementinae (Giraud, 1859)
- Andricus coconinoensis Melika, Nicholls & Stone, 2021
- Andricus columbiensis Melika, Nicholls & Stone, 2021
- Andricus comata Weld, 1956
- Andricus confusus Lobato-Vila & Pujade-Villar, 2019
- Andricus confertus McCracken & Egbert, 1922 — convoluted gall wasp
- Andricus conglomeratus (Girauld, 1859)
- Andricus conificus (Hartig, 1843)
- Andricus cooki Melika, Nicholls & Stone, 2021
- Andricus coortus Weld, 1947 — club gall wasp
- Andricus coquilletti (Ashmead, 1897) - little oak apple gall wasp
- Andricus coriariformis Melika, Challis & Stone, 2008
- Andricus coriarius (Hartig, 1843)
- Andricus coronatus (Girauld, 1859)
- Andricus coronus Beutenmueller, 1907
- Andricus corruptrix (Schlechtendal, 1870)
- Andricus costaricensis Pujade-Villar & Melika, 2018
- Andricus costatus Weld, 1944
- Andricus crassicornis (Curtis, 1838)
- Andricus crispator Tschek, 1871
- Andricus cryptobius Wachtl, 1880
- Andricus csokai Melika & Tavakoli, 2008
- Andricus curtisii (Muller, 1870)
- Andricus curvator (Hartig, 1840)
- Andricus cydoniae Giraud, 1859
- Andricus deciduatus Weld, 1926
- Andricus dentimitratus (Rejtö, 1887)
- Andricus dimorphus (Beutenmuller, 1913) — clustered midrib gall wasp
- Andricus discalis (Weld, 1927)
- Andricus exclusus (Ratzeburg, 1844)
- Andricus fidelensis Kieffer, 1901
- Andricus fitzpatricki Melika & Abrahamson, 2021
- Andricus flavicornis Schenck, 1863
- Andricus flavus Pujade-Villar, Wang, Guo & Chen, 2014
- Andricus floridus Tavares, 1918
- Andricus foecundatrix (Hartig, 1840)
- Andricus flavohirtus Beutenmüller, 1913
- Andricus foliaformis Weld, 1927
- Andricus formosalis Weld, 1947
- Andricus formosanus Tang & Melika, 2009
- Andricus forni Pujade-Villar & Nicholls, 2020
- Andricus frondeum (Weld, 1957)
- Andricus fulviventris Schenck, 1863
- Andricus furnaceus Kinsey, 1920
- Andricus fuscicornis Hartig, 1841
- Andricus galeatus (Girauld, 1859)
- Andricus gallaecus Tavares, 1916
- Andricus gallaetinctoriae (Olivier, 1791)
- Andricus gallaeurnaeformis (Boyer de Fonscolombe, 1832)
- Andricus gemmeus (Giraud, 1859)
- Andricus gemmicola Kieffer, 1901
- Andricus geniculatus (Dufour, 1864)
- Andricus giardina Stefani, 1898
- Andricus glandulae (Hartig, 1840)
- Andricus glutinosus (Girauld, 1859)
- Andricus gracilicornis (Kieffer, 1900)
- Andricus grossulariae (Giraud, 1859)
- Andricus hartigi (Hartig, 1843)
- Andricus hastata (Kinsey, 1937)
- Andricus hedwigia (Kustenmacher, 1894)
- Andricus highlandensis Melika, Nicholls & Stone, 2021
- Andricus hispanicus (Hartig, 1856)
- Andricus howertoni Bassett, 1890
- Andricus hungaricus (Hartig, 1843)
- Andricus hyalinus Hartig, 1841
- Andricus hystrix Kieffer, 1897
- Andricus impropius Ballido & Pujade-Villar, 2003
- Andricus incertus Bassett, 1900
- Andricus indistinctus Bassett, 1890
- Andricus infectorius (Hartig, 1843)
- Andricus inflator Hartig, 1840
- Andricus insanus ](Westwood, 1837)
- Andricus istvani Melika, 2008
- Andricus kashiwaphilus Abe, 1998
- Andricus kollari (Hartig, 1843)
- Andricus korlevici Kieffer, 1902
- Andricus laevigatus Schenck, 1863
- Andricus lasius (Ashmead, 1896) - hairy gall wasp
- Andricus lateralis (Hartig, 1840)
- Andricus legitimus Wiebes-Rijks, 1980
- Andricus libani Melika, Challis & Stone, 2008
- Andricus lignicolus (Hartig, 1840)
- Andricus longipennis (Ashmead, 1887)
- Andricus lucidus (Hartig, 1843)
- Andricus luisieri Tavares, 1914
- Andricus luteicornis Kieffer, 1899
- Andricus malpighii (Adler, 1881)
- Andricus mammadovi Azmaz & Katilmis, 2021
- Andricus mamillaformis (Weld, 1926)
- Andricus marmoreus Kinsey, 1920
- Andricus maxwelli Bassett, 1890
- Andricus mayri (Wachtl, 1881)
- Andricus megatruncicolus Melika, 2008
- Andricus melikai Pujade-Villar & Kwast, 2002
- Andricus mellificus Melika, Nicholls & Stone, 2021
- Andricus mendocinensis Weld, 1957
- Andricus menkei Melika & Abrahamson, 2021
- Andricus miriami Shachar, 2015
- Andricus mitratus (Mayr, 1870)
- Andricus mogollonensis Melika, Nicholls & Stone, 2021
- Andricus montezumus Beutenmuller, 1913
- Andricus moniliatus Hartig, 1840
- Andricus moreae (Graeffe, 1905)
- Andricus morula Shachar, Inbar & Dorchin, 2017
- Andricus mukaigawae (Mukaigawa, 1913)
- Andricus multiplicatus (Girauld, 1859)
- Andricus murtfeldtae Ashmead, 1896
- Andricus nichollsi Melika & Stone, 2021
- Andricus niger (Fourcroy, 1785)
- Andricus nigricens (Gillette, 1888)
- Andricus nobrei Tavares, 1901
- Andricus nodifex Kieffer, 1900
- Andricus notholithocarpi Melika, Nicholls & Stone, 2018
- Andricus occultatus (Weld, 1926)
- Andricus octosporifex (Schrank, 1802)
- Andricus opertus (Weld, 1926) — fimbriate gall wasp
- Andricus ostrea (Hartig, 1840)
- Andricus pallidicornis (Curtis, 1838)
- Andricus pallipes (Schenck, 1863)
- Andricus panteli (Kieffer, 1896)
- Andricus paradoxus (Radoszkowski, 1866)
- Andricus partali Pujade-Villar, Cuesta-Porta & Hanson, 2022
- Andricus pedicellatus Kinsey, 1922 — hair stalk gall wasp
- Andricus peredurus (Kinsey, 1920)
- Andricus perfulvum (Weld, 1952)
- Andricus perlentus (Kinsey, 1937)
- Andricus petioli Hartig, 1843
- Andricus pictus (Hartig, 1856)
- Andricus pilula (Bassett, 1890)
- Andricus pilularis Weld, 1952
- Andricus pisiformis Beutenmueller, 1911
- Andricus polycerus (Girauld, 1859)
- Andricus prescotti Weld, 1952
- Andricus projectus Weld, 1952
- Andricus pseudoaries Melika, Stone & Sadegh, 2008
- Andricus pseudocurvator Tang & Melika, 2011
- Andricus pseudoinflator Tavares, 1901
- Andricus pujadevillari Melika, Stone, Sadeghi, Atkinson & Zargaran, 2008
- Andricus quadrilineatus (Hartig, 1840)
- Andricus quercuscalicis (Burgsdorf, 1783) — knopper gall
- Andricus quercuscalifornicus (Bassett, 1881) — California gall wasp
- Andricus quercuscorticis (Linnaeus, 1761)
- Andricus quercusfoliatus (Ashmead, 1881) — leafy oak gall wasp
- Andricus quercusformosus (Bassett, 1864)
- Andricus quercusfrondosus (Bassett, 1865)
- Andricus quercusinferus (Linnaeus, 1767)
- Andricus quercuslaurinus Melika and Pujade-Villar, 2009
- Andricus quercuspetioli (Linnaeus, 1758)
- Andricus quercuspetiolicola Bassett, 1863 — oak petiole gall wasp
- Andricus quercuspyramidalis (Landois, 1895)
- Andricus quercusradicis (Fabricius, 1798)
- Andricus quercusramuli (Linnaeus, 1761)
- Andricus quercussingularis Bassett, 1863 — small oak apple gall wasp
- Andricus quercustozae (Bosc, 1792)
- Andricus quercusstrobilanus (Osten-Sacken, 1862) — lobed oak gall wasp
- Andricus quercusutriculus (Bassett, 1881)
- Andricus reticulatus Bassett, 1890
- Andricus rhizoxenus (Ashmead, 1896)
- Andricus rhyzomae (Hartig, 1843)
- Andricus robustus Weld, 1926
- Andricus rotundula (Weld, 1952)
- Andricus rubripes (Thomson, 1877)
- Andricus ruficornis (Schenck, 1863)
- Andricus rufipes (Fabricius, 1804)
- Andricus rufiventris Schenck, 1863
- Andricus rufus (Thomson, 1877)
- Andricus rugatus Weld, 1926
- Andricus ruginosus Bassett, 1890
- Andricus sadeghii Melika, Stone, Atkinson & Aligolizade, 2008
- Andricus schencki Dalla Torre & Kieffer, 1910
- Andricus schickae Nicholls, Melika & Stone, 2021
- Andricus schoenroggei Melika & Stone, 2008
- Andricus schroeckingeri Wachtl, 1876
- Andricus scutella Weld, 1930
- Andricus seckendorffi (Wachtl, 1879)
- Andricus seminationis (Giraud, 1859)
- Andricus serotinus (Giraud, 1859)
- Andricus serricornis (Kinsey, 1922)
- Andricus sessilum Weld, 1926
- Andricus shuhuti Melika, Mutun & Dinç, 2013
- Andricus sieboldi (Hartig, 1843)
- Andricus singularis Mayr, 1870
- Andricus solitarius (Fonscolombe, 1832)
- Andricus songshui Tang & Melika, 2011
- Andricus sphaericus Pujade-Villar, 2016
- Andricus spicatus (Bassett, 1900)
- Andricus splendens Weld, 1919
- Andricus stefanii (Kieffer, 1897)
- Andricus stellaris Weld, 1926 — sunburst gall wasp
- Andricus stellatus Melika & Tavakoli, 2008
- Andricus stellulus (Burnett, 1974) — stellar gall wasp
- Andricus sternlichti Bellido, Pujade-Villar & Melika, 2003
- Andricus stonei Melika, Tavakoli & Sadeghi, 2014
- Andricus stramineus Weld, 1944
- Andricus stropus Ashmead, 1887
- Andricus strues (Kinsey, 1938)
- Andricus subterranea (Giraud, 1859)
- Andricus sufflator Mayr, 1882
- Andricus sulfureus Weld, 1926
- Andricus superfetationis (Giraud, 1859)
- Andricus surculi (Schrank, 1781)
- Andricus tavaresi Kieffer, 1904
- Andricus testaceipes (Hartig, 1840)
- Andricus testaceus (Gmelin, 1790)
- Andricus texanus Beutenmüller, 1909
- Andricus theophrasteus (Trotter, 1902)
- Andricus tomentosus (Trotter, 1901)
- Andricus torreyaensis Melika & Abrahamson, 2021
- Andricus toumeyi Weld, 1926
- Andricus trotteri Kieffer, 1898
- Andricus truncicola (Girauld, 1859)
- Andricus tubalis Weld, 1926
- Andricus tubularius Weld, 1926
- Andricus tumefaciens Pujade-Villar & Paretas-Martínez, 2014
- Andricus turcicus Melika, Mutun & Dinç, 2014
- Andricus turionum (Hartig, 1840)
- Andricus vacciniifoliae (Ashmead, 1896) — oak apple wasp
- Andricus villosulus (Gravenhorst, 1807)
- Andricus verensis Weld, 1955
- Andricus vindobonensis Müllner, 1901
- Andricus weldi (Beutenmüller, 1918)
- Andricus wheeleri Beutenmueller, 1907
- Andricus williami Melika, Nicholls & Stone, 2021
- Andricus wiltzae Fullaway, 1911
- Andricus zappellai Kieffer, 1901

== Previous species ==
These species were previously grouped in Andricus.

Currently in Druon:

- Druon flocculentum Lyon
- Druon fullawayi Beutenmüller, 1914
- Druon ignotum Bassett
- Druon linaria Kinsey
- Druon pattoni (Bassett, 1881)
- Druon protagion Kinsey
- Druon quercusflocci (Walsh, 1864)
- Druon quercuslanigerum Ashmead

Currently in Feron:

- Feron albicomus (Weld, 1952)
- Feron amphorus (Weld, 1926)
- Feron apiarium (Weld, 1944)
- Feron atrimentum Kinsey, 1922) — striped volcano gall wasp
- Feron bakkeri (Lyon, 1984)
- Feron caepula (Weld, 1926)
- Feron californicum (Beutenmueller, 1911)
- Feron clarkei (Bassett, 1890)
- Feron crystallinum (Bassett, 1900) — crystalline gall wasp
- Feron cylindratum (Kinsey, 1937)
- Feron discularis (Weld, 1926)
- Feron gigas (Kinsey, 1922)—saucer gall wasp
- Feron kingi (Bassett, 1900) — red cone gall wasp
- Feron parmula (Bassett, 1900) — disc gall wasp
- Feron pattersonae Fullaway, 1911 — plate gall wasp
- Feron tecturnarum Kinsey, 1920
- Feron tubifaciens Weld, 1926
