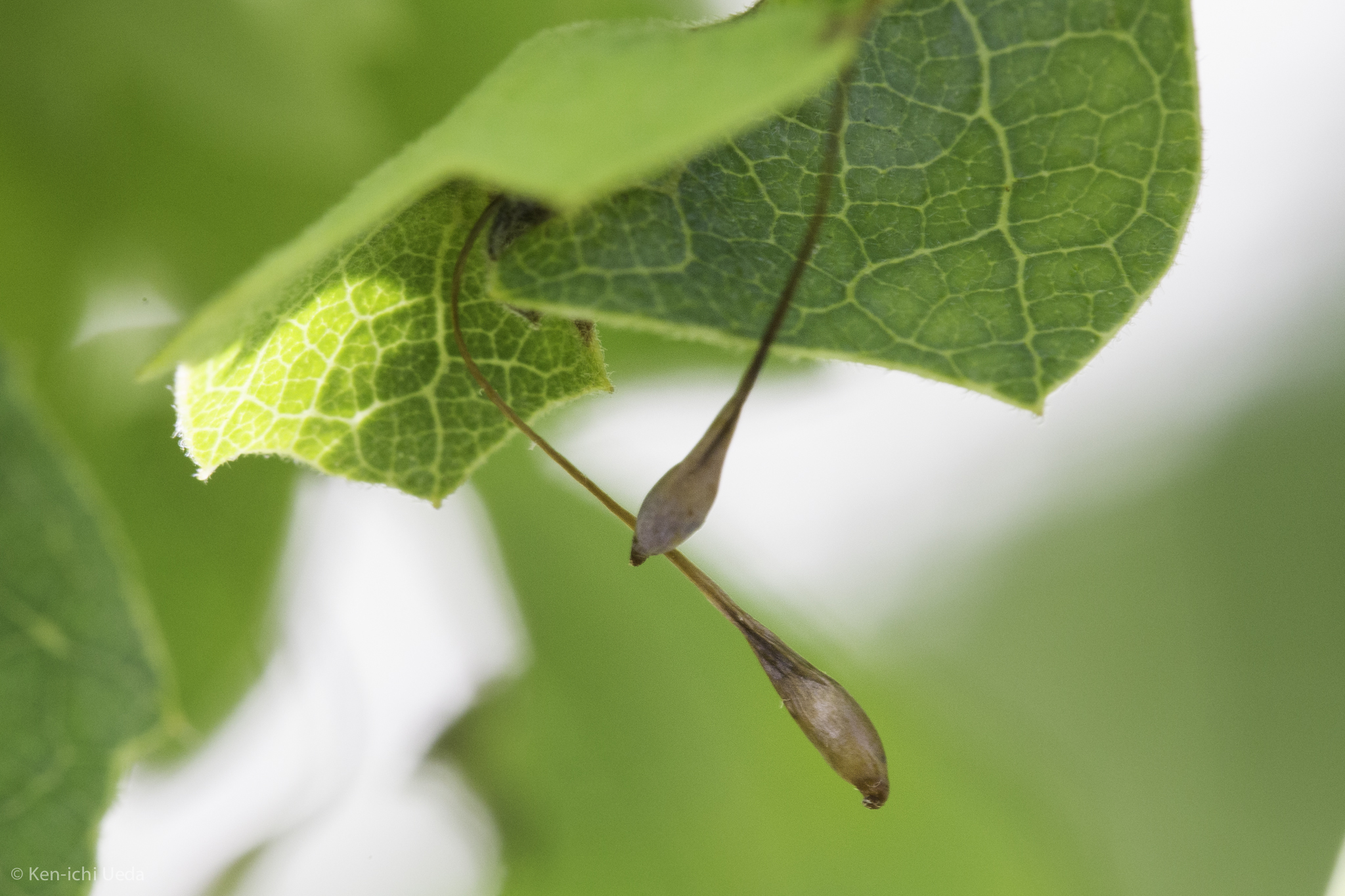
- Hair stalk galls, Mount Diablo State Park, 2018

Scientific classification
- Kingdom: Animalia
- Phylum: Arthropoda
- Class: Insecta
- Order: Hymenoptera
- Family: Cynipidae
- Genus: Andricus
- Species: A. pedicellatus

Binomial name
- Andricus pedicellatus (Kinsey, 1922)

Synonyms
- Dryophanta pedicellata

= Andricus pedicellatus =

North American gall-inducing wasp

Andricus pedicellatus, the hair stalk gall wasp, is a fairly common species of cynipid wasp that produces long spindly leaf galls on blue oaks on the Pacific coast of North America.
