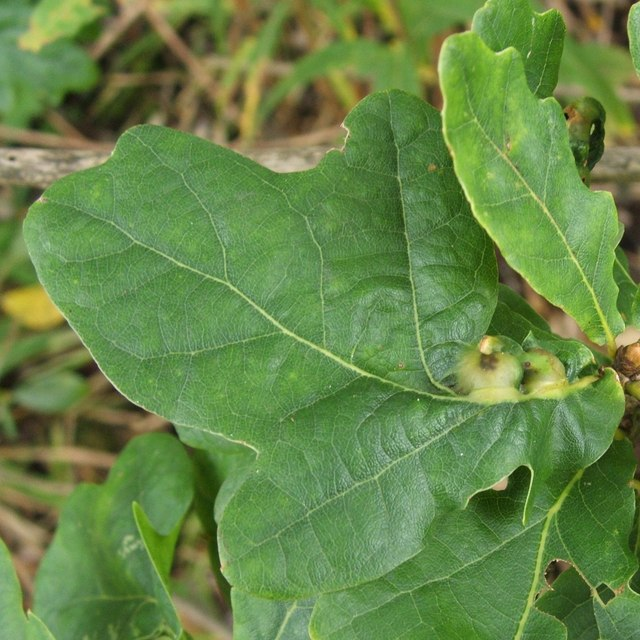

Scientific classification
- Domain: Eukaryota
- Kingdom: Animalia
- Phylum: Arthropoda
- Class: Insecta
- Order: Hymenoptera
- Family: Cynipidae
- Genus: Andricus
- Species: A. curvator

Binomial name
- Andricus curvator (Hartig, 1840)

= Andricus curvator =

Species of wasp

Andricus curvator is a gall wasp which forms chemically induced leaf galls on oak trees and has both agamic and sexual generations. Agamic and sexual generations usually form two distinct galls on oak trees, but in the case of A. curvator there are six galls; the sexual generation usually on the leaf, occasionally in a twig or catkin, and the agamic generation in a bud. The wasp was first described by Theodor Hartig, a German biologist, in 1840 and is found in most of Europe.

== Life cycle ==
Adult gall wasps emerge in the spring, from galls formed on the bud the previous year. The spring generation lay eggs usually on a leaf, occasionally on a twig or on catkins and the leaf galls appear soon after the leaves emerge. They are approximately 8 mm, roughly globular and have thin walls with a small inner gall. They often coalesce and can be clustered near the leaf base where they can cause distortion. Galls on a twig cause the twig to bend and it can also occur at the tip. These galls have an interior cavity which can be spherical or oval. A fourth sexual gall can also develop on the base of a catkin stalk and is up to 5 mm diameter. What remains of the catkin is bent 90° and can still be seen at the tip. The female wasps develop within the gall and emerge in May or June, laying their eggs on a young bud.

Sometimes known as a collared gall the asexual gall is often concealed among the bud scales, and at first, are difficult to find. The scales may fall away, exposing a 3 mm, smooth, brown, skittle-shaped gall with a nipple-like tip, usually surrounded by a pale ring. In old galls the ring may not be seen. The wasp overwinters in the gall.

The galls have been found on Algerian oak (Quercus canariensis), Turkey oak (Quercus cerris), Portuguese oak (Quercus faginea), Spanish oak (Quercus × hispanica), sessile oak (Quercus petraea), downy oak (Quercus pubescens), Pyrenean oak (Quercus pyrenaica) and pedunculate oak (Quercus robur).

Location of gall	Sexual/asexual	Photograph	Description
Leaf	sexual		Approximately 8 mm, roughly globular and have thin walls with a small inner gall. They often coalesce and can [be] clustered near the leaf base where they can cause distortion.
Petiole	sexual		
Twig	sexual		Causes the twig to bend
End of twig	sexual		
Catkin	sexual		Up to 5 mm in diameter. The remains of the catkin is bent 90° and can still be seen at the tip.
Bud	asexual		Often concealed among the bud scales, and at first, difficult to find. The scales may fall away, exposing a 3 mm, smooth, brown, skittle-shaped gall with a nipple-like tip, usually surrounded by a pale ring. In old galls the ring may not be seen. The wasps overwinter in this gall.

== Distribution ==
The gall is found from Ireland to Ukraine and from Fennoscandia to the Mediterranean.
