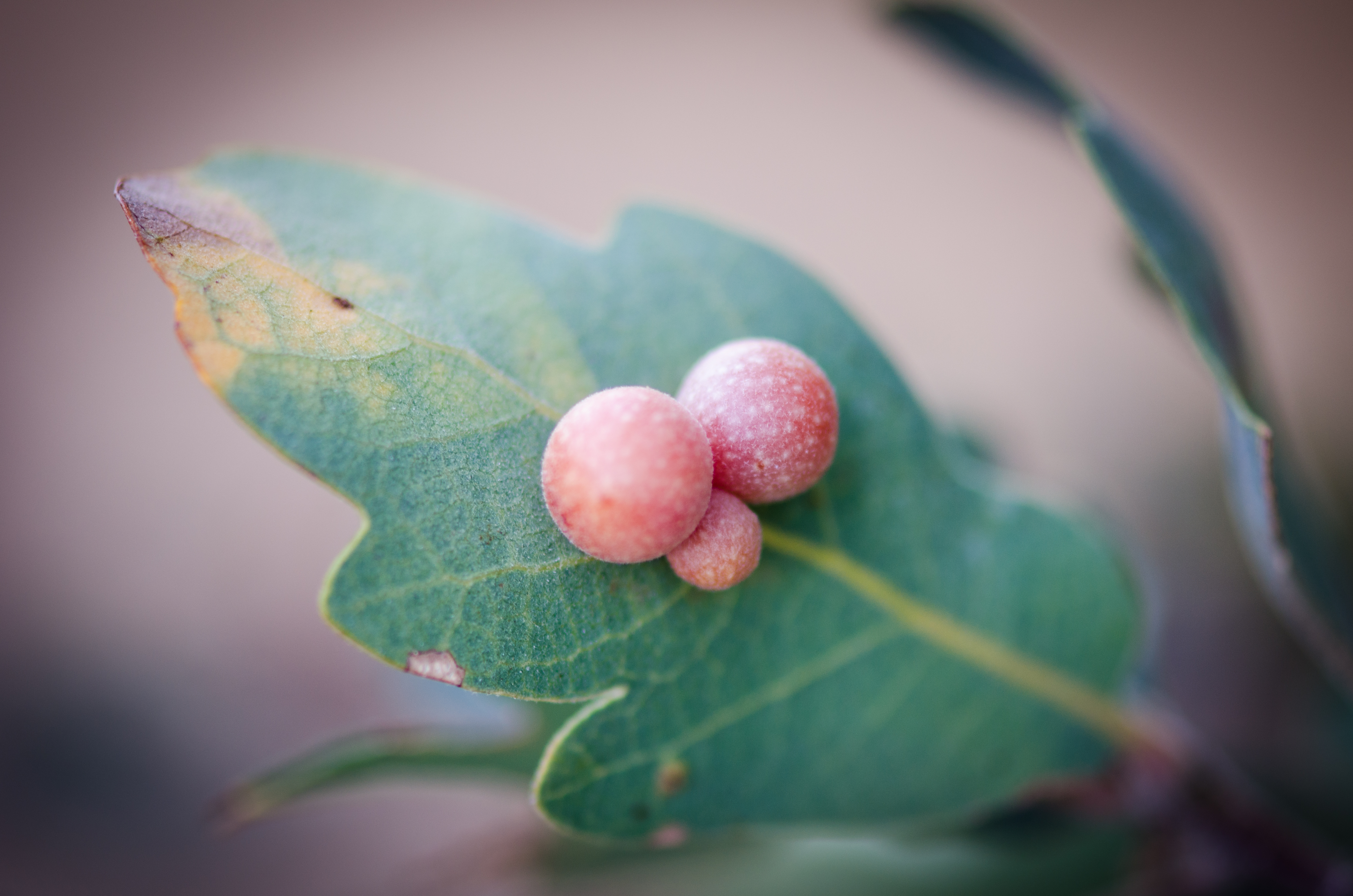
- The galls induced by Andricus brunneus

Scientific classification
- Kingdom: Animalia
- Phylum: Arthropoda
- Class: Insecta
- Order: Hymenoptera
- Family: Cynipidae
- Genus: Andricus
- Species: A. brunneus

Binomial name
- Andricus brunneus Fullaway, 1911

= Andricus brunneus =

Species of wasp

Andricus brunneus, also known as the clustered gall wasp, is a species of oak gall wasp in the genus Andricus. It lives along the Pacific Coast of North America. Only females of this species are known. Adults are brown or reddish-brown and about 3 millimetres (0.12 in) long. It induces round galls on the leaves of white oaks, especially blue oaks. These galls are usually found in clusters, reddish to light brown, and about 6 millimetres (0.24 in) in diameter. Each holds a single larval chamber, from which adult females emerge in autumn.
