= Andricus notholithocarpi =

Scientific classification
- Domain: Eukaryota
- Kingdom: Animalia
- Phylum: Arthropoda
- Class: Insecta
- Order: Hymenoptera
- Family: Cynipidae
- Genus: Andricus
- Species: A. notholithocarpi

Binomial name
- Andricus notholithocarpi Melika, Nicholls & Stone, 2018

Species of Wasp

Andricus notholithocarpi is a species of gall wasp that forms galls on Notholithocarpus plants. It can produce galls of four types, three differentiated only by where on the plant they occur: buds, catkins, or leaves.
