= Andricus opertus =

Fimbriate gall wasp

Scientific classification
- Kingdom: Animalia
- Phylum: Arthropoda
- Class: Insecta
- Order: Hymenoptera
- Family: Cynipidae
- Genus: Andricus
- Species: A. o.

Binomial name
- Andricus opertus (Weld, 1926)

Synonyms
- Diplolepis operta

Species of wasp

Andricus opertus, the fimbriate gall wasp, is a species of wasp in the family Cynipidae whose bisexual generation induces elongate, spiky galls on the leaves of various species of oaks in California, including valley oak and scrub oak. The galls of the bisexual generation form in spring, adults emerge in late spring, and galls persist on trees until the fall. The unisexual generation of this species forms aborted bud galls in the summer and fall.
