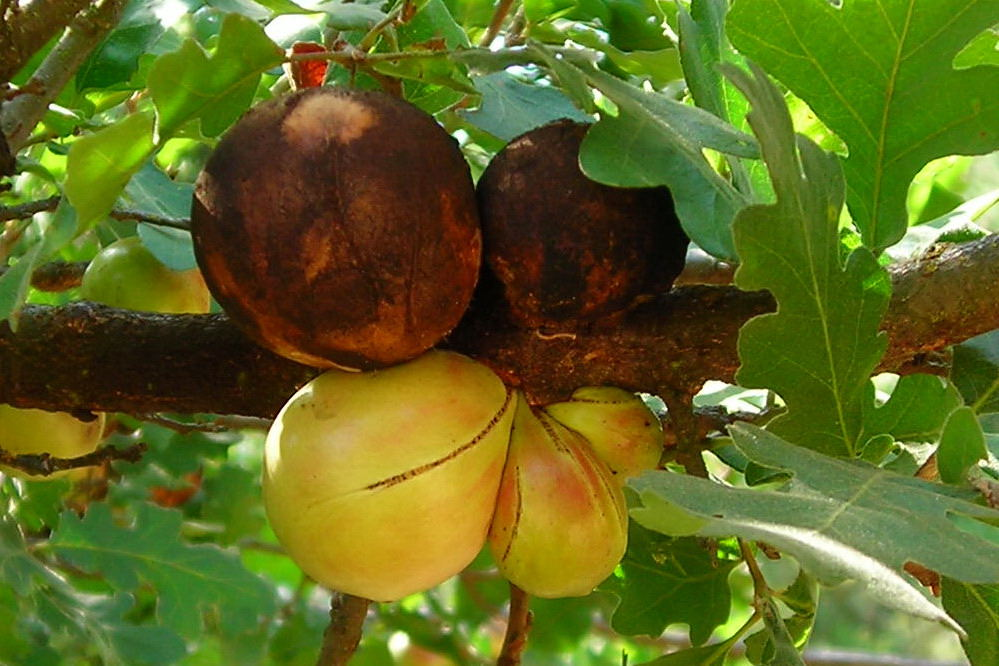
- Andricus quercuscalifornicus galls

Scientific classification
- Kingdom: Animalia
- Phylum: Arthropoda
- Clade: Pancrustacea
- Class: Insecta
- Order: Hymenoptera
- Family: Cynipidae
- Genus: Andricus
- Species: A. quercuscalifornicus

Binomial name
- Andricus quercuscalifornicus (Bassett, 1881)

Synonyms
- Cynips Q. californica Bassett, 1881

= Andricus quercuscalifornicus =

Species of wasp

Andricus quercuscalifornicus (occasionally Andricus californicus), or the California gall wasp, is a small wasp species that induces oak apple galls on white oaks, primarily the valley oak (Quercus lobata) but also other species such as Quercus berberidifolia, and Quercus garryana in Oregon. The California gall wasp is considered an ecosystem engineer, capable of manipulating the growth of galls for their own development. It is found from Washington, Oregon, and California to northern regions of Mexico. Often multiple wasps in different life stages occupy the same gall. The induced galls help establish complex insect communities, promoting the diversification in niche differentiation. Furthermore, the adaptive value of these galls could be attributed their ecological benefits such as nutrition, provision of microenvironment, and enemy avoidance.

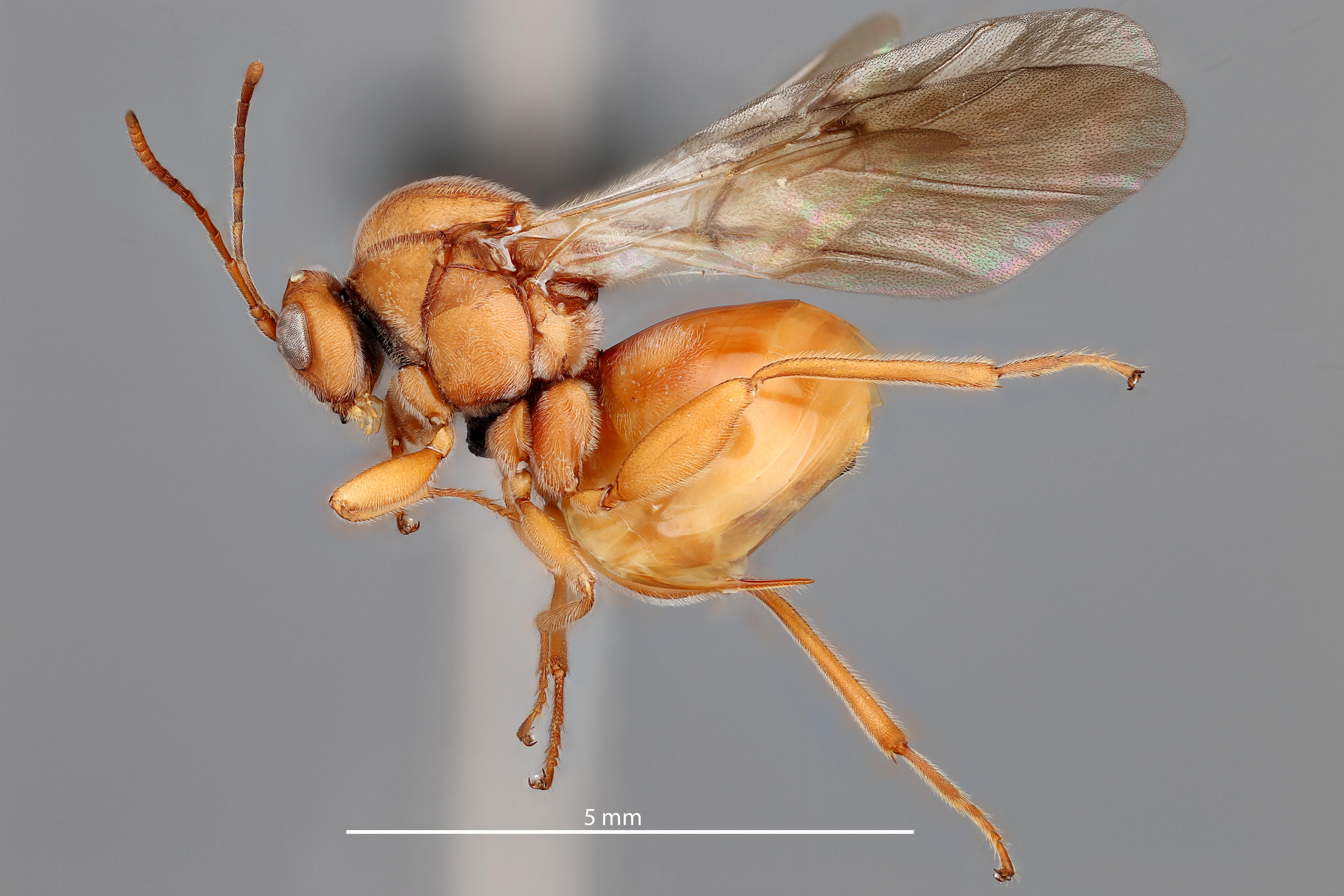
Adult Andricus quercuscalifornicus.

== Description ==
The adult wasps are small, stout and brown, about 5 mm long with clear wings nearly twice the length of the body. The antennae are filiform and about the same length as the legs. Despite their size they are one of the largest species of cynipid wasps.

The gall itself is a typical oak apple gall in appearance, roughly spherical and varies from greenish to reddish or orange depending on host, age and environmental conditions. The galls range in size from a 2–14 cm across and often contain multiple larvae as well as parasites and other species that form a mutual relationship by feeding off the galls themselves. The outer galls are hard in texture and are not easy to penetrate.

== Habitat ==
Andricus quercuscalifornicus can induce and inhabit the galls of a variety of oak species, but they are primarily found in the galls of the Valley Oak. Due to this, they are usually found in areas such as riparian forests, open foothill woodlands, valley savannas, plant groves, and suburban areas. The wasps typically induce galls on the twigs of the Valley Oak, but the inter-tree distribution of these galls can be influenced by a multitude of factors including shoot vigor and the genotype of each tree.

== Life cycle ==
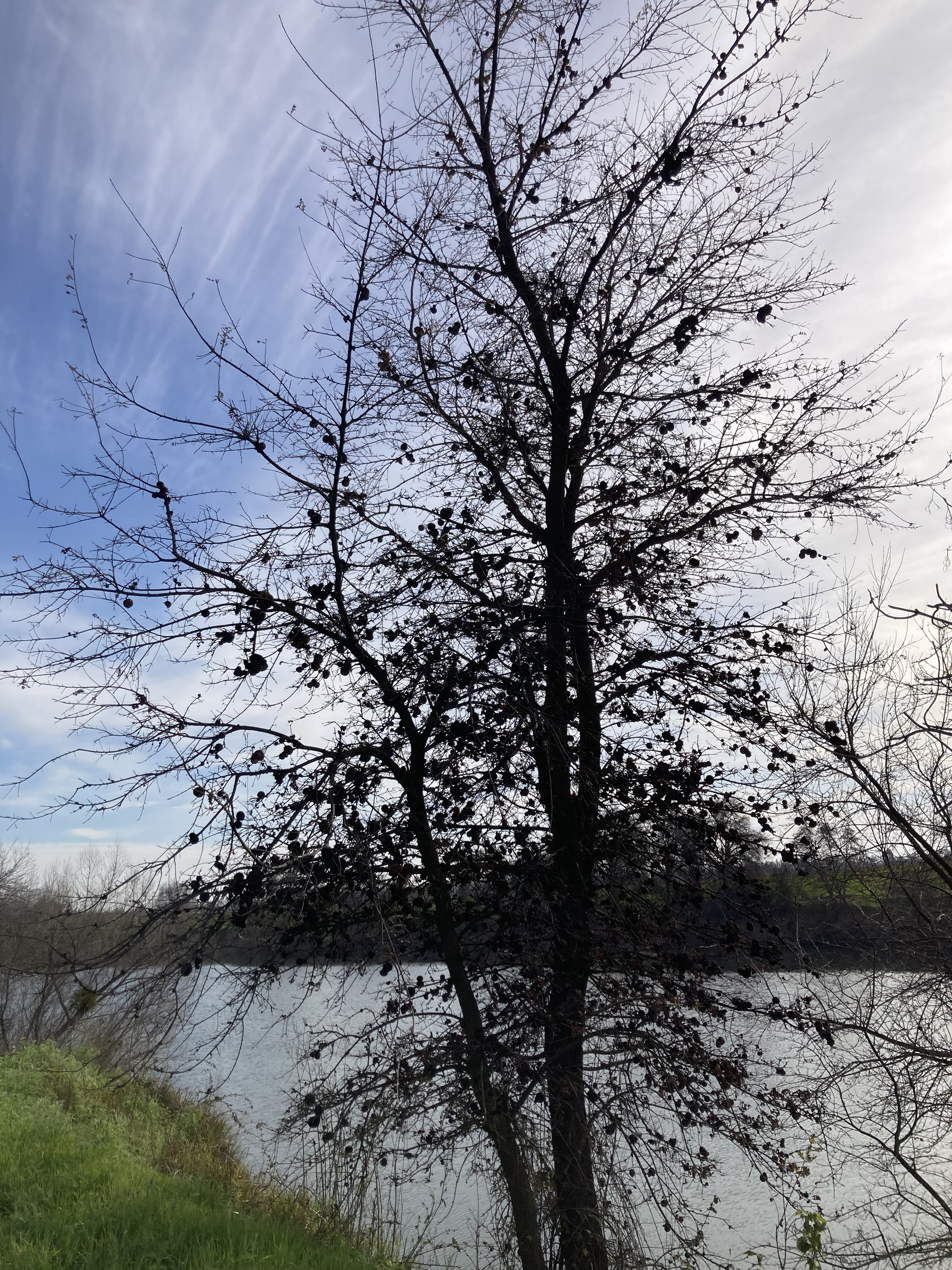
Quercus Lobata covered in oak apples from this wasp.

Andricus quercuscalifornicus is believed to reproduce strictly by parthenogenesis, and no male specimens have ever been recovered. According to phylogenetic studies, several species of the genus Andricus have cryptic sexual generations. The adult female lays eggs in the cambium layer of oak twigs during the fall using her ovipositor. More vigorous twigs will have more galls. The eggs overwinter on the twig, and then hatch in the spring, usually in early April. The resulting larvae induce galls immediately, where they can seem to balloon almost overnight onto the tree. This is the point where most of the parasitoids enter the gall, while it is still soft and small enough for their ovipositor to reach the larvae. After anywhere from a few weeks to two months, the gall stops growing and begins to desiccate, turning tan or brown. The larvae pupate and then bore their way out of the gall in late summer or early fall and fly off to lay eggs in other trees. A few larvae overwinter inside the gall and don't emerge until the following fall. The reason for this is unknown.

These wasps form an important role in the ecosystem, with more than 20 known species that are parasitoids, inquilines, and hyperparasites that live on its life cycle, while the galls form a persistent shelter for various forms of fungi as well as many other insects. Several birds are also known to feed from the galls and their inhabitants.

== Life history of the oak gallwasps ==
Andricus quercuscalifornicus is a parasitic species of gallwasp (Hymenoptera, Cynipidae, Cynipini). The cynipid gall-inducer induces galls of 5-20 cubic centimeters on the twigs of the valley oak (Quercus lobata), an endemic tree in California. Gall growth occurs twice annually, during late spring and mid summer. The abundance and distribution of these galls vary between individual trees, however, there is recorded evidence of trees supporting high densities of galls (50 galls per cubic meter). The native range of these gall wasps spans from most of California (extremes of southern Washington) to northern Mexico.

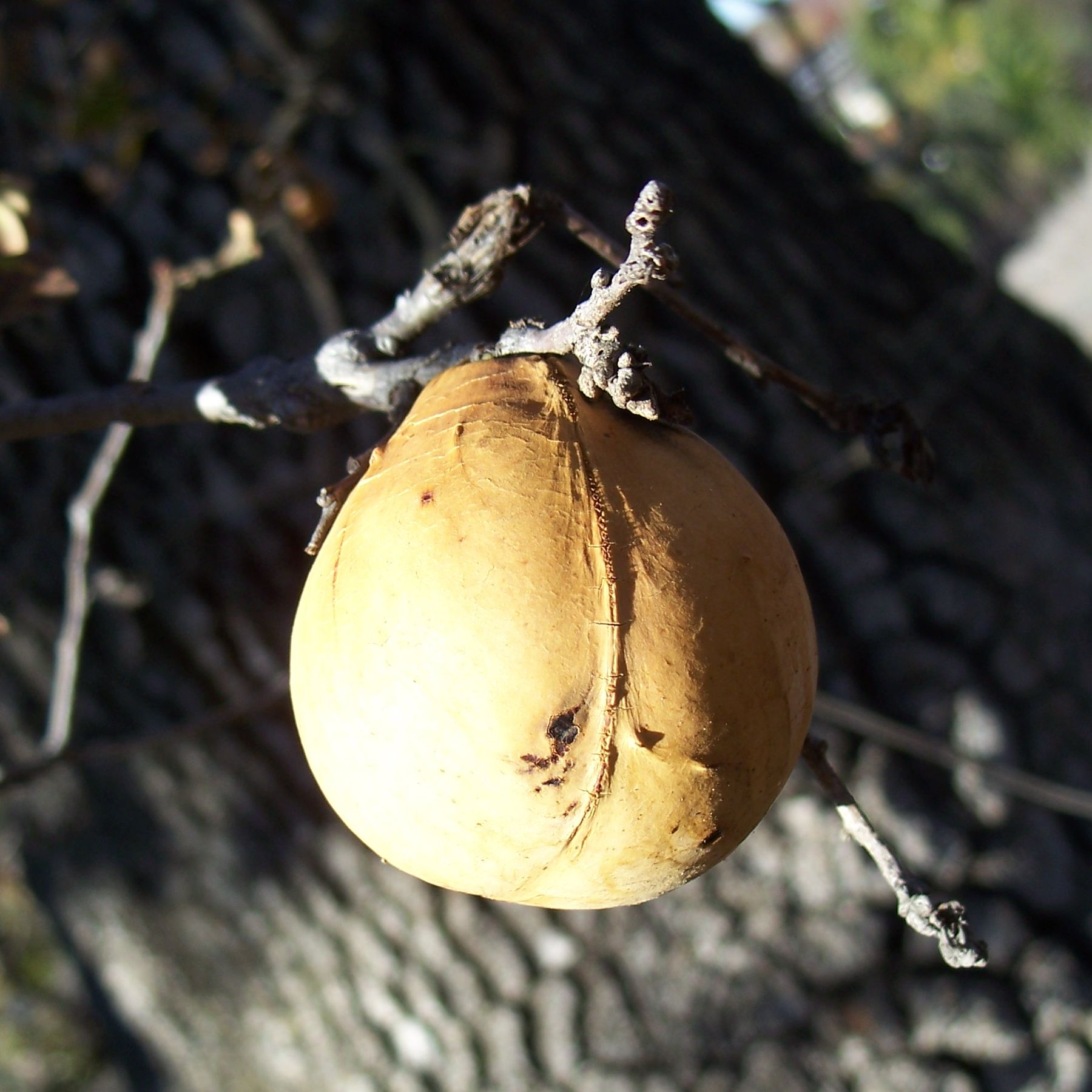
Andricus quercuscalifornicus induced gall on Quercus lobata.

== Adaptive value of gall induction ==
Andricus quercuscalifornicus is an example of an ecosystem engineer because of its ability to induce gall growth. Several evolutionary hypotheses have been proposed to explain the adaptive nature of plant galls. Many of the benefits of induced galls include nutrition, a refuge from natural enemies, and a consistent environment with controlled abiotic factors. Each of these ecological functions can be described as the "nutrition hypothesis", "enemy-avoidance hypothesis", and "microenvironment hypothesis" respectively. According to recent findings, experimental manipulation of abiotic factors (i.e., relative ambient humidity) indicated that A. quercuscalifornicus larvae modify the internal environments of galls, thereby, supporting the microenvironment hypothesis. Galls have hygrothermal inertia to slow down the rates of change of abiotic conditions, providing a buffer against desiccation; most apparent in immature galls. Furthermore, support for the microenvironment hypothesis does not supersede both the natural enemies and nutrition hypotheses. The large galls produced by A. quercuscalifornicus may aid in the protection against other parasitoids however, this can also led to increase predation from avian species. The moist conditions created in the internal microclimate of galls can also led to increased chance of fungal infection.

== A. quercuscalifornicus insect community ==
Through modifications of plant tissue, A. quercuscalifornicus is considered a keystone species, facilitating living conditions for a succession of other species. The induced galls are shared with a community of insects including transient occupants, opportunistic foragers, parasitoids, inquilines, and parasitoids of inquilines. These galls are divided into microscale niches allowing for the coexistence of ecologically similar species that exploit similar feeding strategies. Differences in gall morphology, phenology, and location allows for patterns in differential niche uses to arise. It is possible that niche differentiation may account for the diversity of parasitoid species associated with gall wasps. Gall characteristics can also be predictors of community-level species composition.

== See also ==
- Oak apple
