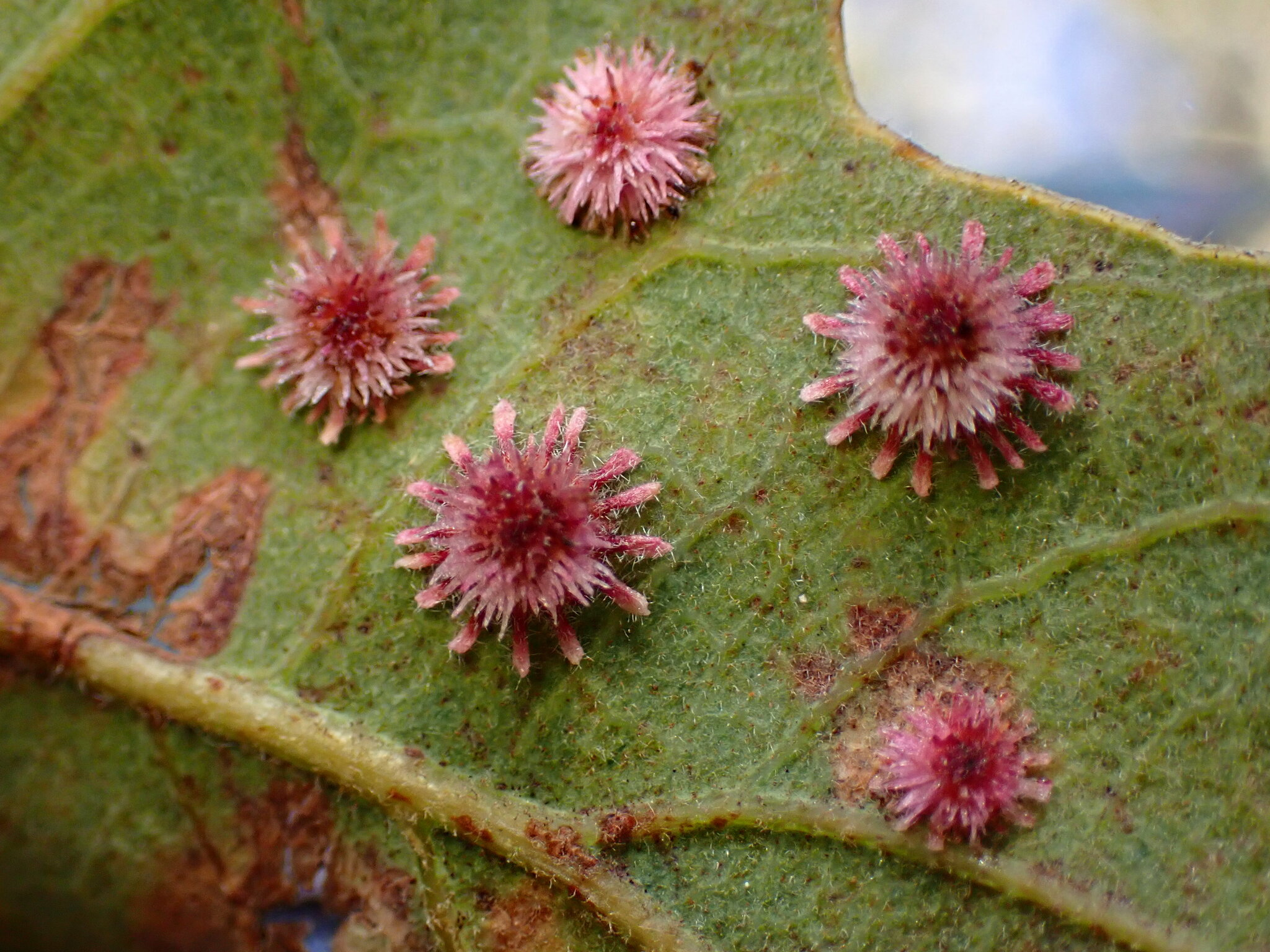
- Sunburst galls on an oak leaf, Santa Rosa, 2022

Scientific classification
- Kingdom: Animalia
- Phylum: Arthropoda
- Class: Insecta
- Order: Hymenoptera
- Family: Cynipidae
- Genus: Andricus
- Species: A. stellaris

Binomial name
- Andricus stellaris (Weld, 1926)

= Andricus stellaris =

North American gall-inducing wasp

Andricus stellaris, the sunburst gall wasp, is a fairly common species of cynipid wasp that produces galls on blue oaks and Oregon oaks on the Pacific coast of North America. The wasp oviposits on the underside of leaves, between the lateral veins; the larval chamber is the brightly colored spot at the center of the gall. The chamber is surrounded by a crystalline structure.
