= Mary Isabel McCracken =

American entomologist

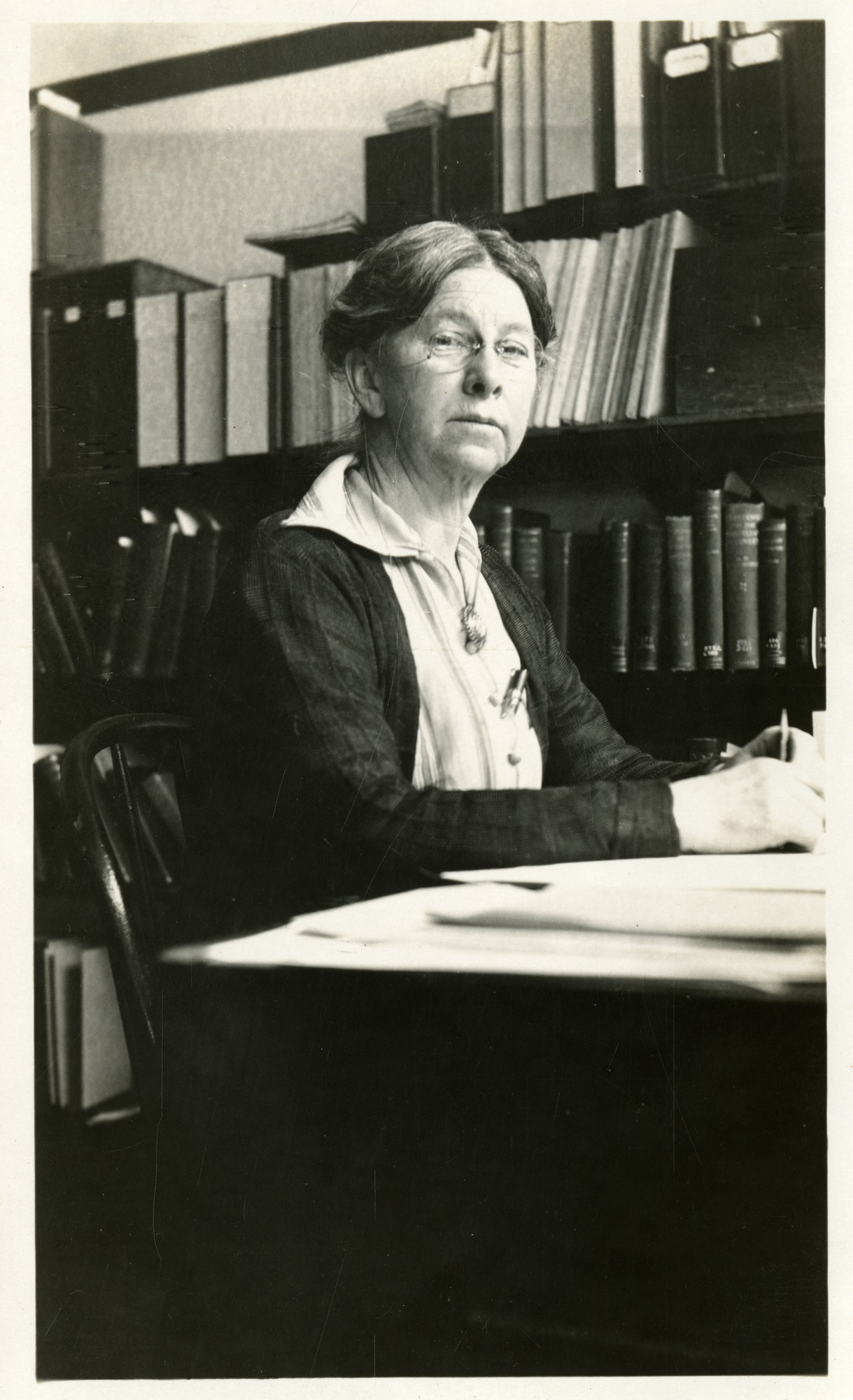
- Born: 1866; Oakland, California
- Died: October 29, 1955 (aged 88–89); Stanford, California
- Scientific career
- Fields: Entomology

Mary Isabel McCracken (1866 – October 29, 1955) was an American entomologist, researcher and teacher.

== Career ==
McCracken was born in Oakland, California in 1866. She began her teaching career at Oakland's public schools. After a decade of teaching and at the age of 34 she enrolled at Stanford University.

McCracken continued at Stanford University completing her A.B. degree in 1904, her M.A. in 1905, and her Ph.D. in 1908. While at Stanford she started her university teaching career during her senior year when she was employed as an assistant in physiology and entomology. While at Stanford McCracken also began to undertake field trips and laboratory research on the genetics of beetles. She published several papers founded on the results she obtained from these investigations. She also engaged in research on a wide range of other insects including mosquitoes, silkworms, aphids, and bees, and was first to describe non-Mendelian inheritance as "purely maternal". McCracken also conducted field observation on numerous birds in the Sierra Nevada.

Over the years she climbed the academic ladder to obtain the position of Professor of Zoology. The only period she took as a sabbatical from her teaching was during 1913–14. During her sabbatical McCracken travelled to Europe where she studied at the University of Paris, returning at the beginning of World War I. She retired in 1931 having obtained Professor Emeritus status.

After her retirement from Stanford she held the position of Research Associate at the California Academy of Sciences from 1931 through 1942. McCracken worked in the bird and insect collections of the academy. She was a member of the Entomological Society of America, elected August 21, 1907. She was also a member of the California Academy of Sciences from 1915 and was named a Fellow in 1929.

== Death ==
McCracken died on October 29, 1955, in her home on the Stanford campus.

== Selected publications ==
- California Gall-making Cynipidae: With Descriptions of New Species by Mary Isabel McCracken, Dorothy Barnes Egbert Stanford University Press, 1922
- The animals and man: an elementary textbook of zoology and human physiology by Vernon Lyman Kellogg, Mary Isabel McCracken H. Holt and company, 1911
- Occurrence of a Sport in Melasoma (Lina) Scripta and Its Behavior in Heredity by Mary Isabel McCracken Leland Stanford junior university, 1907
