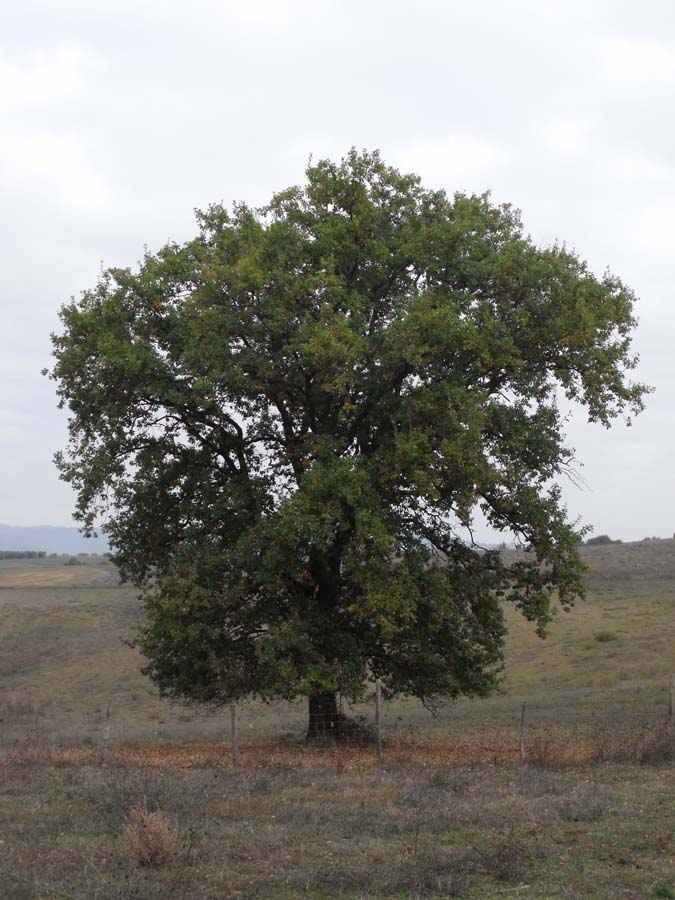
- A mature tree
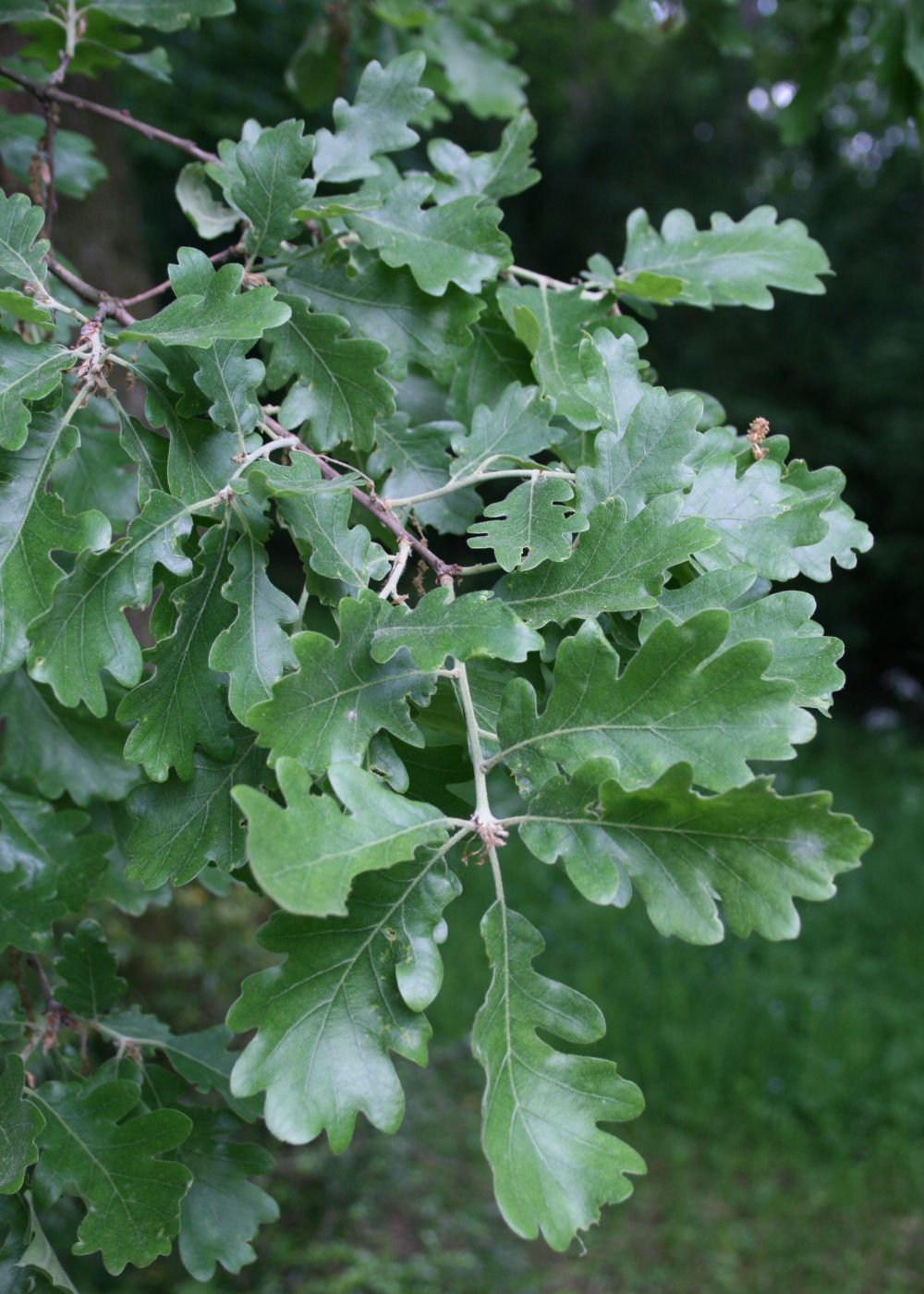
- Leaves

Conservation status
- Least Concern (IUCN 3.1)

Scientific classification
- Kingdom: Plantae
- Clade: Embryophytes
- Clade: Tracheophytes
- Clade: Spermatophytes
- Clade: Angiosperms
- Clade: Eudicots
- Clade: Rosids
- Order: Fagales
- Family: Fagaceae
- Genus: Quercus
- Subgenus: Quercus subg. Quercus
- Section: Quercus sect. Quercus
- Species: Q. pubescens

Binomial name
- Quercus pubescens Willd.
- Distribution map

Synonyms
- List: Eriodrys lanata Raf.; Quercus adjecta Gand.; Quercus admixta Gand.; Quercus aegilops Mill.; Quercus amplifolia Guss.; Quercus appenina Lam.; Quercus aspera Bosc; Quercus asperata Pers.; Quercus bacunensis Vuk.; Quercus banja Endl.; Quercus bellojocensis Gand.; Quercus brachyloba Jord.; Quercus brachyphylla Kotschy; Quercus brachyphylloides Vuk.; Quercus brandisii (Vuk.) Vuk.; Quercus brevifolia Kotschy ex A.DC.; Quercus buccarana Vuk.; Quercus budayana Haberle ex Heuff.; Quercus budensis (Borbás) Borbás; Quercus collina Schleich. ex Endl.; Quercus conglomerata Pers.; Quercus croatica Vuk.; Quercus cupaniana] Guss.; Quercus dalmatica Radic; Quercus diversifrons Borbás; Quercus erythrolepis (Vuk.) Vuk.; Quercus humilis Mill.; Quercus ilicifolia Koord. & Valeton ex Seemen; Quercus lacinifolia Vuk.; Quercus laciniosa Boreau; Quercus lanuginosa (Lam.) Thuill.; Quercus macrostipulata Guss. ex Parl.; Quercus menesiensis Kit.; Quercus microbalanos Boreau; Quercus microlepis Vuk.; Quercus oxycarpa Raddi; Quercus pinnatifida C.C.Gmel.; Quercus pseudoaegilopsis Petz. & G.Kirchn.; Quercus rufa Vuk.; Quercus schulzei (Vuk.) Vuk.; Quercus sectifolia Vuk.; Quercus stenolepis Vuk.; Quercus subspicata (A.Camus) C.Vicioso; Quercus sulcata Vuk.; Quercus susedana Vuk.; Quercus tenorei (A.DC.) Borzí; Quercus torulosa (Vuk.) Raddi; Quercus virgiliana (Ten.) Ten.; Quercus vukotinocicii Borbás; Quercus anatolica O.Schwarz; Quercus crispata Steven; Quercus subpyrenaica Villar

= Quercus pubescens =

Downy oak

Species of oak tree

Quercus pubescens (synonyms virgiliana), commonly known as the downy oak, pubescent oak or Italian oak, is a species of white oak (genus Quercus sect. Quercus) native to southern Europe and southwest Asia. It is found from northern Spain (Pyrenees) and France in the West to Turkey and the Caucasus in the East.

== Description ==
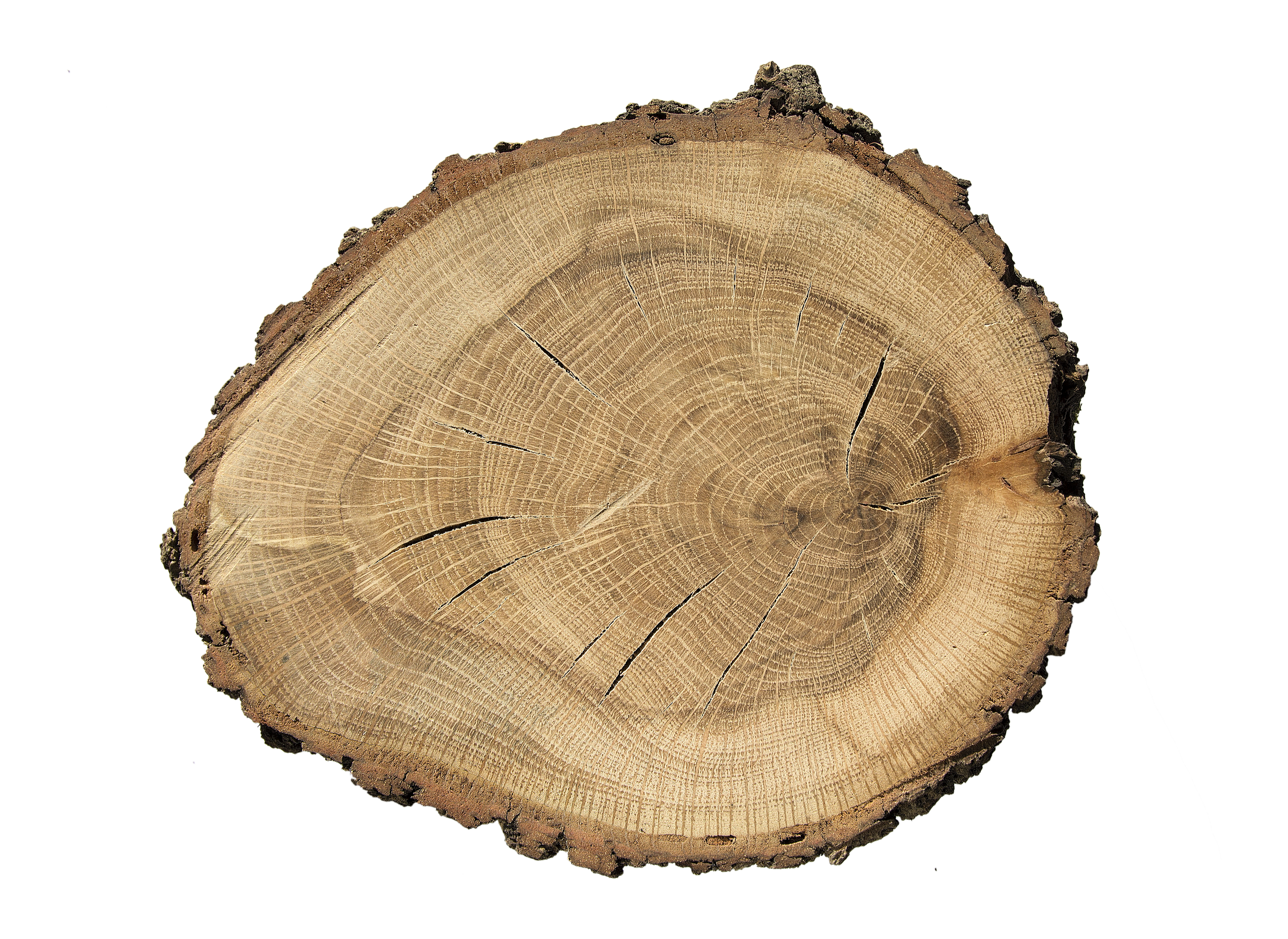
Quercus pubescens cross section

Quercus pubescens is a medium-sized deciduous tree growing up to 20 metres (66 feet). Forest-grown trees grow tall, while open-growing trees develop a very broad and irregular crown. They are long-lived, to several hundred years, and eventually grow into very stout trees with trunks up to 2 m (6 1/2 ft) in diameter. Open-grown trees frequently develop several trunks. The bark is very rough, light gray and divided into small flakes. Large trees develop very thick whitish bark cracked into deep furrows, similar to the pedunculate oak but lighter in colour.

The twigs are light purple or whitish, with tomentum. The buds are small (3–6 millimetres or 1/8–1/4 inch) and blunt, light brown. The leaves are leathery usually 4–10 centimetres (1 1/2–4 in) long (rarely to 13 cm) and 3–6 cm wide, usually widest beyond the middle. The leaves group at the ends of twigs. The upper leaf surface is dark green and rough, the lower light green. Both leaf surfaces are covered with minute pubescence which is sometimes lost in older leaves by late summer. The young expanding leaves are whitish or pinkish with very soft tomentum. The leaf shape is very variable, divided into 3–7 pairs of deep or shallow lobes, which are usually divided into a few sublobes. The lobes are usually blunt, rarely sharp. The apex is usually wide and round. The base of the leaf is heart shaped, widely rounded or sometimes pointed. The petioles are 4–15 mm (rarely to 22 mm) long, stout and pubescent. The leaves are persistent late into the autumn, remaining green up to early winter. They eventually turn russet or brown and fall off.

The Quercus pubescens acorns are light brown to yellow, 8–20 mm long, usually thin and pointed. The acorn cups are light gray to almost white, with pointed, overlapping scales, covered with tomentum. The acorn stalks are thick and pubescent, up to 2 cm long. The acorns usually occur in groups of 2–5 on the same stalk.

== Subspecies ==
Three subspecies are accepted by Flora Europaea:

- Quercus pubescens subsp. pubescens – central and southern Europe.
- Quercus pubescens subsp. anatolica O.Schwarz – southwest Asia, southeast Europe.
- Quercus pubescens subsp. palensis (Palassou) O.Schwarz – northern Spain, Pyrenees.

== Habitat ==
Downy oaks typically grow in dry, lime-rich soils. It is a sub-Mediterranean species, growing from the coastline to deep in the continent. Its optimum is in transitional Mediterranean-oceanic climates, characterized by warm to hot, dry summers and cool (though not mild) winters with ample precipitation.

== Gallery ==
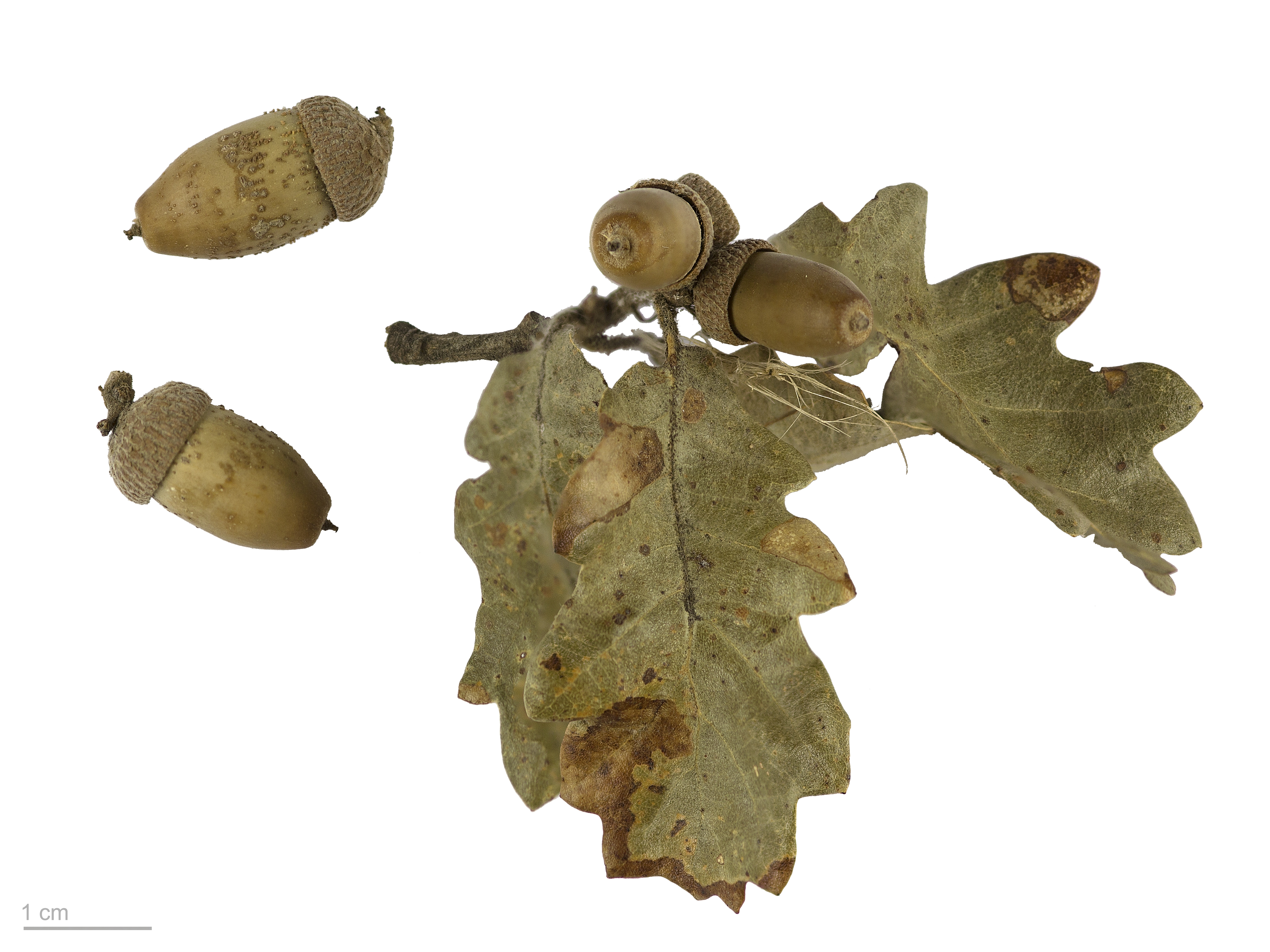
The dried leaves and acorns

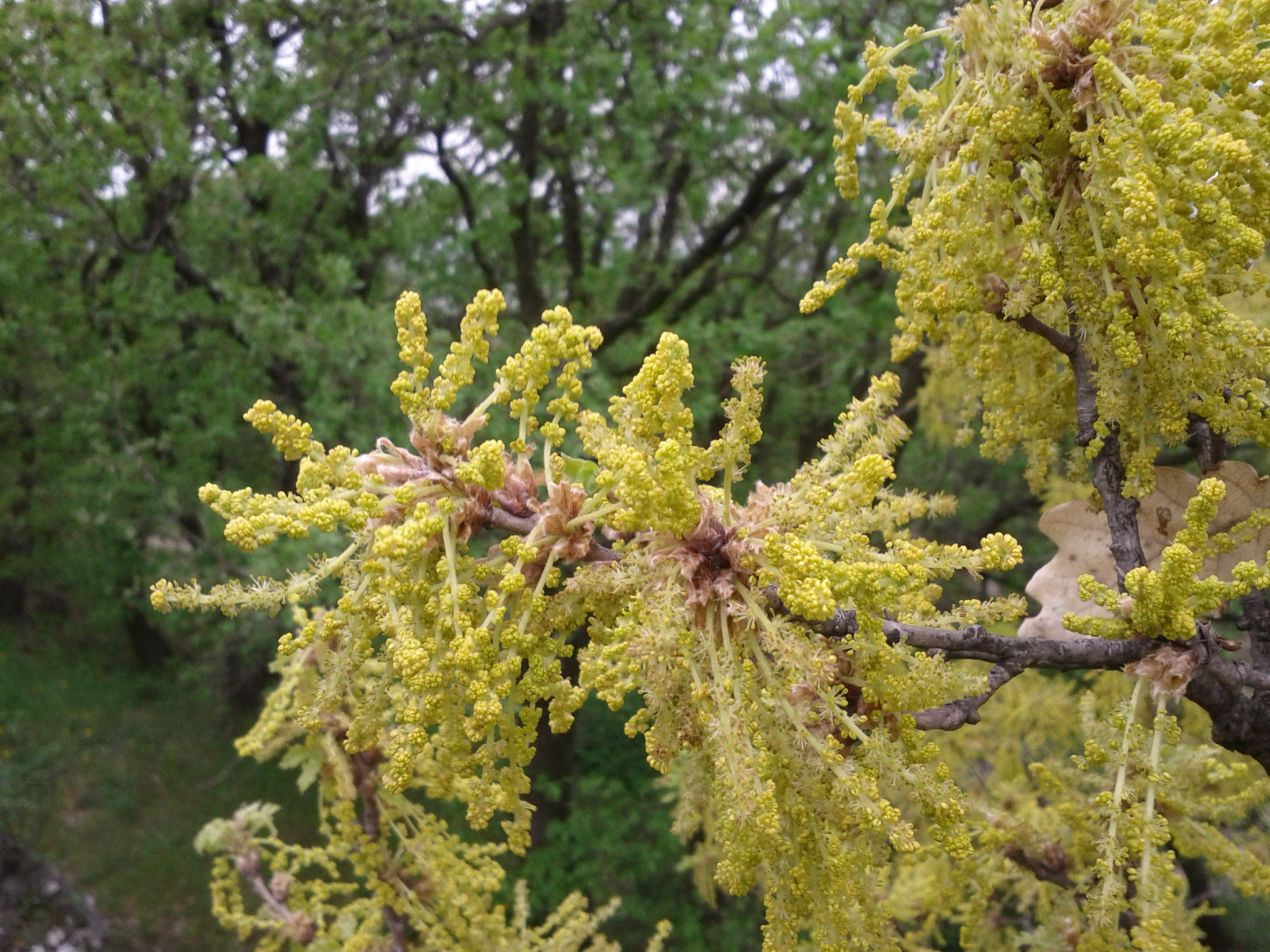
The flowers

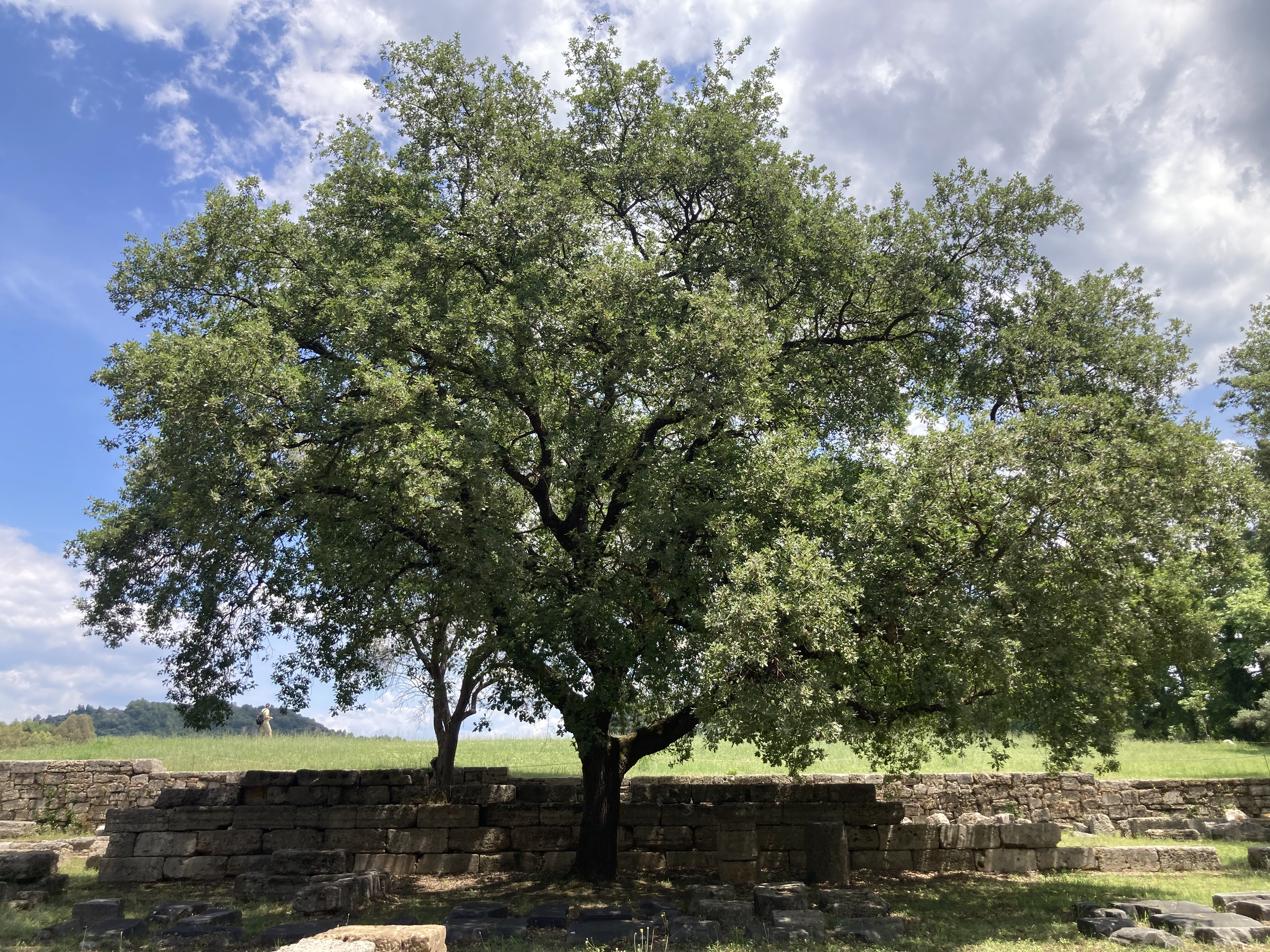
Mature specimen at Ancient Olympia

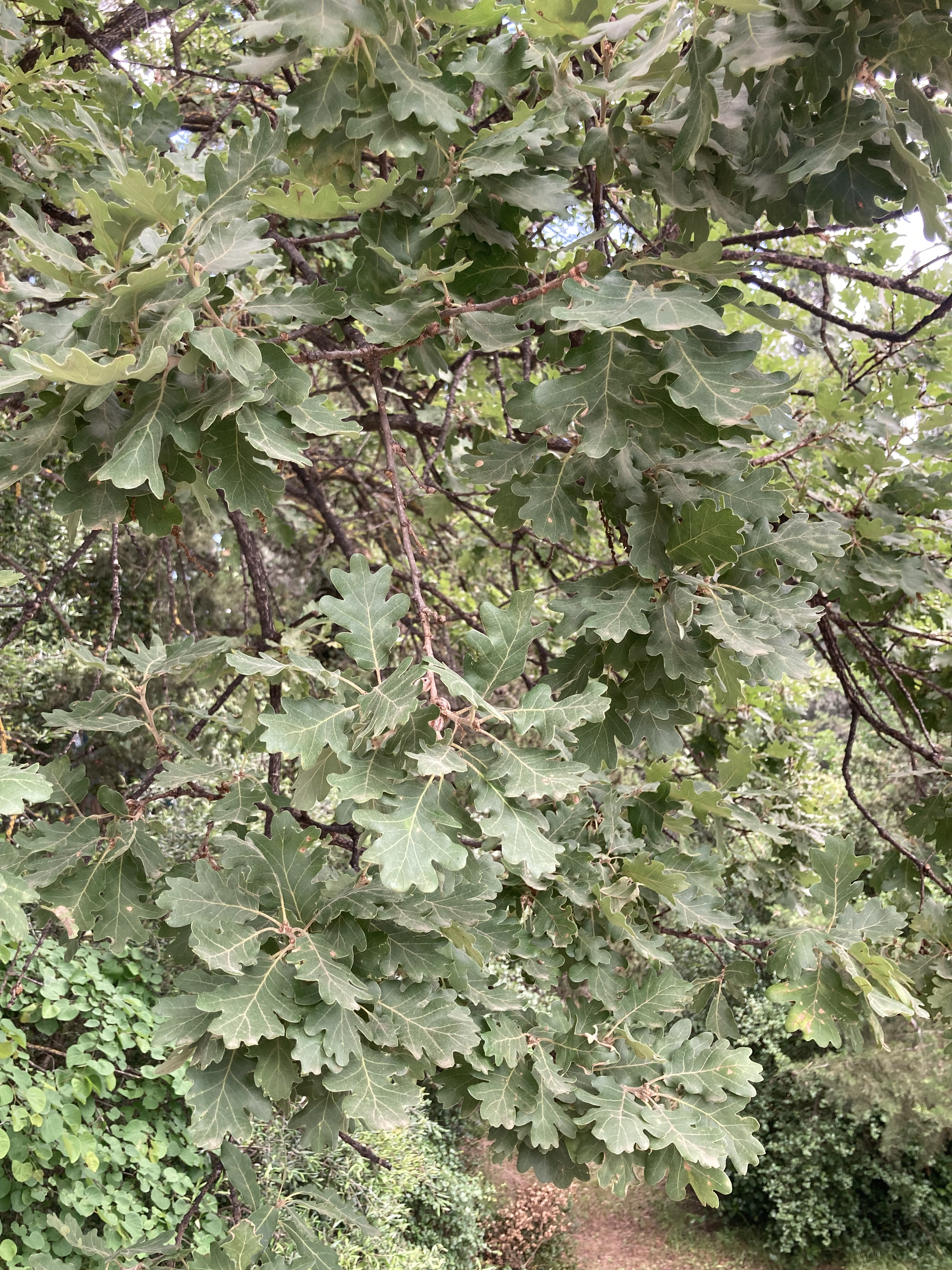
Detail of the leaves

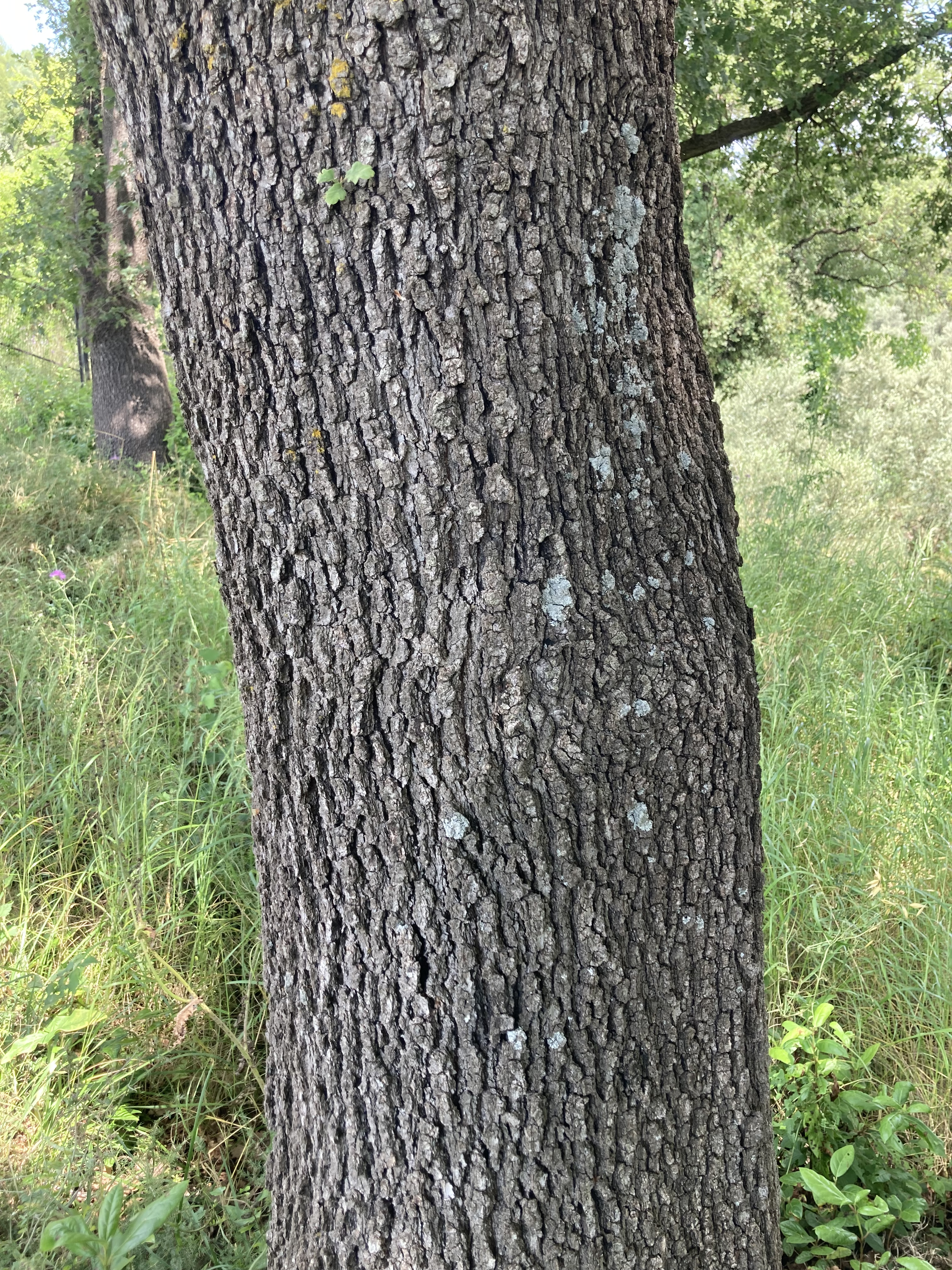
Detail of the bark
