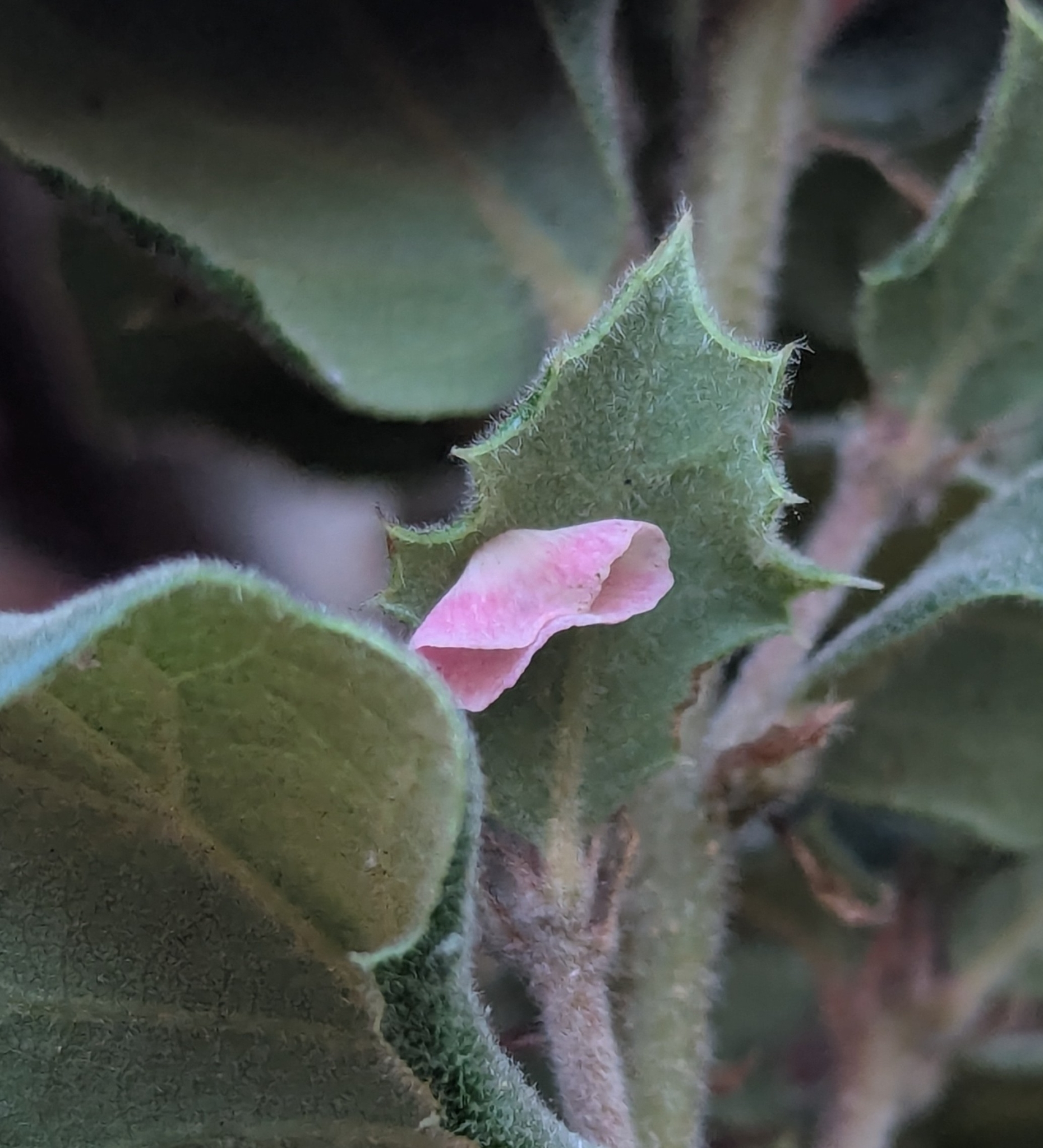
- The gall formed by the asexual generation of F. izabellae, shown here on the leaf of Quercus durata, San Mateo County, 2025

Scientific classification
- Kingdom: Animalia
- Phylum: Arthropoda
- Class: Insecta
- Order: Hymenoptera
- Family: Cynipidae
- Genus: Feron
- Species: F. izabellae

Binomial name
- Feron izabellae Melika, Nicholls & Stone, sp. nov.

= Feron izabellae =

Species of wasp

Feron izabellae, also known as the pink bow-tie gall wasp, is a species of oak gall wasp in the genus Feron in the family Cynipidae. The wasp induces small (up to 5mm diameter) pink spangle galls, with edges that fold towards the center in maturity to resemble a bow-tie, which gives rise to the common name. F. izabellae galls can be found on the abaxial leaf surface of four white oak species: California scrub oak, Oregon oak, blue oak, and leather oak. Only the asexual generation is known, and was first described from Northern California by George Melika, James, A. Nicholls, and Graham N. Stone. The leaf galls mature some time in September or October, after which the adults emerge. Adults are almost uniformly light brown to yellowish in color, with a slightly darker head.

== Etymology ==
Feron izabellae was named in memory of Melika’s mother, Izabella, and Melika’s granddaughter who bears the same name.
