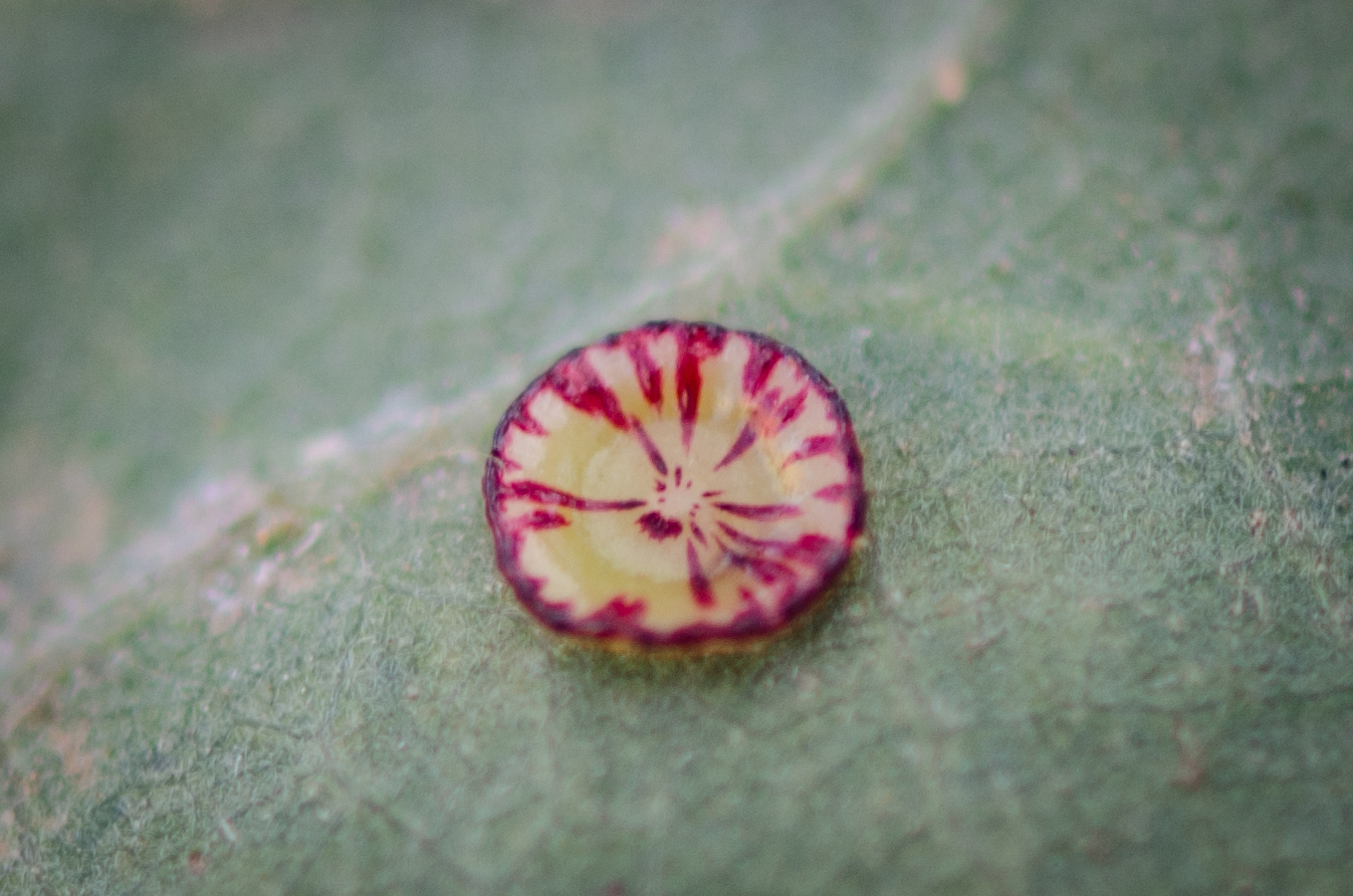
- A gall formed by F. parmula

Scientific classification
- Kingdom: Animalia
- Phylum: Arthropoda
- Class: Insecta
- Order: Hymenoptera
- Family: Cynipidae
- Genus: Feron
- Species: F. parmula

Binomial name
- Feron parmula Bassett, 1900

Synonyms
- Andricus parmula

= Feron parmula =

Species of wasp

Feron parmula, also known as the disc gall wasp, is a species of oak gall wasp in the genus Feron. It induces galls in a wide selection of oak species, especially white oaks, and including hybrids. The galls are disc-shaped, up to 3 mm in diameter, and pale with red streaking. Adult females emerge in April. The galls induced by F. parmula superficially resemble the galls of Feron gigas, Andricus viscidus, and newly identified species called the "plate gall wasp" and the "orange-cap gall wasp" by Ronald Russo. Galls induced by this wasp have been documented in Oregon and California on the Pacific coast of North America.
