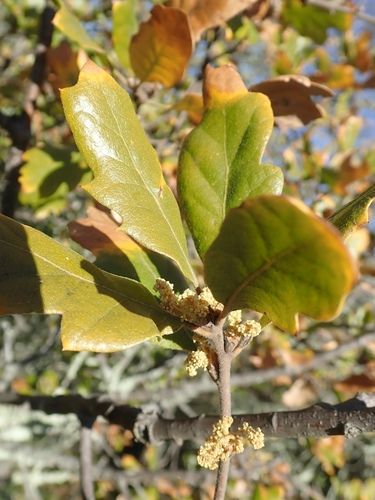

Scientific classification
- Kingdom: Plantae
- Clade: Tracheophytes
- Clade: Angiosperms
- Clade: Eudicots
- Clade: Rosids
- Order: Fagales
- Family: Fagaceae
- Genus: Quercus
- Species: Q. × subconvexa

Binomial name
- Quercus × subconvexa J.M.Tucker

= Quercus × subconvexa =

Hybrid oak in California

Quercus × subconvexa is a naturally occurring hybrid oak resulting from a cross between Q. durata and Q. garryana, found in California.
