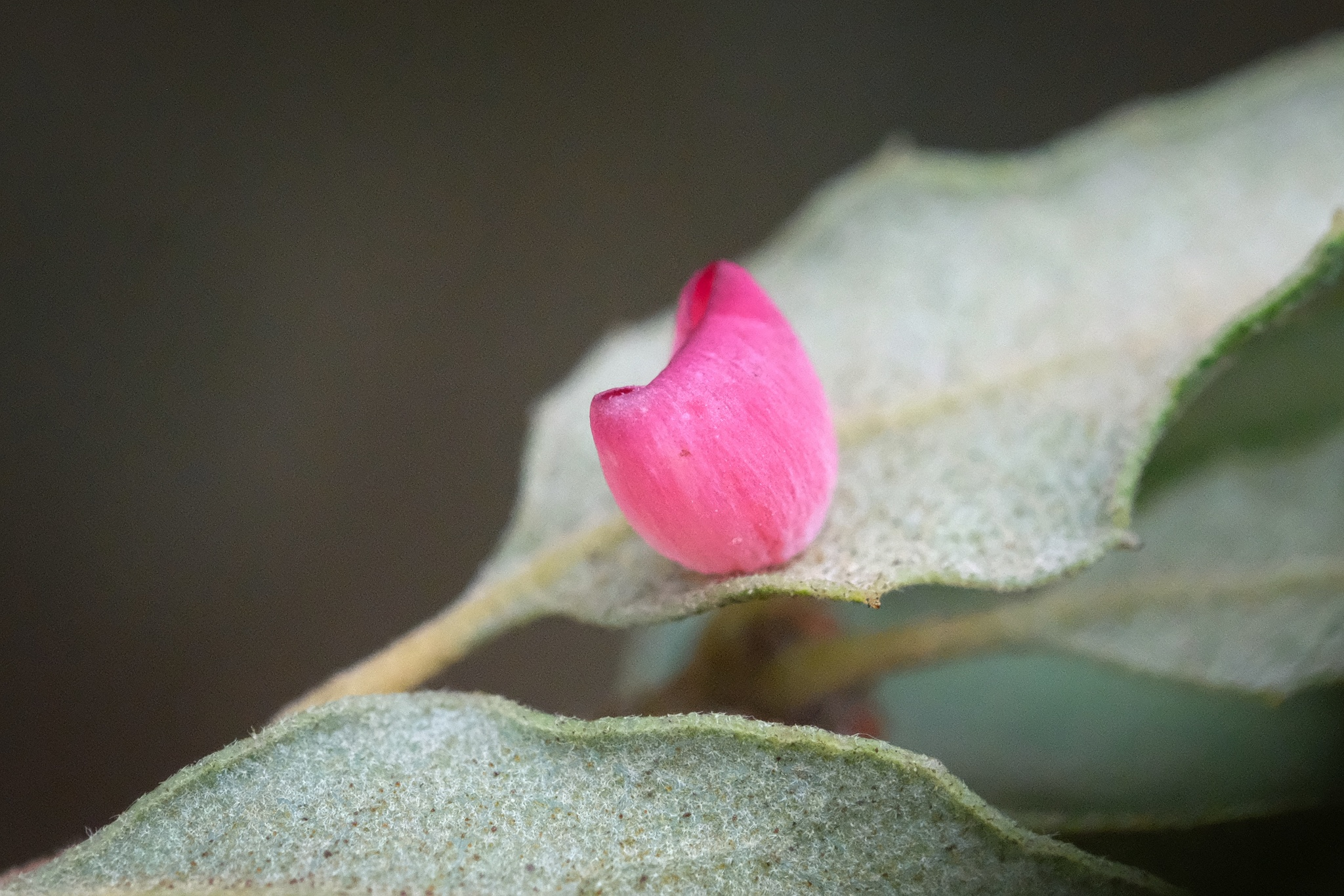
- Gall induced by Feron bakkeri on Quercus berberidifolia leaf, San Diego County, 2021

Scientific classification
- Kingdom: Animalia
- Phylum: Arthropoda
- Class: Insecta
- Order: Hymenoptera
- Family: Cynipidae
- Subfamily: Cynipinae
- Tribe: Cynipini
- Genus: Feron
- Species: F. bakkeri

Binomial name
- Feron bakkeri (Lyon, 1984)

Synonyms
- Andricus bakkeri

= Feron bakkeri =

North American gall-inducing wasp

Feron bakkeri, also known as the pinched leaf gall wasp, is a relatively uncommon species of gall-inducing hymenopteran. They produce pink leaf galls on Oregon oaks and scrub oaks. The distribution of this wasp is California and Oregon in North America. It was previously placed in the genus Andricus.
