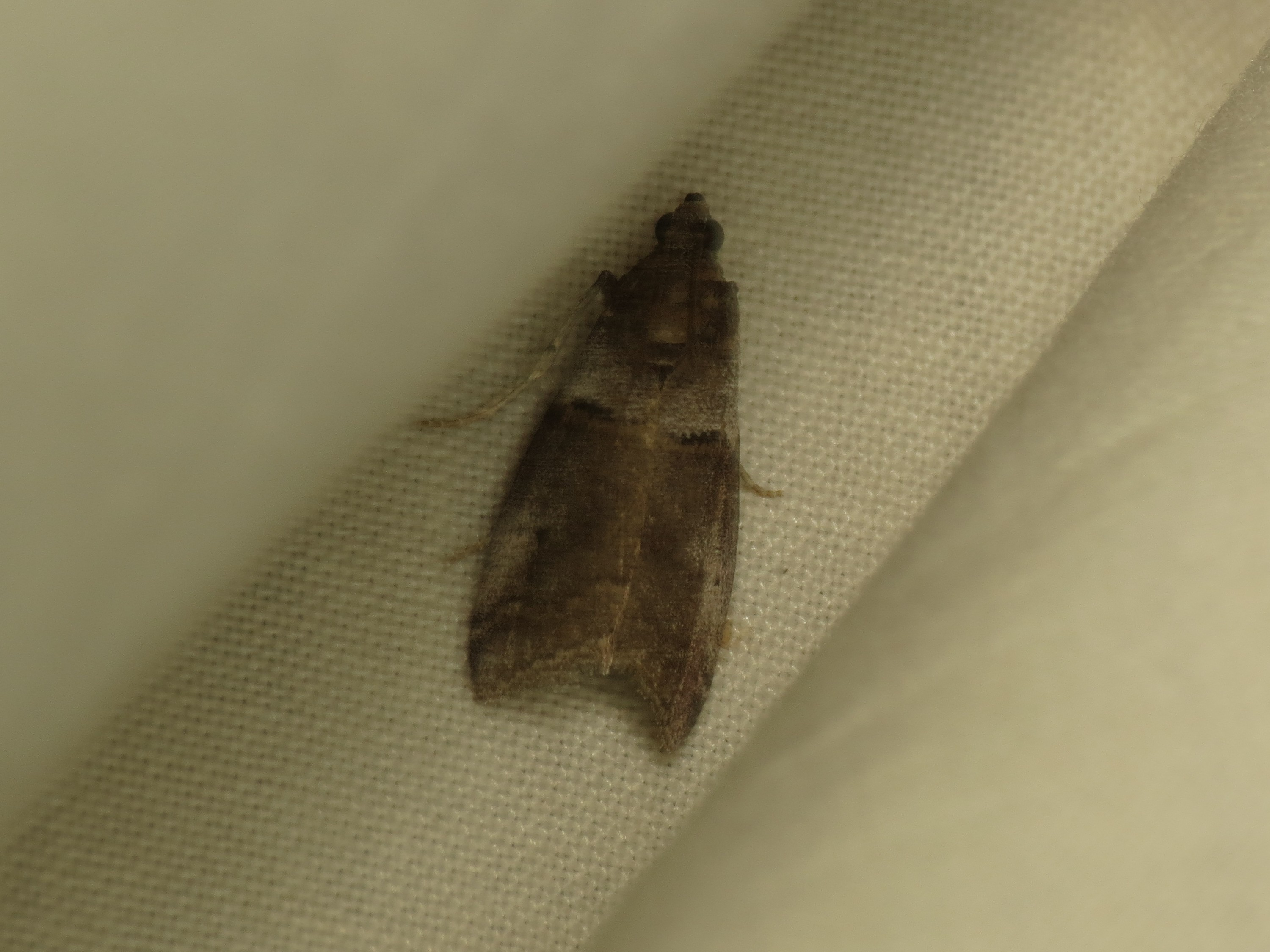

Scientific classification
- Kingdom: Animalia
- Phylum: Arthropoda
- Clade: Pancrustacea
- Class: Insecta
- Order: Lepidoptera
- Family: Pyralidae
- Genus: Acrobasis
- Species: A. caliginella

Binomial name
- Acrobasis caliginella (Hulst, 1878)

Synonyms
- Nephopteryx caliginella Hulst, 1887; Trachycera caliginella; Myelois caliginoidella Dyar, 1905; Rhodophaea cruza Opler, 1977; Rhodophaea durata Opler, 1977; Rhodophaea yuba Opler, 1977

= Acrobasis caliginella =

Species of moth

Acrobasis caliginella is a species of snout moth in the genus Acrobasis. It was described by George Duryea Hulst in 1878. It is found in the US states of California and Arizona.

Quercus agrifolia, Quercus wizlizenii, Quercus dumosa, Quercus durata and Quercus vaccinifolia.
