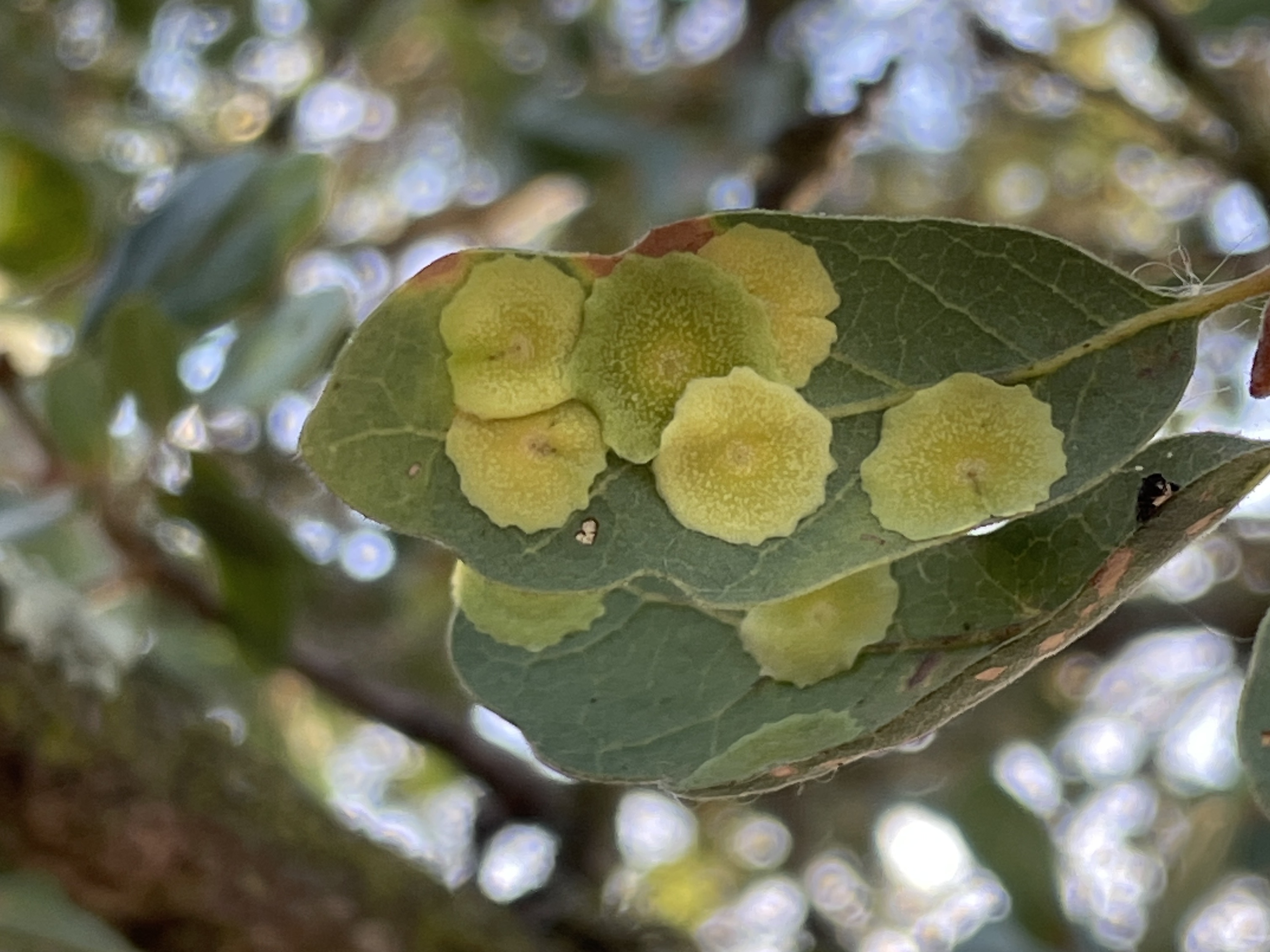
- Galls formed by the all-female generation of Feron pattersonae on oak leaves

Scientific classification
- Kingdom: Animalia
- Phylum: Arthropoda
- Class: Insecta
- Order: Hymenoptera
- Family: Cynipidae
- Genus: Feron
- Species: F. pattersonae

Binomial name
- Feron pattersonae Fullaway, 1911

Synonyms
- Liodora pattersonae; Andricus pattersonae; Andricus pedicellatus

= Feron pattersonae =

Species of wasp

Feron pattersonae, also known as the plate gall wasp, is a species of oak gall wasp in the genus Feron. Their hosts are among the white oaks grouping of oaks, with blue oak being common.

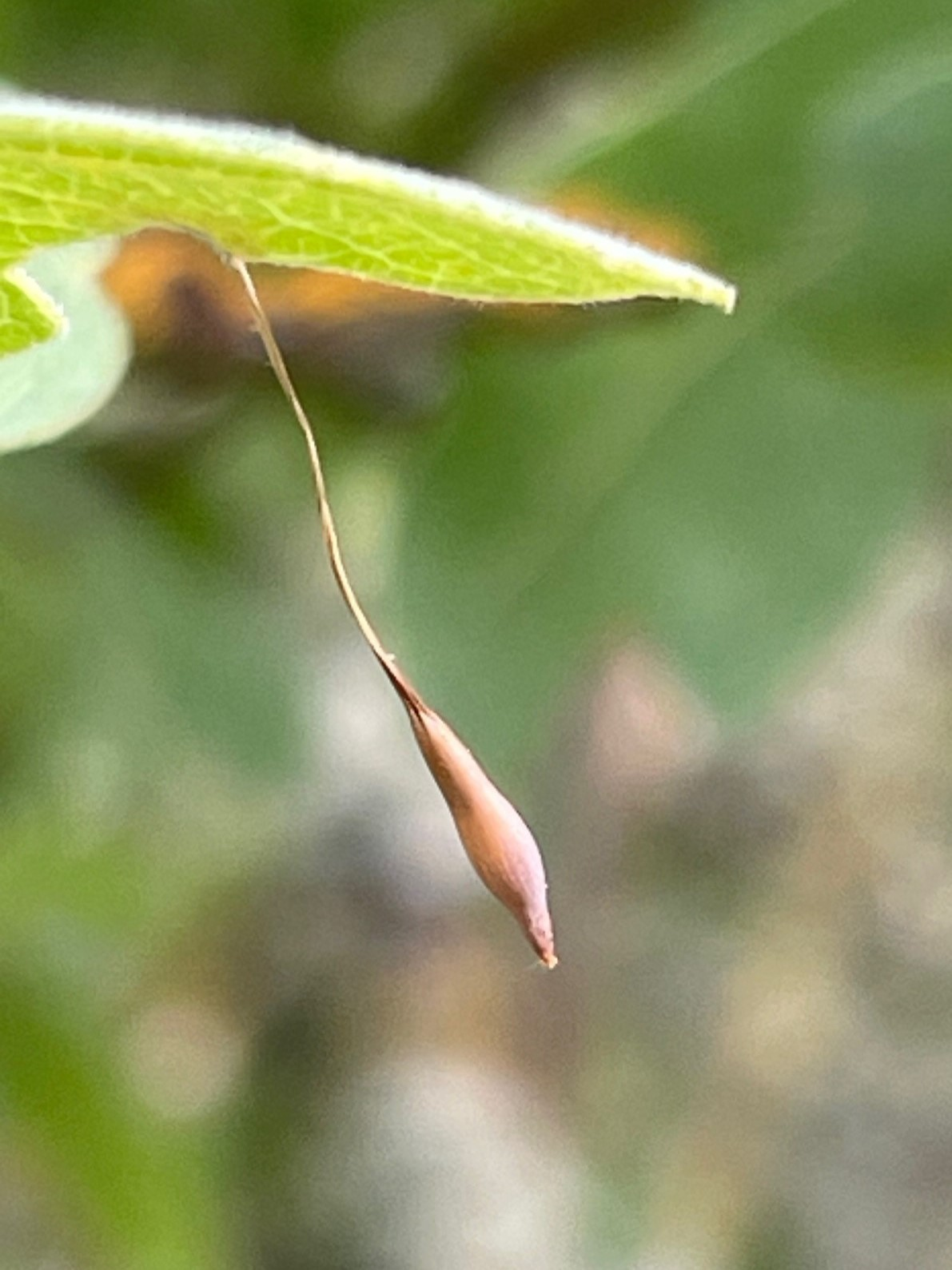
A gall formed by the bisexual generation of Feron pattersonae

Like most oak gall wasps, the plate gall wasp has two alternating generations a year: a parthenogenic all-female generation, and a bisexual generation. The all-female generation produces galls in summer that are flat and circular with scalloped edges. Attached to the underside of leaves, these galls are initially green, then yellow, and fade to brown. They are 7–9 mm in diameter and have a single larval chamber.

The bisexual generation's galls were thought by scientist Alfred Kinsey in 1922 to belong to a new species, Andricus pedicellatus. These galls consist of a pointed capsule at the end of a hair-like stem.
