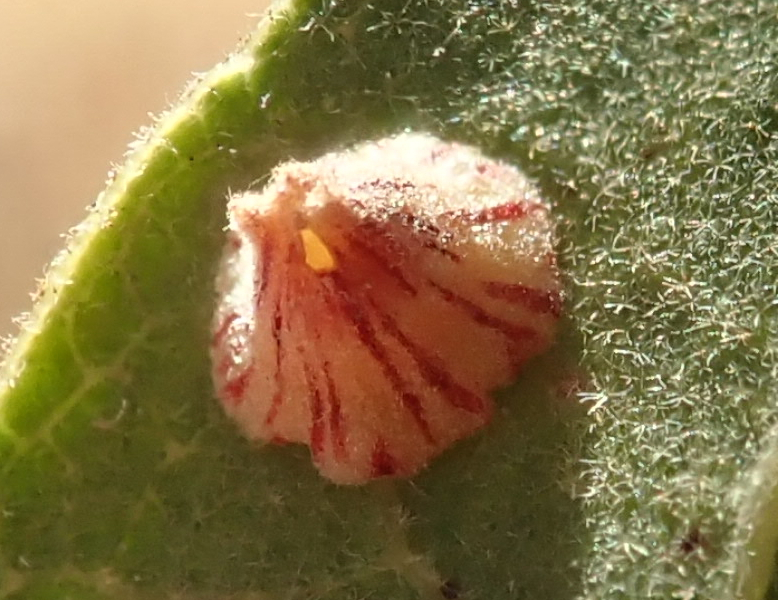
- The gall induced by the unisexual generation of Feron atrimentum

Scientific classification
- Kingdom: Animalia
- Phylum: Arthropoda
- Class: Insecta
- Order: Hymenoptera
- Family: Cynipidae
- Genus: Feron
- Species: F. atrimentum

Binomial name
- Feron atrimentum Kinsey, 1922

Synonyms
- Andricus atrimentus

= Feron atrimentum =

Species of wasp

Feron atrimentum, also known as the striped volcano gall wasp, is a species of gall-forming wasp in the genus Feron. It induces galls on blue oak leaves. Like other oak gall wasps, it has two generations: a bisexual generation, and a parthenogenic female generation. The bisexual generation produces round, 3–4 millimetres (0.12–0.16 in) galls in spring that start as green or pink, and then turn brown. The unisexual generation produces conical, 4–4 millimetres (0.16–0.16 in) galls in summer that are pale with red stripes.

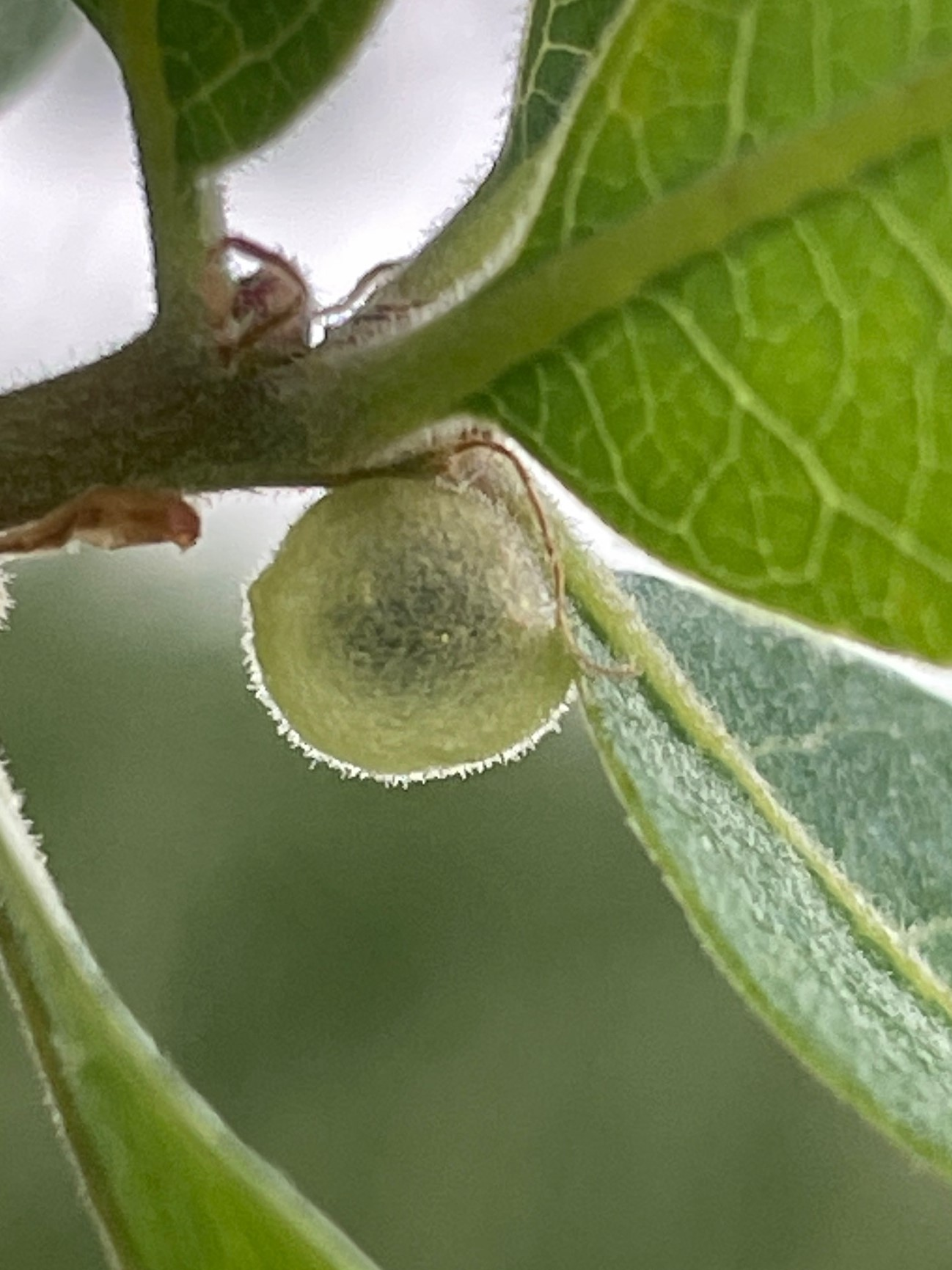
A gall induced by the bisexual generation of Feron atrimentum.
