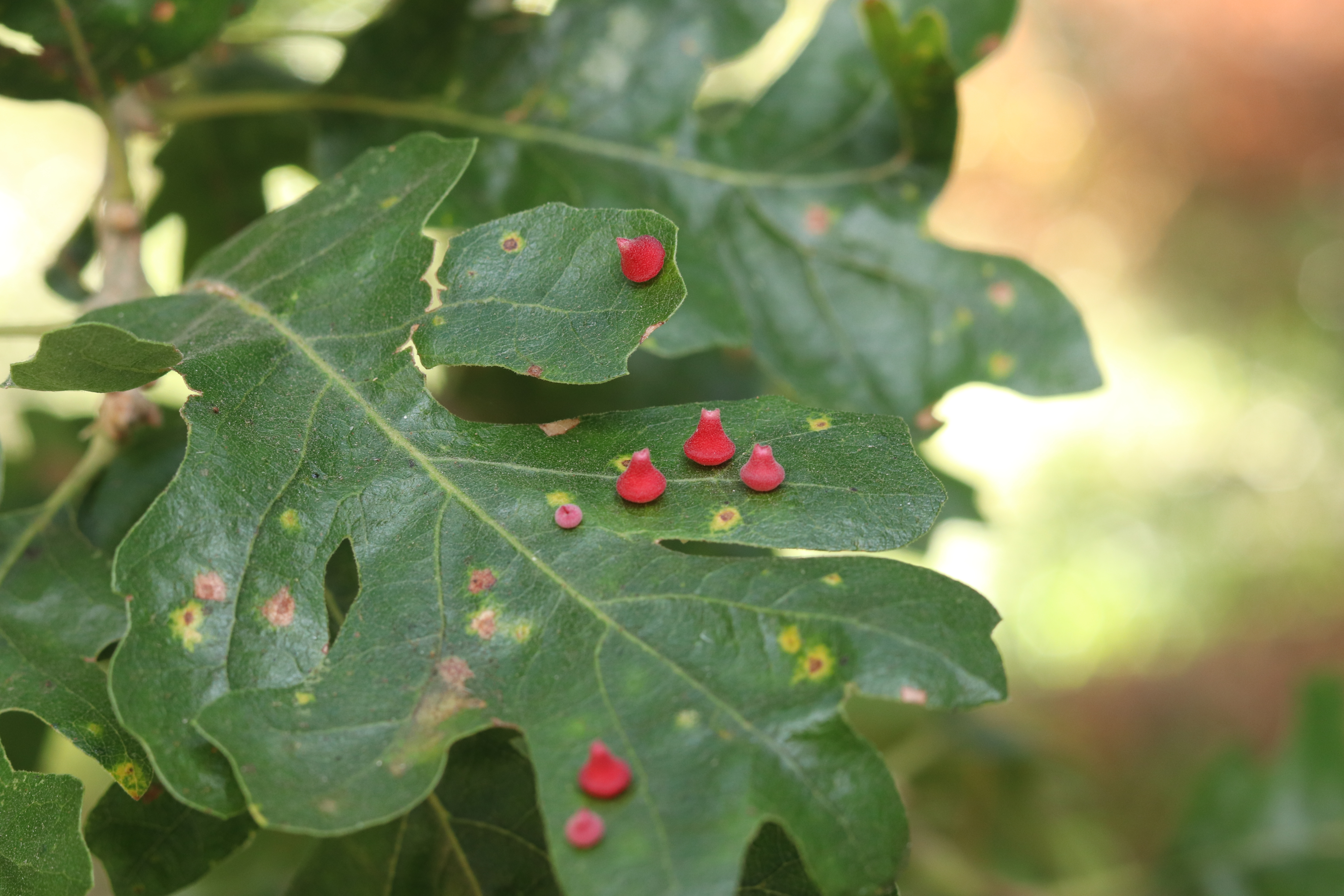
- The galls formed by Feron kingi

Scientific classification
- Kingdom: Animalia
- Phylum: Arthropoda
- Class: Insecta
- Order: Hymenoptera
- Family: Cynipidae
- Genus: Feron
- Species: F. kingi

Binomial name
- Feron kingi Bassett, 1900

Synonyms
- Andricus kingi

= Feron kingi =

Species of wasp

Feron kingi, the red cone gall wasp, is a species of gall wasp in the family Cynipidae.

This species induces galls on various white oak species, such as the valley oak Quercus lobata. The galls housing the parthenogenetic females are detachable red cones measuring about 5 mm tall. These form on either side of the leaves, often with many forming per leaf. Adults emerge in winter from the tip of the cone.
