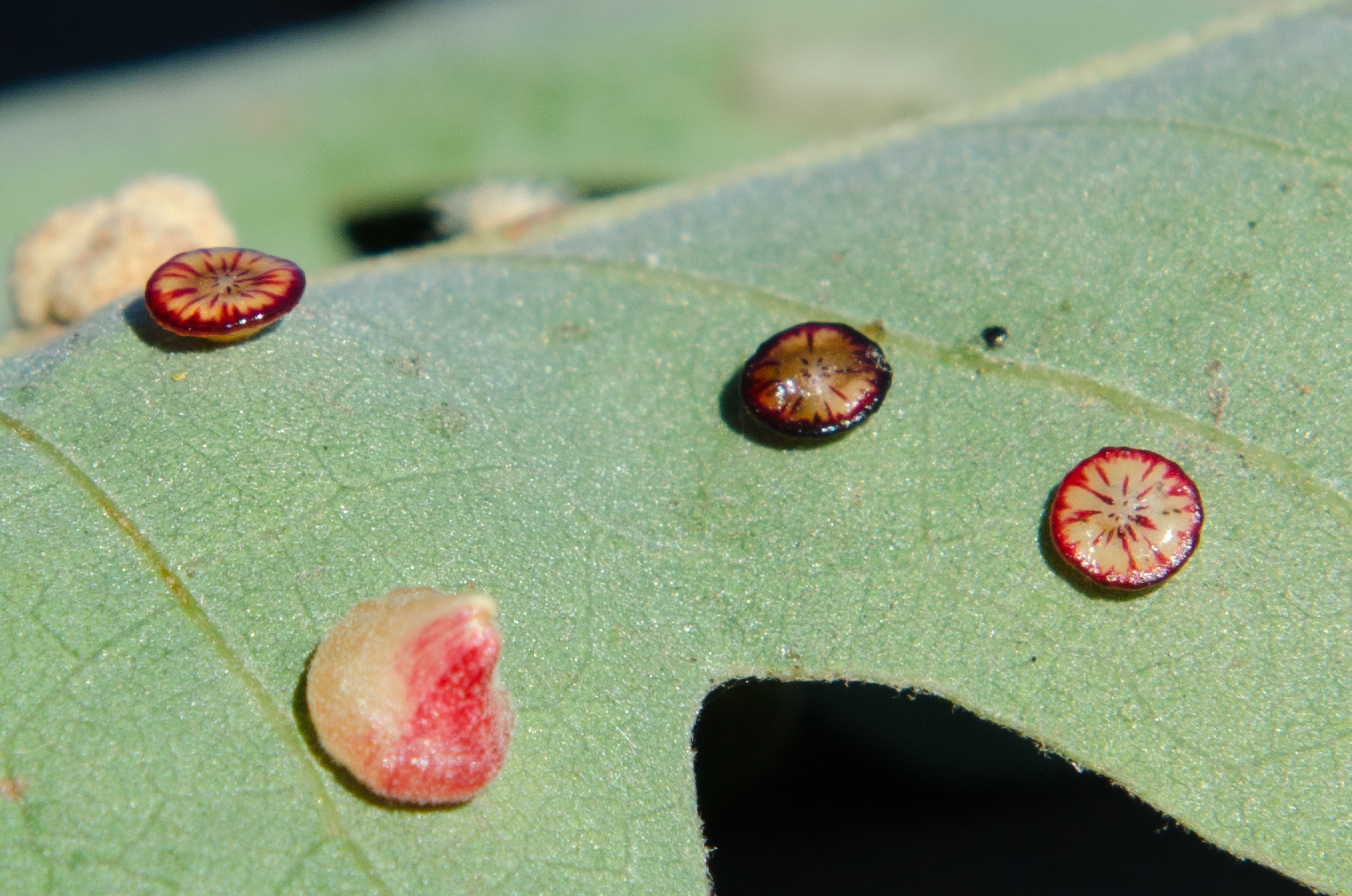
- The galls formed by Feron kingi (bottom left) and Feron parmula (across center) on an oak leaf

Scientific classification
- Kingdom: Animalia
- Phylum: Arthropoda
- Clade: Pancrustacea
- Class: Insecta
- Order: Hymenoptera
- Family: Cynipidae
- Tribe: Cynipini
- Genus: Feron; Kinsey, 1937

Synonyms
- Andricus Hartig, 1840

= Feron (wasp) =

Genus of insects

Feron is a genus of oak gall wasps in the Nearctic. It was established by Alfred Kinsey in 1937, then re-established in 2023.

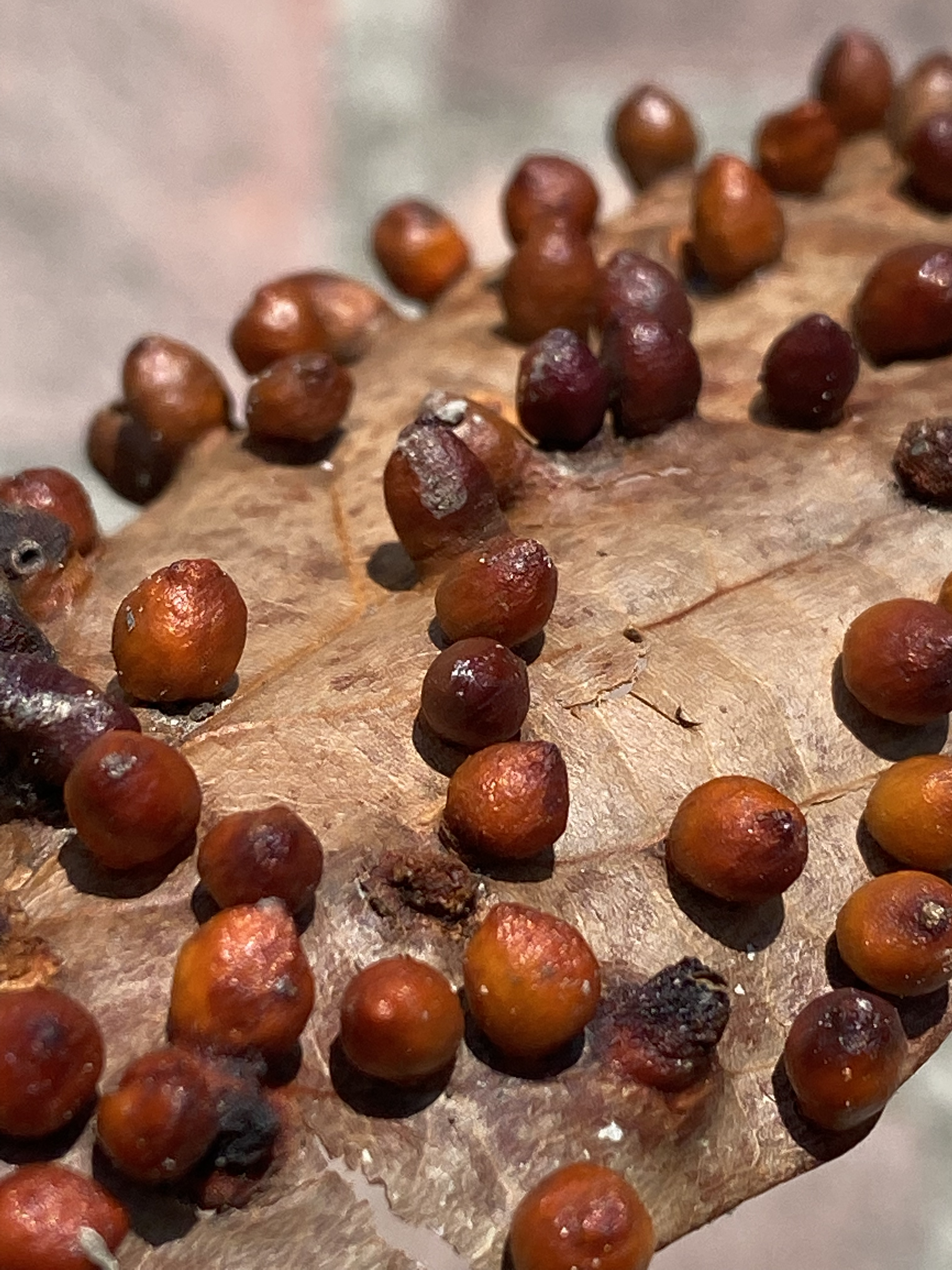
Galls from a Feron specie of gall wasp

== Species ==
The following species are grouped into Feron:

- Feron albicomus (Weld, 1952)
- Feron amphorus (Weld, 1926)
- Feron apiarium (Weld, 1944)
- Feron atrimentum (Kinsey, 1922)
- Feron bakkeri (Lyon, 1984)
- Feron caepula (Weld, 1926)
- Feron californicum (Beutenmueller, 1911)
- Feron clarkei (Bassett, 1890)
- Feron comatum (Weld, 1952)
- Feron crystallinum (Bassett, 1900)
- Feron cylindratum (Kinsey, 1937)
- Feron discale (Weld, 1926)
- Feron discularis (Weld, 1926)
- Feron dumosae (Weld, 1957)
- Feron gigas (Kinsey, 1922)
- Feron izabellae (Melika, Nicholls & Stone)
- Feron kingi (Bassett, 1900)
- Feron parmula (Bassett, 1900)
- Feron pattersonae (Fullaway, 1911)
- Feron roberti (Melika, Nicholls & Stone)
- Feron rucklei (Melika, Nicholls & Stone)
- Feron scutellum (Weld, 1930)
- Feron serranoae (Pujade-Villar & Cuesta-Porta)
- Feron splendens (Weld, 1919)
- Feron stellare (Weld, 1926)
- Feron stellulum (Burnett, 1974)
- Feron sulfureum (Weld, 1926)
- Feron syndicorum (Pujade-Villar & Cuesta-Porta)
- Feron tecturnarum (Kinsey, 1920)
- Feron tetyanae (Melika)
- Feron tibiale (Kinsey, 1937)
- Feron tubifaciens (Weld, 1926)
- Feron verutum (Kinsey, 1937)
- Feron vitreum (Kinsey, 1937)
