= Feron crystallinum =

Species of wasp

== Overview ==
Feron crystallinum
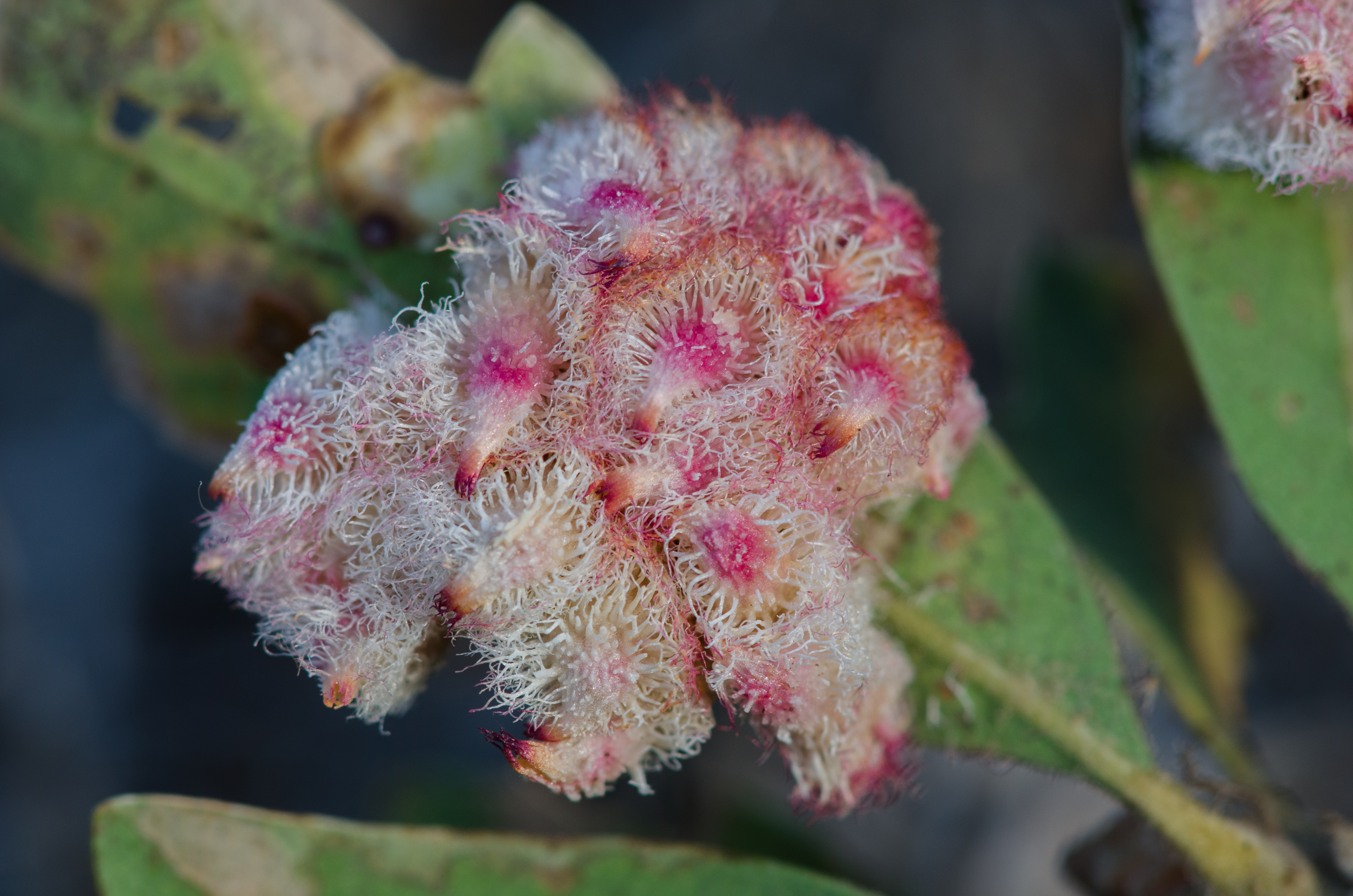
- The galls formed by the unisexual generation of F. crystallinum
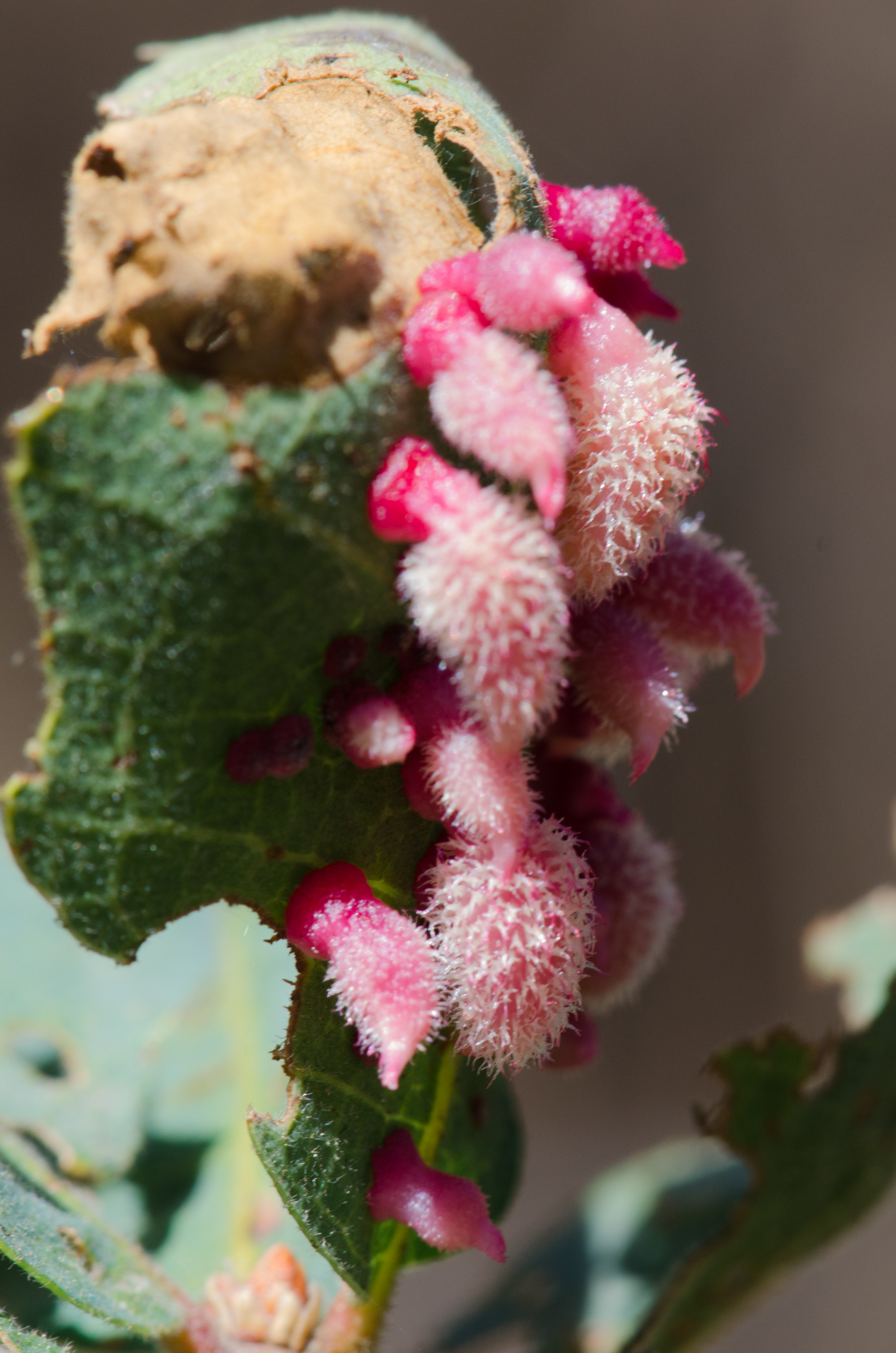
- Galls formed by generation of F. crystallinum

Scientific classification
- Kingdom: Animalia
- Phylum: Arthropoda
- Class: Insecta
- Order: Hymenoptera
- Family: Cynipidae
- Genus: Feron
- Species: F. crystallinum

Binomial name
- Feron crystallinum Bassett, 1900

Synonyms
- Andricus crystallinus

Feron crystallinum, also known as the crystalline gall wasp, is a species of gall-forming wasp in the genus Feron. The former name of the Feron crystallinum is Andricus crystallinus. Galls in plants are tissues formed on the plant through either the saliva of an insect, which can reprogram a plant resulting in the abnormal growth; irritation, or infection caused by fungi, bacteria, or eggs that were laid by insects. The galls of its all-female parthenogenic generation are pink and covered in hairs that are white, red, or brown. These galls are often massed together in clumps that can cover the underside of leaves. Individual galls are 12–14 mm high, 7 mm across, and have a single chamber for larvae. The lower chamber is where larvae develop out of two chambers in the gall. The body of a gall can end with an extended neck when they are of considerable size. This generation emerges in late winter. In the spring, the bisexual generation of males and females induces much smaller galls with shorter hairs. The unisexual generation takes place on the underside of leaves in the fall and summer, while the bisexual generation can be found on the upper side. F. crystallinum galls are found in all species of oaks in California.

== Identification ==
There are various types of female F. crystallinum in the different generations, which include the sexual generation, the bisexual generation, the asexual generation, and the unisexual generation. The female that correlates with the sexual generation is typically black, and it is usually darker than the male counterparts with the exception of the antennae, while the female unisexual generation has a reddish tone. The female asexual generation is comparably more of a chestnut color. There have been signs of generational changes in the F. crystallinum due to the galls depicting developed holes.
