= Ronald A. Russo =

American naturalist (b. 1941)

- Born: 1941 (age 84–85)
- Other name: Ron Russo

Ronald A. Russo (born 1941) is an American naturalist who has developed specialties in the biology of leopard sharks, and in plant galls of the western North America, especially the galls of western oak species. He has been a frequent contributor to California Fish and Wildlife Journal.

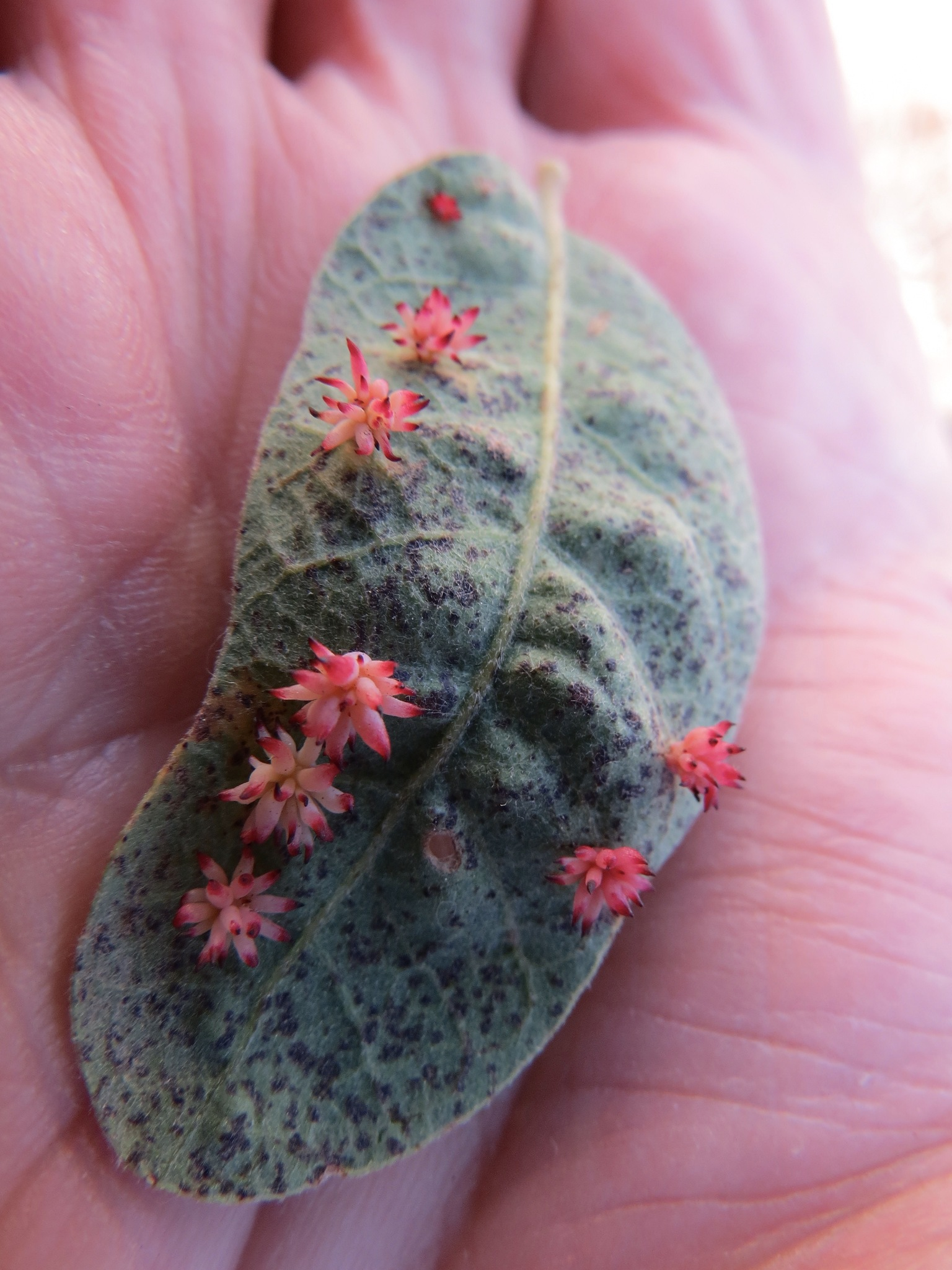
Urchin galls observed in Butte County, California, 2020

He has been called a "gall guru." His interest in plant galls was initially triggered by urchin galls, first seen when he worked as a full-time park naturalist in the East Bay region of California. Per Russo, California oak trees are galled by over 200 species of cynipid wasp, as well as other insects, fungi, etc.

== Selected works ==
- Plant Galls of the California Region, Boxwood Press, 1970
- Field Guide to Plant Galls of California and Other Western States, University of California Press, 1986 (reprinted 2009)
- Plant Galls of the Western United States, Princeton University Press, 2021
