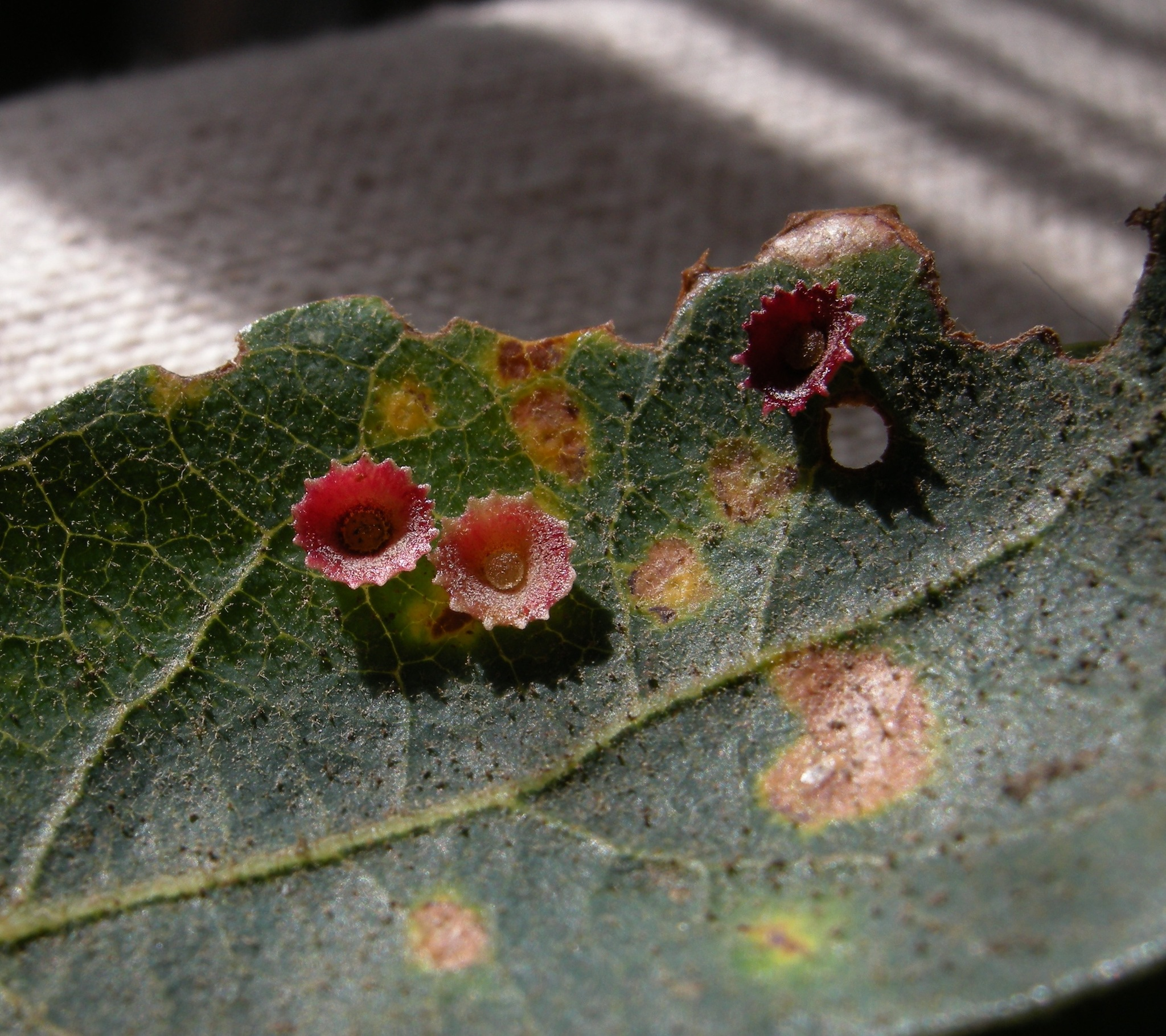
- Galls formed by the unisexual generation of F. gigas

Scientific classification
- Kingdom: Animalia
- Phylum: Arthropoda
- Class: Insecta
- Order: Hymenoptera
- Family: Cynipidae
- Genus: Feron
- Species: F. gigas

Binomial name
- Feron gigas Kinsey, 1922

Synonyms
- Andricus gigas

= Feron gigas =

Species of wasp

Feron gigas, also known as the saucer gall wasp, is a species of gall-forming wasp in the genus Feron. It induces galls on the leaves of scrub oaks, blue oaks, and Engelmann oaks. The galls produced by its all-female generation, which emerges in winter, are 3–4 mm wide, circular with raised edges. They are red, pink, brown, or purple. The larval chamber exists as a raised bump in the gall's center. The bisexual generation produces galls that are brown and cone-shaped.
