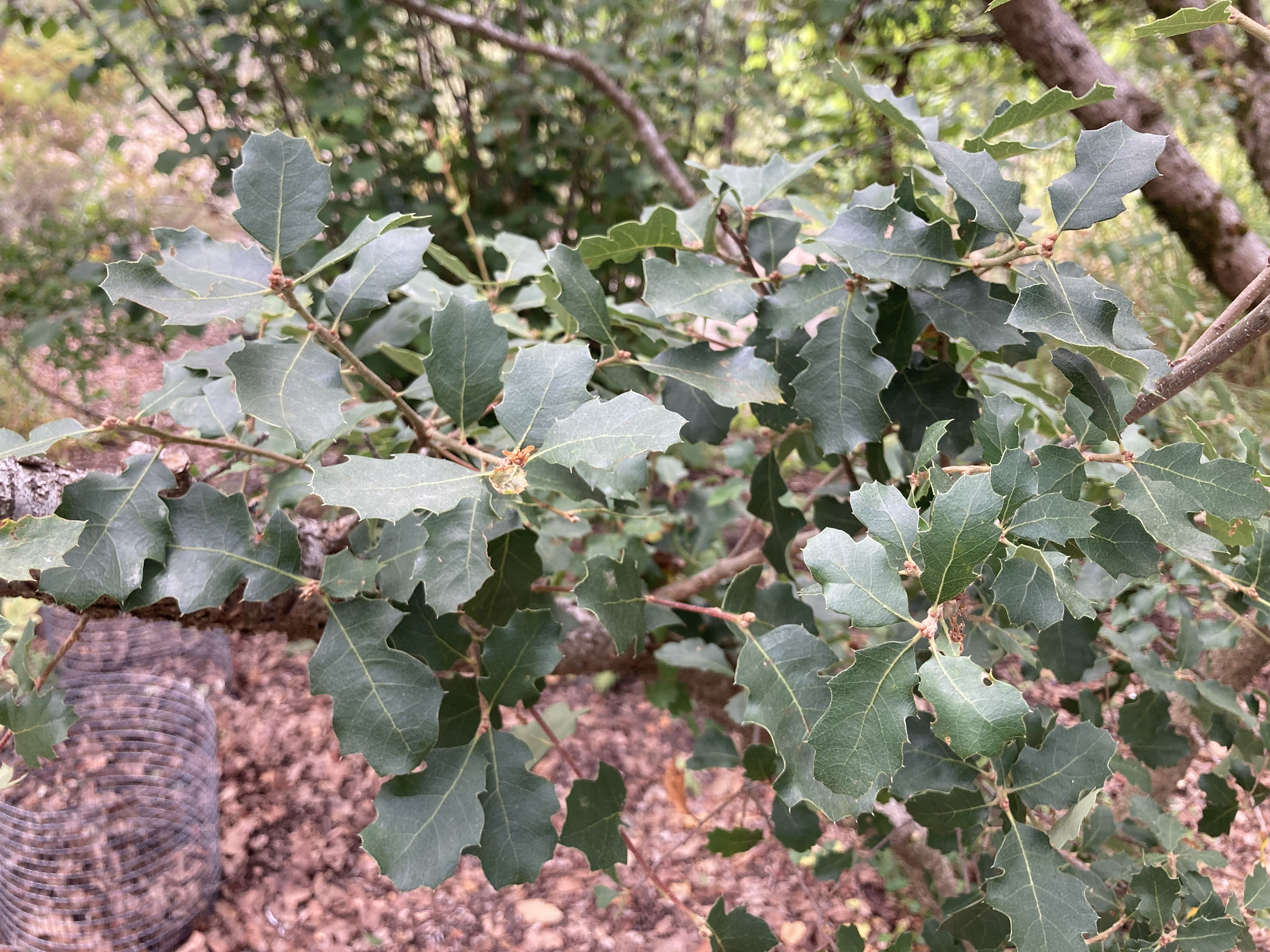
- Quercus berberidifolia

Conservation status
- Least Concern (IUCN 3.1)

Scientific classification
- Kingdom: Plantae
- Clade: Embryophytes
- Clade: Tracheophytes
- Clade: Spermatophytes
- Clade: Angiosperms
- Clade: Eudicots
- Clade: Rosids
- Order: Fagales
- Family: Fagaceae
- Genus: Quercus
- Subgenus: Quercus subg. Quercus
- Section: Quercus sect. Quercus
- Species: Q. berberidifolia

Binomial name
- Quercus berberidifolia Liebm.

Synonyms
- Quercus agrifolia var. berberidifolia (Liebm.) Wenz.; Quercus dumosa f. berberidifolia (Liebm.) Trel.; Quercus dumosa var. munita Greene

= Quercus berberidifolia =

California scrub oak

Species of flowering plant

Quercus berberidifolia, commonly known as the California scrub oak or barberry-leaved scrub oak, is a species of scrub oak in the white oak section of Quercus. It is a shrub typically reaching heights of 1–2 metres (3 1/2–6 1/2 ft), characterized by its shiny green leaves, minute rayed trichomes on the lower leaf surface, and barrel-shaped acorns. Native to the United States and Mexico, it is one of the most common scrub oaks in central and southern California, and is found usually in chaparral at mid-elevations from the foothills of the Sierra Nevada to the California Coast Ranges and south into Baja California near Ensenada.

== Description ==
Quercus berberidifolia grows to 1–2 metres (3 1/2–6 1/2 ft) tall, rarely to 4 m (13 ft). In cooler, more exposed areas, scrub oak is usually a small, compact shrub, but in warm or sheltered areas the plant can spread out and grow several meters high.

It has oval to egg-shaped, sharply toothed, dull green leaves which are 1.4–3 centimetres (1/2–1 1/8 inches) long and 1–2 cm (1/2–1 in) broad, leathery on their top surfaces and somewhat hairy underneath. Male and female catkins grow on the same plant, blooming as at the leaves unfurl. The trichomes are minute and flat, with a stellate shape and 7 to 8 rays.

The solitary or paired brown acorns are 1–3 cm (1/2–1 in) long and 1–2 cm (1/2–1 in) broad, with a barrel-like shape and a rounded or blunted tip; they mature in about 6–8 months after pollination.

== Taxonomy ==
Quercus berberidifolia was formerly grouped into Quercus dumosa (Q. dumosa sensu lato), before the latter species was revised into a more narrow definition (Q. dumosa sensu stricto). Q. berberidifolia is the most widespread member to be segregated out of Q. dumosa, and is distinguished by its 7 to 8 rayed stellate trichomes on the lower leaf surface, a relatively flat waxy leaf, and usually barrel-shaped acorns with rounded or blunt tips.

The former status of Quercus berberidifolia is a source of confusion when determining which taxon is actually being discussed in literature created before the 21st century. Most references to Q. dumosa in older literature actually apply to Q. berberidifolia, but it can also refer to other species represented by Q. dumosa sensu lato, like Quercus cornelius-mulleri, depending on the context.

=== Hybridization ===
Quercus berberidifolia hybridizes with a number of other species, as hybridization, hybrid swarms, and introgression are common among the white scrub oaks. In the north-central coastal area of San Diego County, from Del Mar to Carlsbad and Poway, populations of Quercus dumosa grow and hybridize freely with Q. berberidifolia. Putative hybrids of these same parents also occur at elevations above the populations of Q. dumosa in Santa Barbara County. Putative hybrids with Quercus john-tuckeri are also noticeable in the mountains above Ventura County and on the north slope of the Tehachapi Mountains. It may also hybridize with Quercus durata, Quercus engelmannii, Quercus lobata, and Quercus garryana.

Quercus × howellii Tucker, commonly known as Howell's oak, is a named hybrid that is a cross between Q. berberidifolia and Q. garryana. It has been found in Sonoma and Marin counties.

Quercus pacifica possibly represents a nothospecies derived from intergradation between Q. berberidifolia and Q. douglasii on the California Channel Islands.

=== Etymology ===
The specific epithet berberidifolia means with leaves like those of Berberis, or the barberry. It is commonly known as the California scrub oak or barberry-leaved scrub oak.

== Distribution and habitat ==
=== Distribution ===
Quercus berberidifolia is native to the U.S. state of California and the Mexican state of Baja California. It is found from the foothills of the Sierra Nevada and the California Coast Ranges south into northwestern Baja California, where it reaches its southern limit near Ensenada.

Quercus berberidifolia is one of the most common scrub oaks in central and southern California. It is usually found in mid-elevations from 100–1,800 m (330–5,910 ft) in chaparral and the margins of coastal sage scrub. In drier interior habitats it is replaced by Q. john-tuckeri in central California and south of the Transverse Ranges by Q. cornelius-mulleri. South of Santa Barbara at low elevations near the coast it is replaced by Q. dumosa, like in the fog belt of San Diego County.

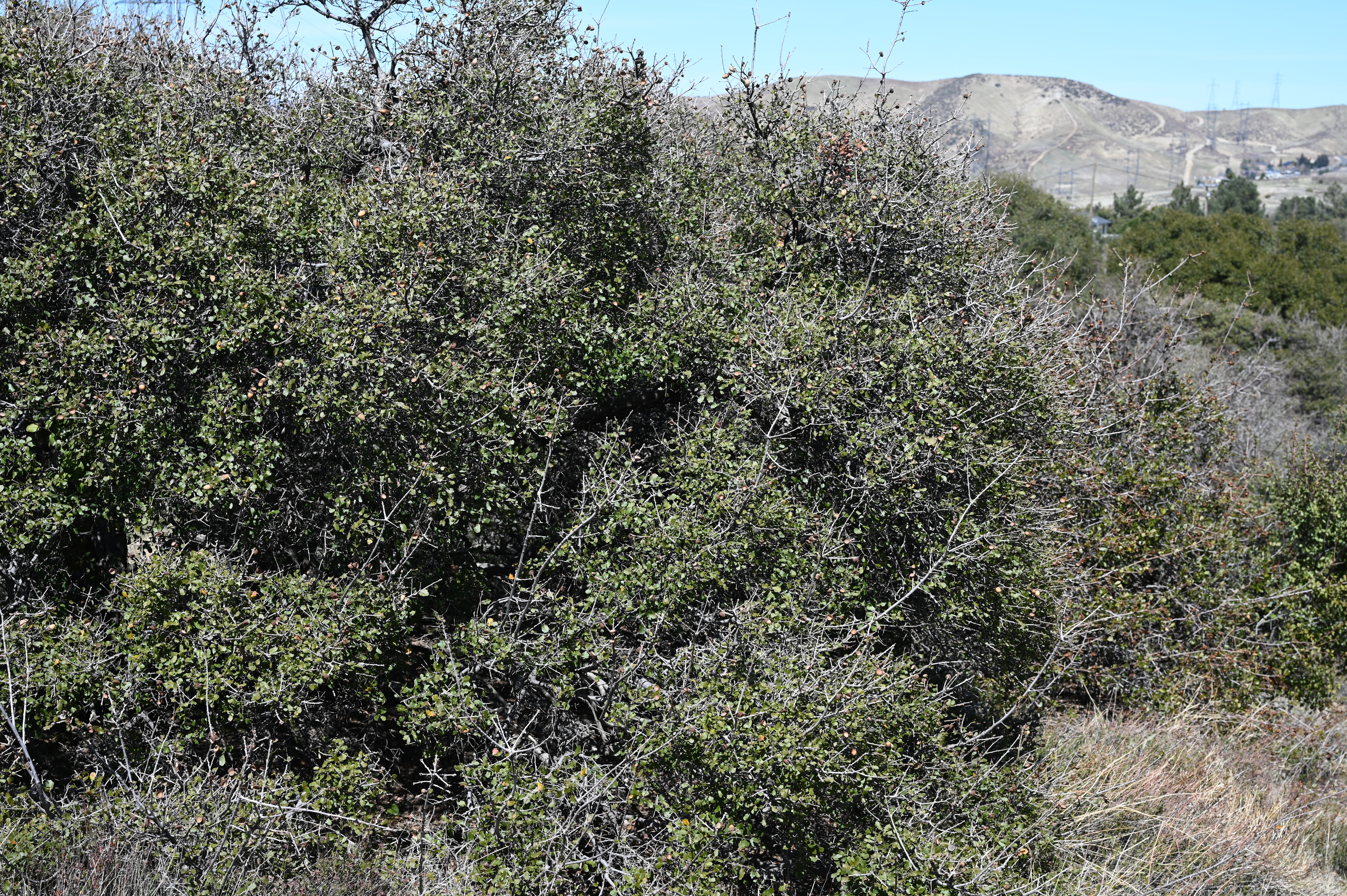
The habit of Quercus berberidifolia

=== Habitat ===
In northern California, Quercus berberidifolia occurs in mixed-chaparral communities, usually on mesic slopes. On the western slopes of the Sierra Nevada from Tehama County south, it is an important to dominant component of chaparral. Associated species include chamise (Adenostoma fasciculatum), interior live oak (Quercus wislizeni), manzanita (Arctostaphylos spp.), ceanothus, toyon (Heteromeles arbutifolia), yerba santa (Eriodictyon californicum), and California buckeye (Aesculus californica). In the North Coast Ranges, it co-dominates mixed-chaparral communities with chamise. Q. berberidifolia is also found in the understory of woodlands, and is usually associated with blue oak (Q. douglasii) woodlands. In the Central Valley it is also occasional in riparian communities.

In southern California, Q. berberidifolia dominates some scrub oak, mixed, and maritime chaparral types, with chamise, ceanothus, and manzanita as co-dominant species. With the exception of maritime chaparral, these types usually are found on north-facing slopes. In the San Bernardino Mountains, it dominates low elevation slopes, and occurs in mixed stands with other species at higher elevations. In the Tehachapi Mountains, the most common chaparral type consists of Ceanothus cuneatus and Q. berberidifolia chaparral, occurring at low elevations in discontinuous strips. It is also found in woodland habitats in southern California, like in San Diego County, where it occurs in the understory of Tecate cypress (Hesperocyparis forbesii) stands. It is also found in some pine woodland communities, like those of the San Bernardino, Santa Ana, and the Cuyamaca mountains.

== Uses ==
The acorn is edible.

== Gallery ==
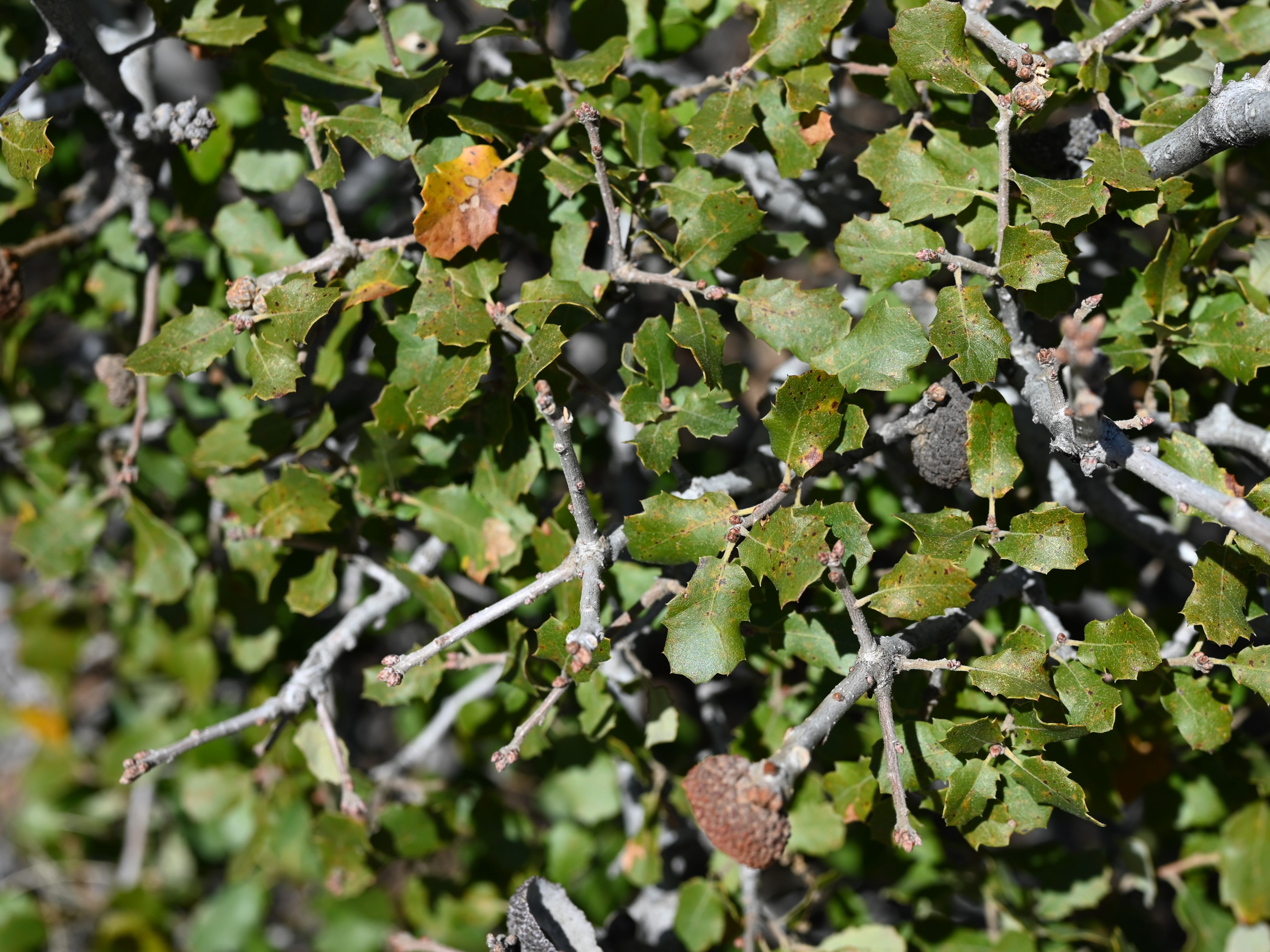
The dense leaves

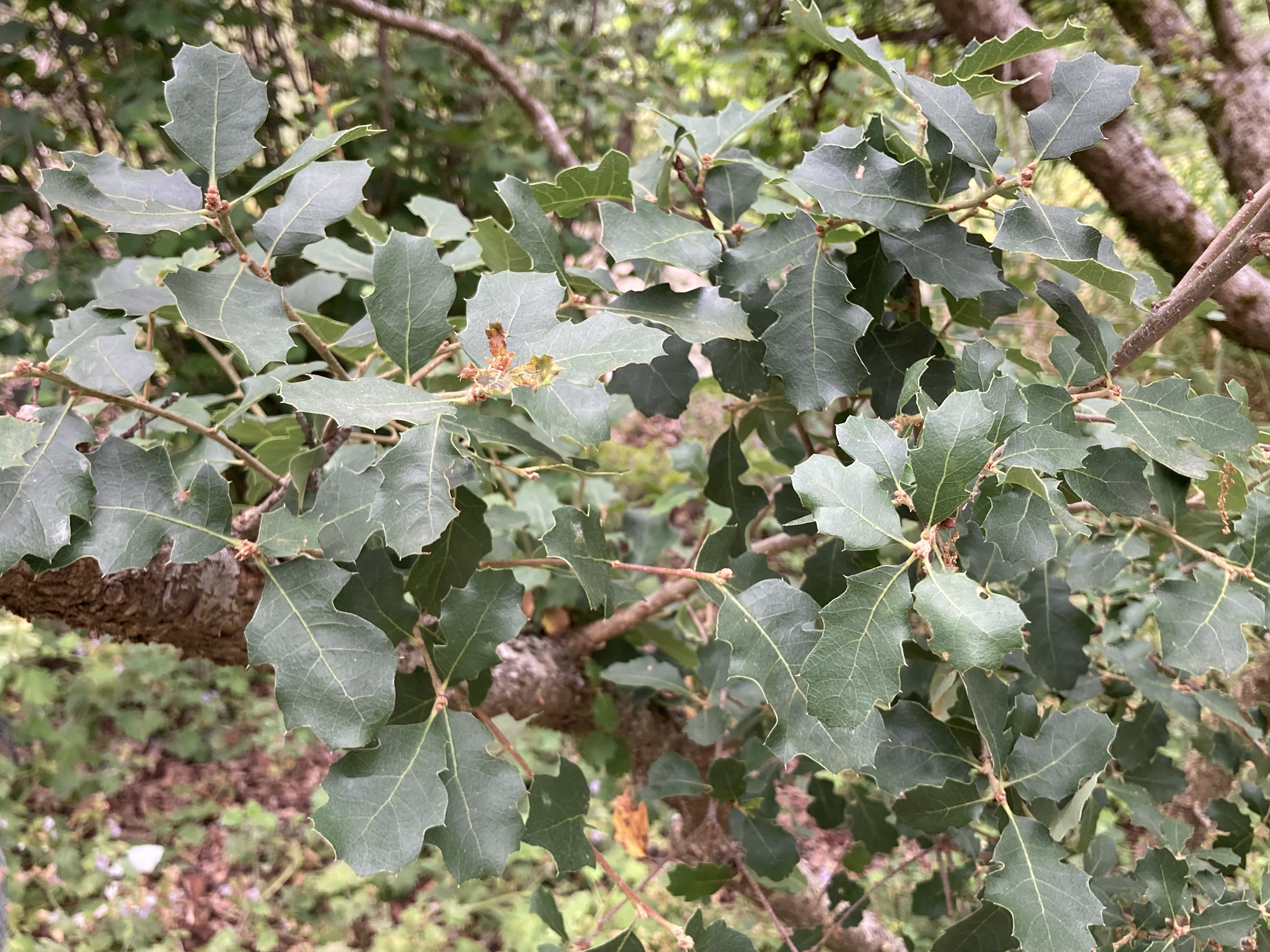
Leaves at the Berkeley Botanical Garden

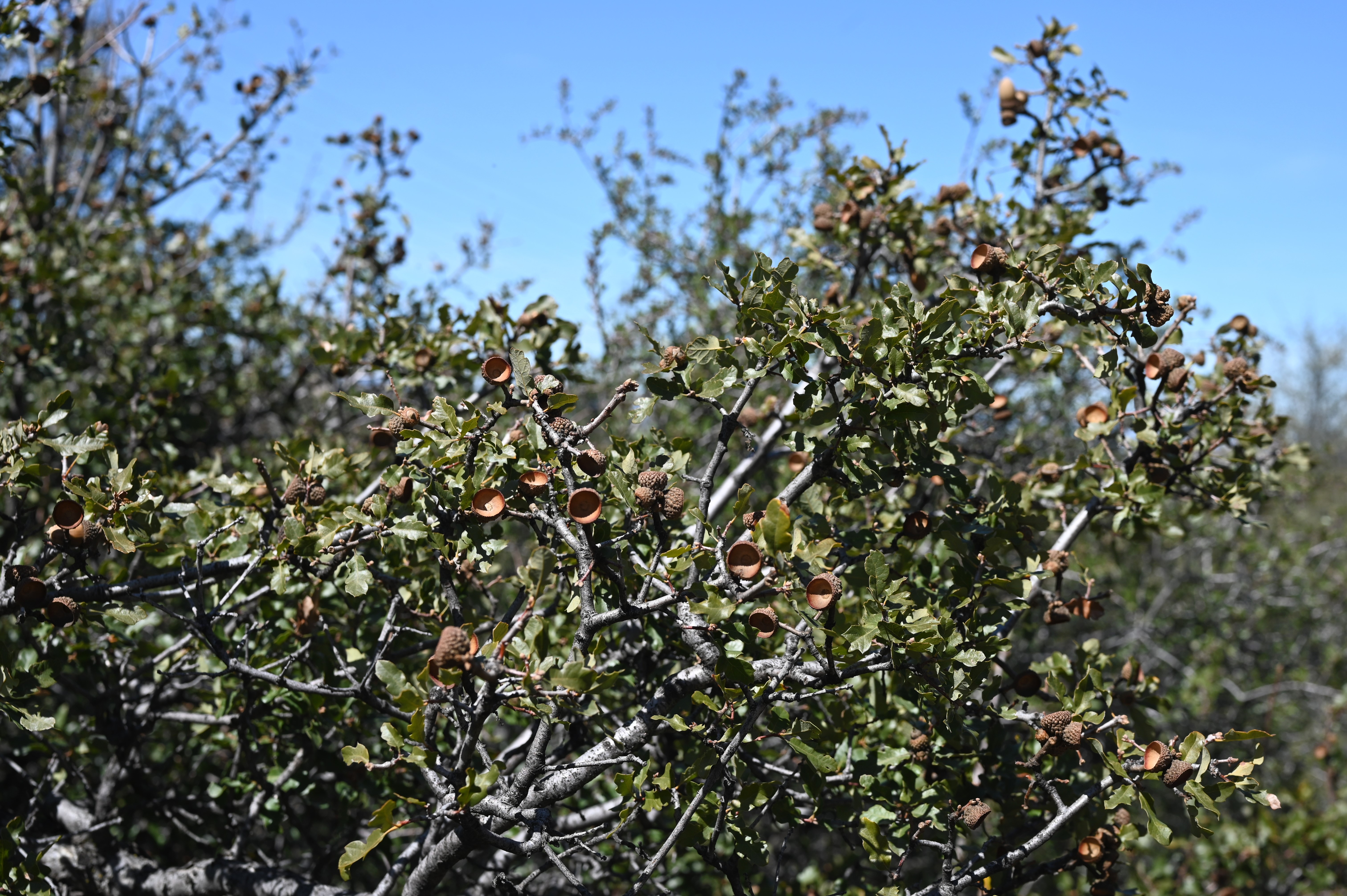
Scrubby growth

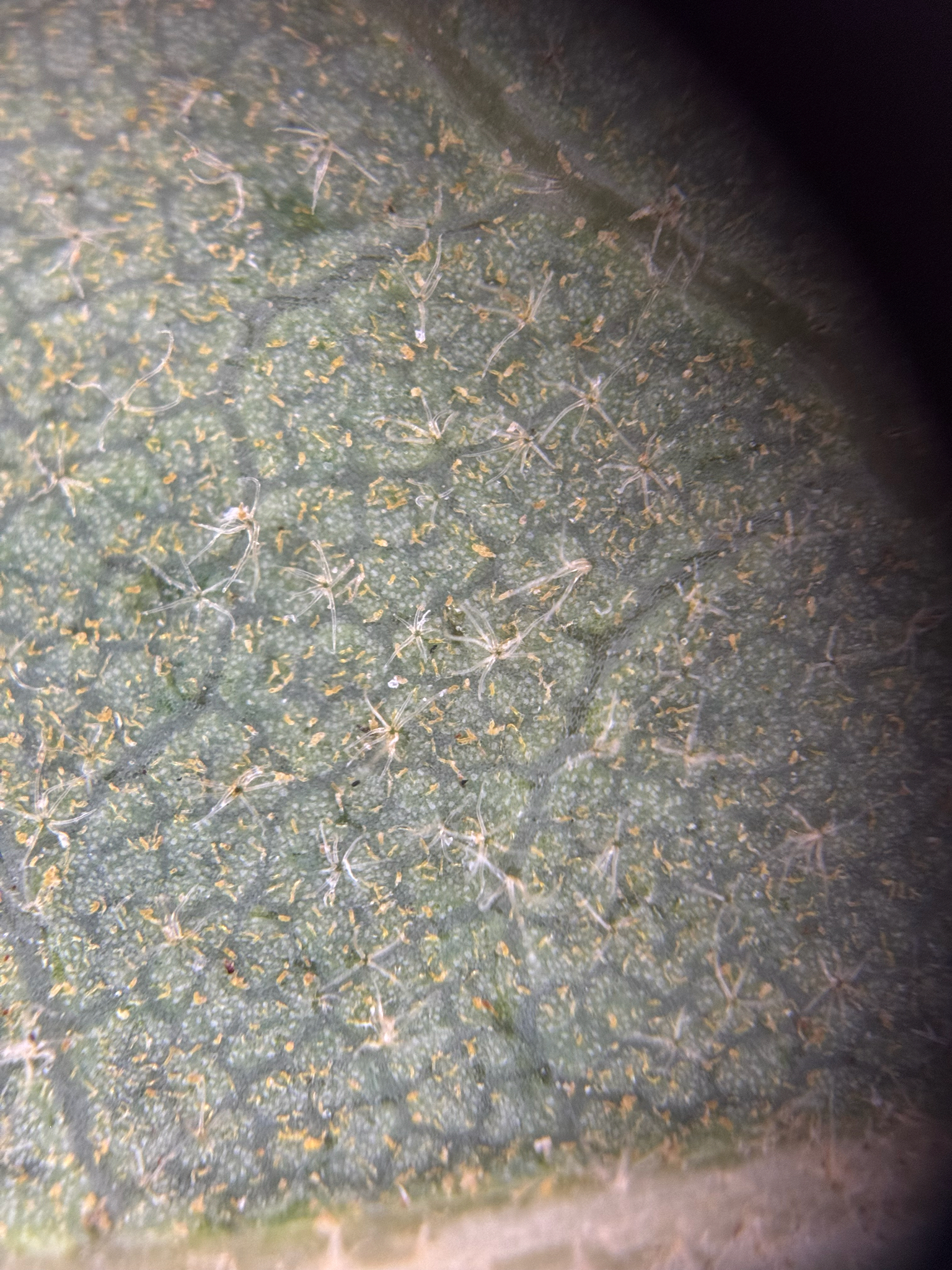
The trichomes on the lower leaf surface

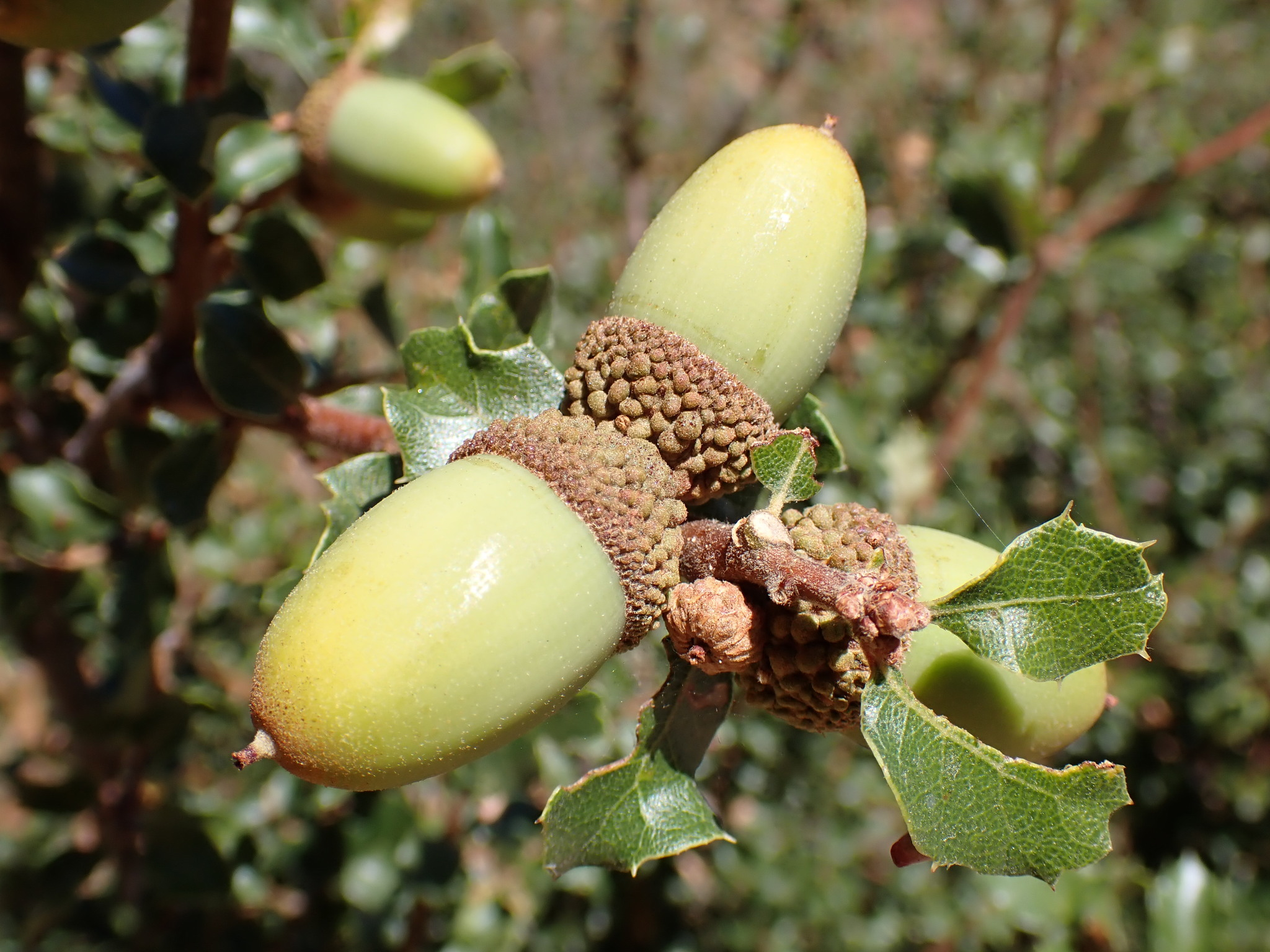
The leaves and acorns

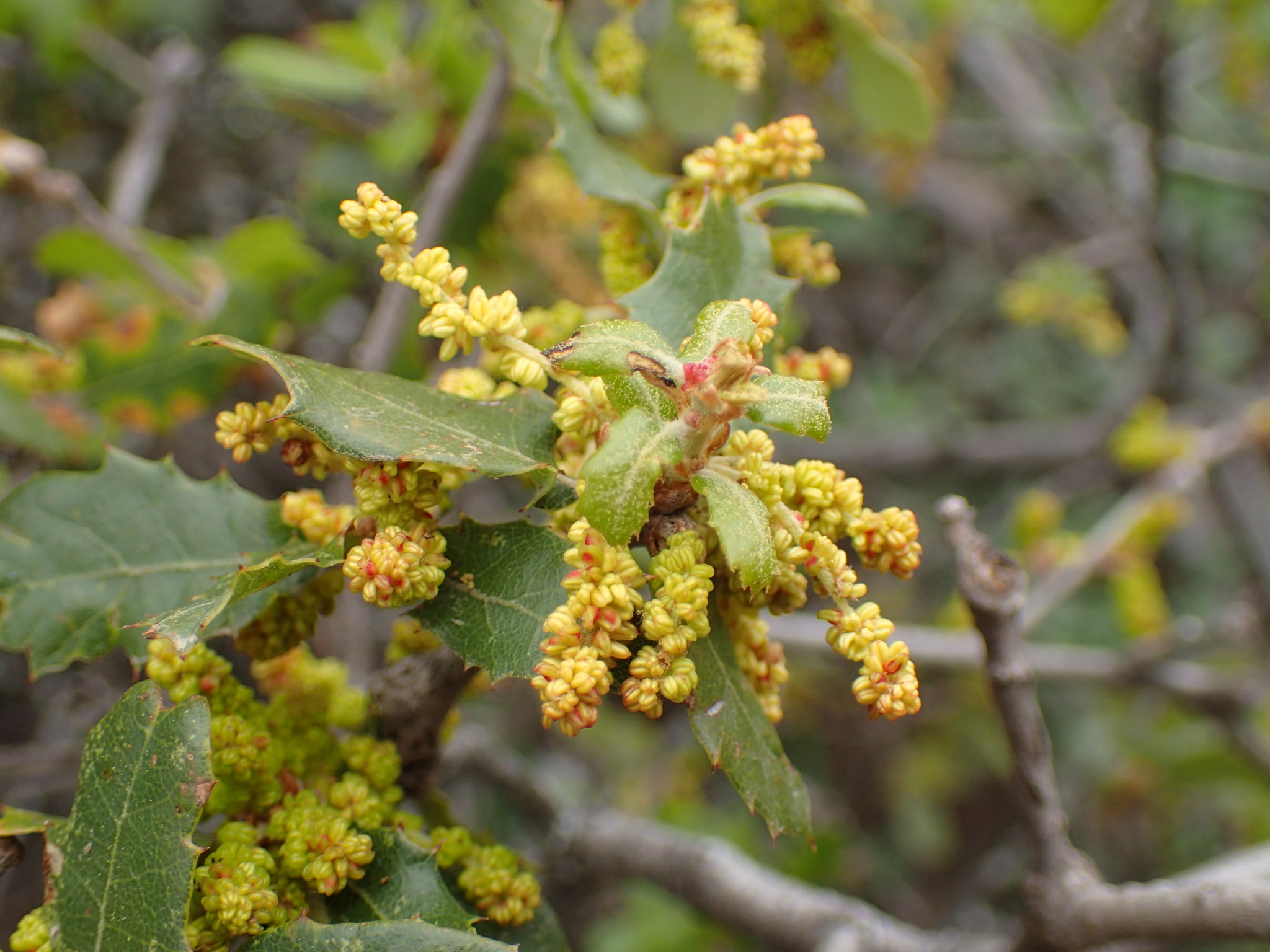
The catkins (male flowers)
