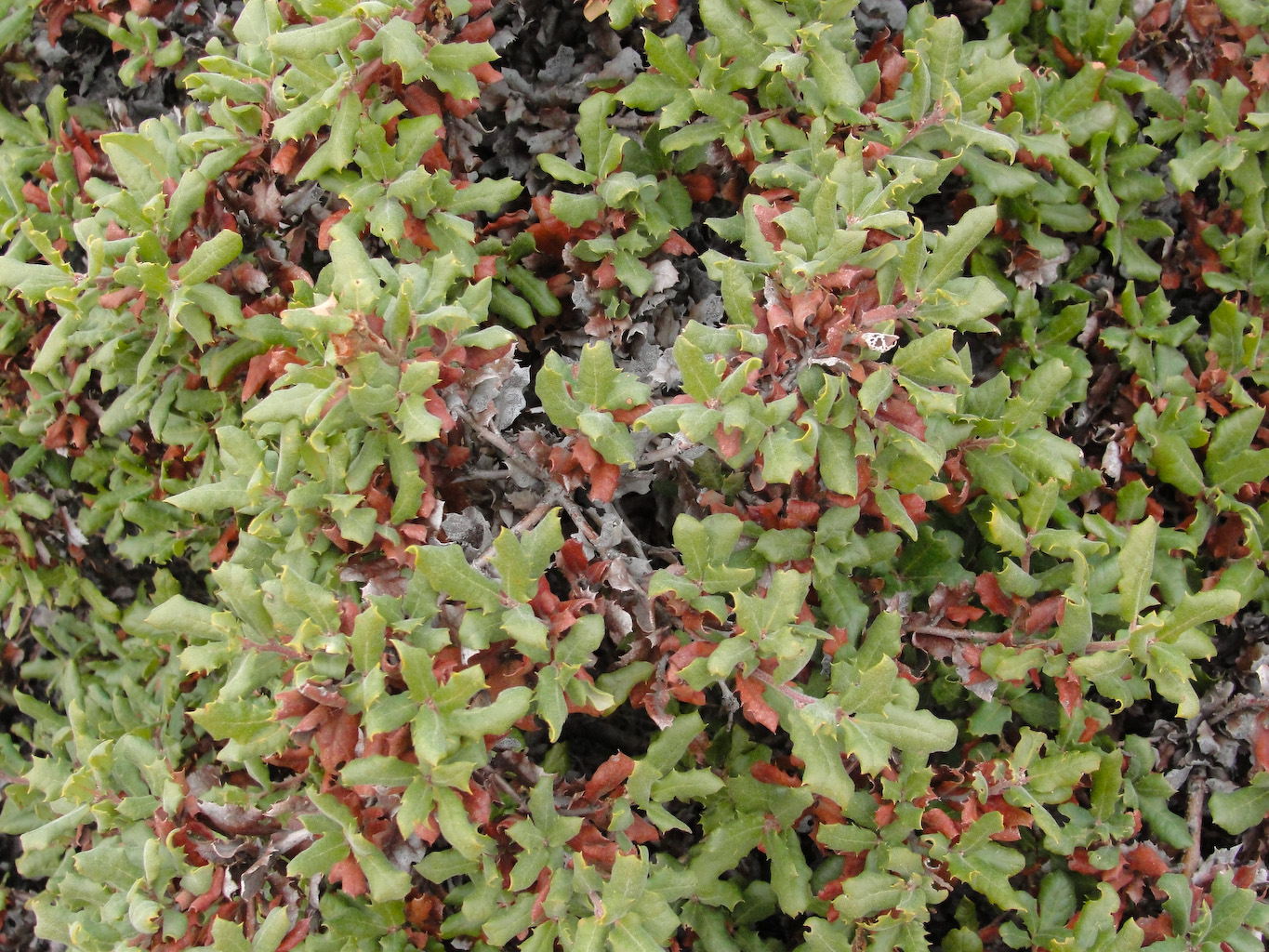
- var. durata

Conservation status
- Least Concern (IUCN 3.1)

Scientific classification
- Kingdom: Plantae
- Clade: Embryophytes
- Clade: Tracheophytes
- Clade: Spermatophytes
- Clade: Angiosperms
- Clade: Eudicots
- Clade: Rosids
- Order: Fagales
- Family: Fagaceae
- Genus: Quercus
- Subgenus: Quercus subg. Quercus
- Section: Quercus sect. Quercus
- Species: Q. durata

Binomial name
- Quercus durata Jeps.
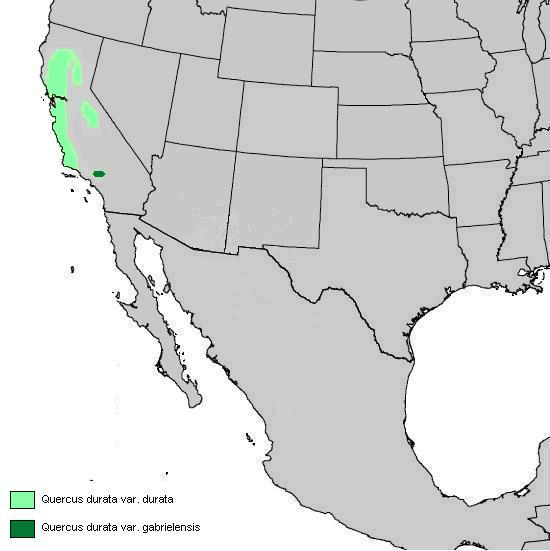
- Natural range of Quercus durata

Synonyms
- Quercus dumosa var. bullata Engelm.; Quercus dumosa subsp. durata (Jeps.) A.Camus; Quercus dumosa var. revoluta Sarg.; Quercus durata var. durata

= Quercus durata =

Leather Oak

Species of oak tree

Quercus durata, commonly known as leather oak, is a species of oak in the white oak group (subgenus Quercus, section Quercus). The common name "leather oak" is derived from the leathery texture on the lop of its leaves.

It is endemic to California, common in the Coast Ranges and the foothills of the Sierra Nevada. It is found nearly exclusively on serpentine soil.

== Description ==
Leather oak is a dicot. As described by English horticulturist and botanist Theodore Payne, it is a "rather low spreading shrub with rigid branches, foliage rich deep green. Desirable for hillside planting." Quercus durata is a short species of oak generally growing to 1–2 metres (3 1/2–6 1/2 feet) in diameter with a height of about 0.5–1.5 m (1 1/2–5 ft). In more extreme cases they have been known to grow to be 3–4 m across. The gray or yellowish twigs have scaly bark and are about 1–3 centimetres (1/2–1 1/4 inches) in diameter with the trunk diameter reaching 4–5 cm; the branches can be densely or sparsely distributed. The buds are smooth brown or reddish brown ovals.

The leaf blades are cupped or convex, rarely somewhat planar; their dimensions are 1.5–3 cm long and 1–1.5 cm broad densely or sparsely distributed along the branches while the margins of the leaves can be entirely or irregularly toothed. The adaxial (upper) surface of the leaves are greenish or yellowish with short semi-erect hairs; the secondary veins are obscure, dense or scattered. The abaxial (lower) surface of the leaves are covered with erect rayed hairs 1–4 millimetres (1/16–3/16 in) in length that are felty to the touch with prominent secondary veins.

It flowers in the spring, typically April or May, with male and female flowers on the same plant. The staminate flowers are in catkins, the pistillate ones singly or in pairs in leaf axils.

The acorns of the leather oak can be found solitary or paired at the end of a small stalk; the cup which encloses up to half of the nut is reddish or yellowish with a scaly texture. The nut itself is cylindrical, measuring 1.5–2.5 cm in diameter and 1–2.5 cm long, the apex can be rounded or obtuse. Because leather oak is a species of white oak, its acorns mature in about 6 months, are hairless inside the acorn shell, and are sweet or slightly bitter tasting.

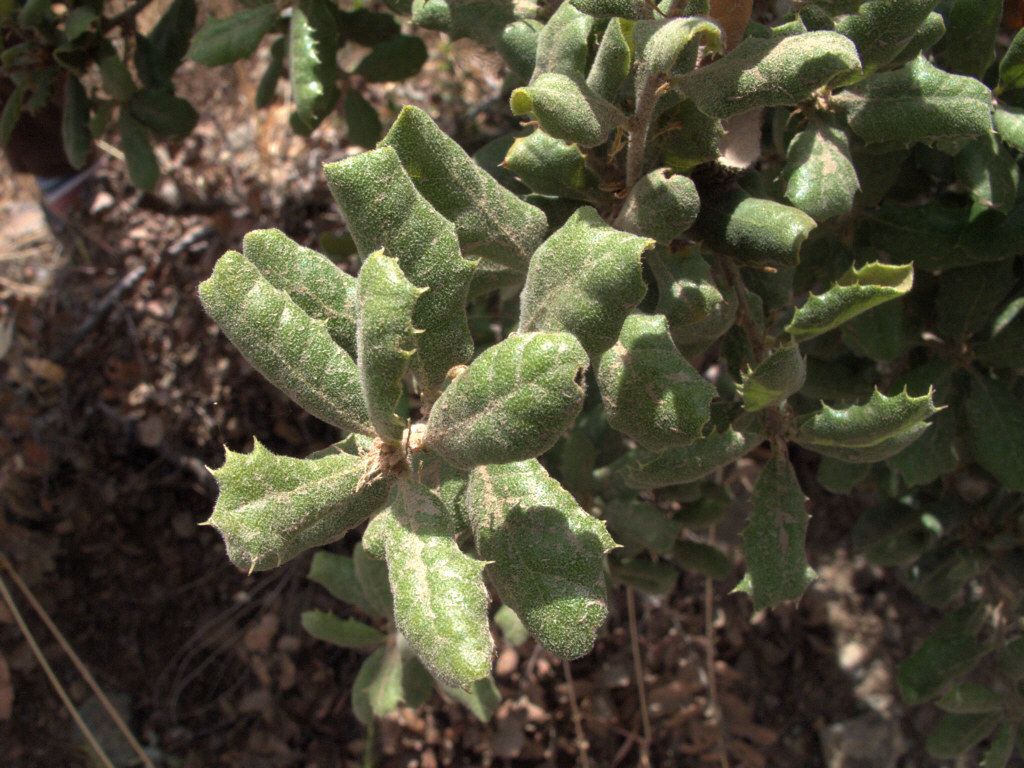
Leathery texture of leaves

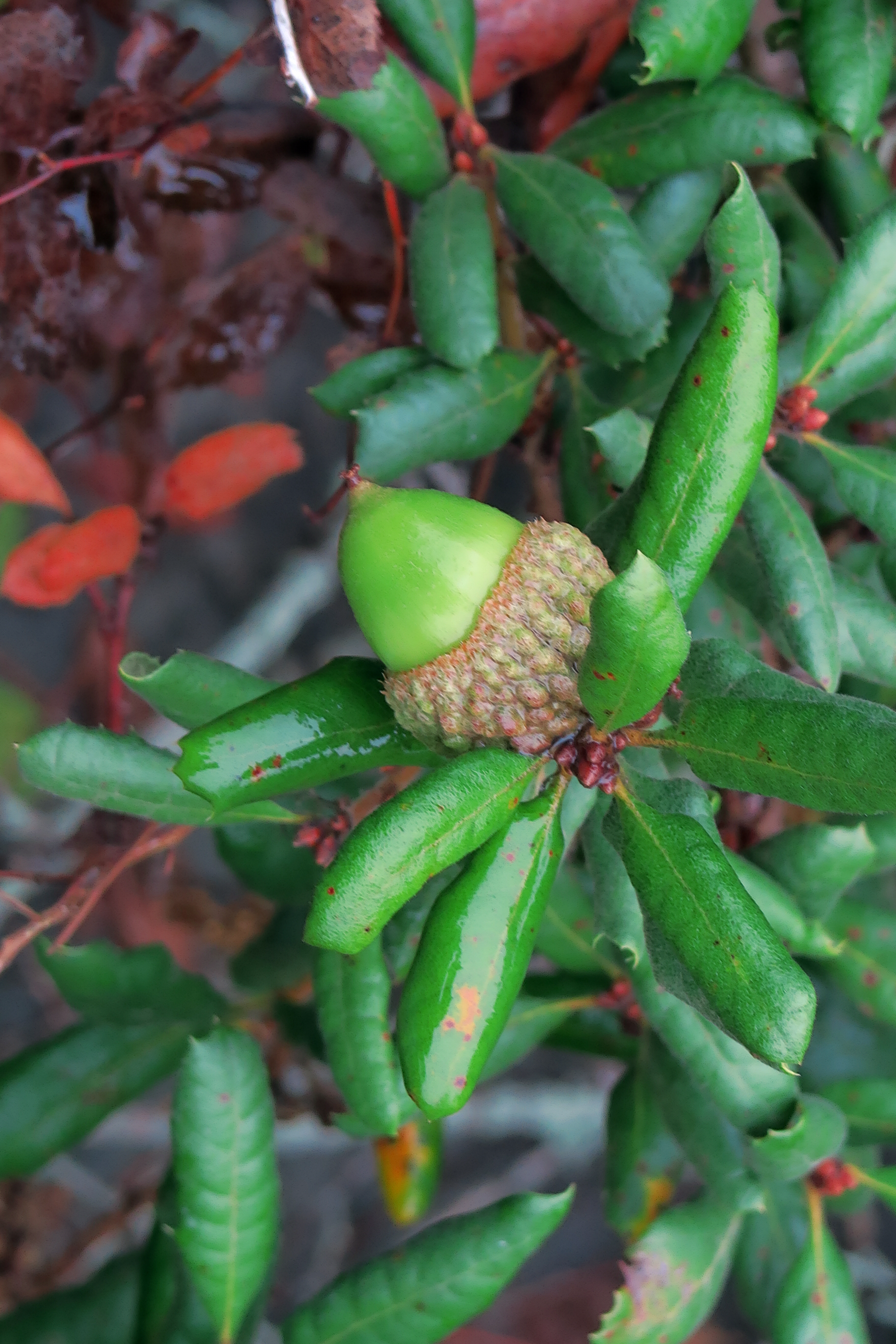
Juvenile acorn

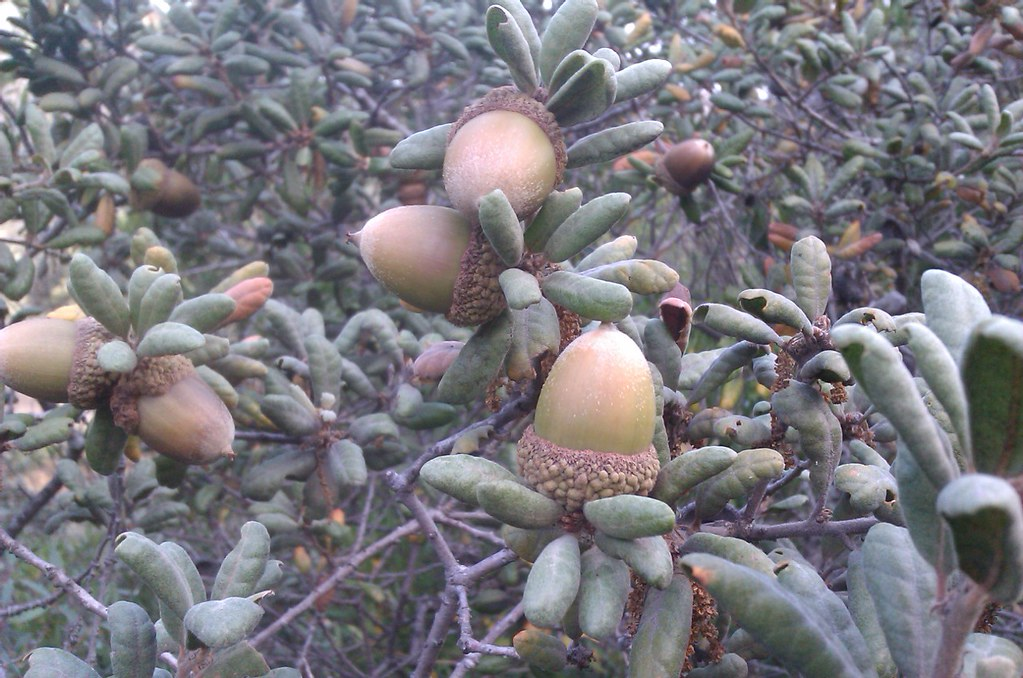
Mature acorns

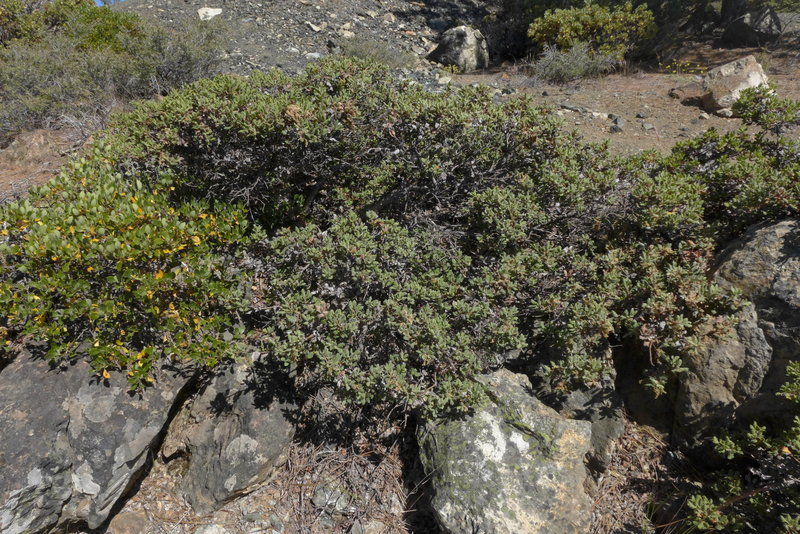
Shown with Garrya buxifolia

=== Var. gabrielensis ===
The gabrielensis variant, found in the San Gabriel Mountains, has leaves that are not as densely crowded and still commonly have regular teeth along the edges. The upper surfaces are colored a darker green and are glossy, glabrous (without hair) and usually moderately cupped or sub-planar. The lower surface of the leaves have persistently wooly surfaces with hairs 2–4 mm in length.

== Distribution, habitat and ecology ==
The range of Quercus durata stretches from Shasta County in Northern California to the bottom of the South Coast Range in Santa Barbara County. The most common variant is found in foothill woodlands and chaparral ecosystems at elevations between 30 and 1,570 m (100 to 5,150 ft). It is especially abundant in Sargent cypress (Hesperocyparis sargentii) woodlands which can be found in portions of Mendocino, Sonoma, San Mateo, Santa Clara, Monterey, San Benito, San Luis Obispo and Santa Barbara counties as well as the San Francisco Bay region. In more sheltered, inland areas like MacNab cypress (Hesperocyparis macnabiana) woodlands this shrub can extend into riparian zones where summer fogs persist.

Q. durata is well suited for ultramafic soils which are reddish and typically nutrient poor, having abundant nickel, magnesium, and chromium content while lacking calcium. Ultramafic chaparral communities are found below 500 m (1,500 ft) from Santa Barbara County north through the North Coast Ranges and also within the foothills of the Sierra Nevada and portions of the California Central Valley. Here, Q. durata can be found with shrubs including chamise (Adenostoma fasciculatum), coffeeberry (Frangula californica), buckthorn (Rhamnus crocea) and toyon (Heteromeles arbutifolia). Scattered occurrences of canyon live oak and coast live oak are also found here. In cases outside of serpentine environments, leather oaks typically occur as isolated individuals within a backdrop of plant associations dominated by California scrub oak (Q. berberidifolia) and interior live oak (Q. wislizeni). The climate in Q. durata habitat is characterized by 41 to 170 cm (16 to 67 in) of annual precipitation during a wet season of 3 to 8 months, temperatures range from a December low of 30 °F to a July high of 96 °F. It can sustain life in soil pH between 5.5 and 8.3. It is found nearly exclusively on serpentine soil it is a strong indicator species for this soil type.

Based on controlled studies done at Jasper Ridge Biological Preserve the harsh environment of Q. durata limits species re-establishment after forest clearing or in colonization of grassland at chaparral-prairie boundaries. Low summer precipitation, high solar insolation, and herbivory are the basis for this difficulty rather than germination rates.

=== Var. gabrielensis ===
Occurs at elevation 370–2,290 m (1,215–7,515 ft) as a limited distribution taxon in the San Gabriel Mountains within the San Bernardino and Los Angeles counties. The dry, exposed slopes of the San Gabriels stretching from La Cañada to Pomona are covered in a chaparral with non-serpentine soils suitable for Quercus durata var. gabrielensis. The precipitation, temperature, and soil pH ranges for the gabrielensis variant are much narrower than the common variant sitting at approximately 24-47 in of water annually, 44-51 °F, and 6.4 to 6.9 pH respectively. The December low in this region is 36 °F while the July high can reach 90 °F.

=== Biotic interactions ===
When located close to species of pine, Q. durata can be infected by certain species of heteroecious rust fungi (cronartium).

Leather oak is a host for the parasitic gall wasp Cynips washingtonensis, which deposits its larvae onto the plant and construct small 1–3 mm spherical galls on Q. durata as well as valley oak (Q. lobata) and coastal sage scrub oak (Q. dumosa). These galls appear in early spring and can be quite numerously attached to twigs and leaves; the gall is typically engulfed in a mass of velvety hairs.

Crystalline gall wasp larvae (Andricus crystallinus) can form irregularly shaped, pallidal galls that agglomerate into masses, with individual galls being between 8–9 mm in length.

It is also a host plant for the sleepy duskywing (Erynnis brizo) butterfly, which sometimes feeds on nectar, and the Pacific tent caterpillar moth (Malacosoma constricta).

Birds and small mammals also consume leather oak acorns.

== Health concerns ==
The acorn shell is mildly toxic, and the acorns themselves contain tannins which may need to be leached before consumption.

== Uses ==
In a study done by Narvaez et al. in 2000 with a group of goats and sheep at the Hopland Research and Extension Center, it was found that for animals employed in vegetation management programs across grass woodlands and chaparral ecosystems nutritional quality and intake levels of Q. durata and Adenostoma fasciculatum foliage were low and demonstrated a need for diet supplementation in livestock performing as part of vegetation control programs.

Native Americans peoples used leather oak as a source of food and medicine. After leaching tannins from the acorns, they would mash it into a nutritional mush that in tandem with other oak products was a staple in their diets. One prevalent leaching method was to place raw acorns in a cloth pouch and leave it in a stream for several weeks to break down. In modern times the mulch from the leather oak is applied to gardens for its efficacy in repelling slugs and grubs. After pupation the oak's gall extracts can be used in tannins and dyes.

== Bibliography ==
- C. Michael Hogan, California Arts and Sciences Institute, https://casicalifornia.org (2014, updated 2023). Leather Oak. Encyclopedia of Earth. National Council for Science and Environment, Washington DC. Retrieved from http://editors.eol.org/eoearth/wiki/Leather_Oak
- Los Padres Forestwatch (2023) Oaks of the Los Padres National Forest. https://lpfw.org/our-region/wildlife/oaks/
