= List of Cynipidae genera =

This is a list of 84 genera in the family Cynipidae (gall wasps).

== Cynipidae genera ==
- Acraspis Mayr, 1881^{i c g b}
- Amphibolips Reinhard, 1865^{i c g b}
- Andricus Hartig, 1840^{i c g b}
- Antistrophus Walsh, 1869^{i g b}
- Aphelonyx Mayr, 1881^{i c g}
- Atrusca Kinsey, 1930^{i c g b}
- Aulacidea Ashmead, 1897^{i c g b}
- Aulax Hartig, 1843^{g}
- Aylax Hartig, 1840^{i c g}
- Barbotinia Nieves-Aldrey, 1994^{i c g}
- Barucynips Medianero & Nieves-Aldrey, 2013^{g}
- Bassettia Ashmead, 1887^{g}
- Belonocnema Mayr, 1881^{i c g b}
- Biorhiza Westwood, 1840^{i c g}
- Buffingtonella Lobato-Vila & Pujade-Villar, 2019
- Burnettweldia Pujade-Villar, Melika & Nicholls, 2021^{b}
- Callirhytis Förster, 1869^{i c g b}
- Cecconia Kieffer, 1902^{i g}
- Ceroptres Hartig, 1840^{i c g b}
- Cerroneuroterus Melika & Pujade-Villar, 2010^{g}
- Chilaspis Mayr, 1881^{i c g}
- Coffeikokkos Pujade-Villar & Melika, 2012^{g}
- Cyclocynips Melika, Tang & Sinclair, 2013^{g}
- Cycloneuroterus Melika & Tang, 2011^{g}
- Cynips Linnaeus, 1758^{i c g b}
- Diastrophus Hartig, 1840^{i c g b}
- Disholandricus Melika, Pujade-Villar & Nicholls, 2021^{b}
- Disholcaspis Dalla Torre & Kieffer, 1910^{i c g b}
- Dros Kinsey, 1937
- Druon Kinsey, 1937
- Dryocosmus Giraud, 1859^{i c g b}
- Eschatocerus Mayr, 1881^{i c g}
- Euceroptres Ashmead, 1896^{g}
- Eumayria Ashmead, 1887^{i c g}
- Eumayriella Melika & Abrahamson, 1997^{g}
- Fontaliella Pujade-Villar, 2013^{g}
- Hedickiana Nieves-Aldrey, 1994^{i c g}
- Heteroecus Kinsey, 1922^{i c g b}
- Hodiernocynips Kovalev, 1994^{g}
- Hypodiranchis Ashmead, 1901^{g}
- Iraella Nieves-Aldrey, 1994^{i c g}
- Isocolus Förster, 1869^{i c g}
- Kinseyella Pujade-Villar & Melika, 2010^{g}
- Latuspina Monzen, 1954^{g}
- Leptolamina Yoshimoto, 1962^{g}
- Liposthenes Förster, 1869^{i c g b}
- Lithonecrus Nieves-Aldrey & Butterill, 2014^{g}
- Loxaulus Mayr, 1881^{i c g}
- Neaylax Nieves-Aldrey, 1994^{i c g}
- Nebulovena Pujade-Villar & Paretas-Martínez, 2012^{g}
- Neuroterus Hartig, 1840^{i c g b} (the jumping gall wasp)
- Nichollsiella Melika, Pujade-Villar & Stone 2021^{b}
- Odontocynips Kieffer, 1910^{i c g}
- Palaeogronotoma Peñalver, Fontal-Cazalla & Pujade-Villar, 2013^{g}
- Panteliella Kieffer, 1901^{i g}
- Parapanteliella Diakonchuk, 1981^{g}
- Paraschiza Weld, 1944^{g}
- Paribalia Weld, 1922^{g}
- Periclistus Förster, 1869^{i c g b}
- Phanacis Förster, 1860^{i c g}
- Philonix Fitch, 1859^{i c g b}
- Phylloteras Ashmead, 1897^{g b}
- Plagiotrochus Mayr, 1881^{i c g}
- Pseudoneuroterus Kinsey, 1923^{i c g}
- Qwaqwaia Liljeblad, Nieves-Aldrey & Melika, 2011^{g}
- Rhodus Quinlan, 1968^{i g}
- Rhoophilus Mayr, 1881^{i c g}
- Saphonecrus Dalla Torre & Kieffer, 1910^{g b}
- Synergus Hartig, 1840^{i c g b}
- Synophromorpha Ashmead, 1903^{i c g}
- Synophrus Hartig, 1843^{i c g}
- Timaspis Mayr, 1881^{i c g}
- Trichagalma Mayr, 1907^{i c g}
- Trichoteras Ashmead, 1897^{g}
- Trigonaspis Hartig, 1840^{i c g b}
- Trisolenia Ashmead, 1887^{g}
- Ufo Melika & Pujade-Villar, 2005^{g}
- Vetustia Belizin, 1959^{g}
- Xanthoteras ^{b}
- Xestophanes Förster, 1869^{i c g}
- Xystoteras Ashmead, 1897^{g}
- Zapatella Pujade-Villar & Melika, 2012^{g b}
- Zopheroteras Ashmead, 1897^{g b}

Data sources: i = ITIS, c = Catalogue of Life, g = GBIF, b = Bugguide.net
