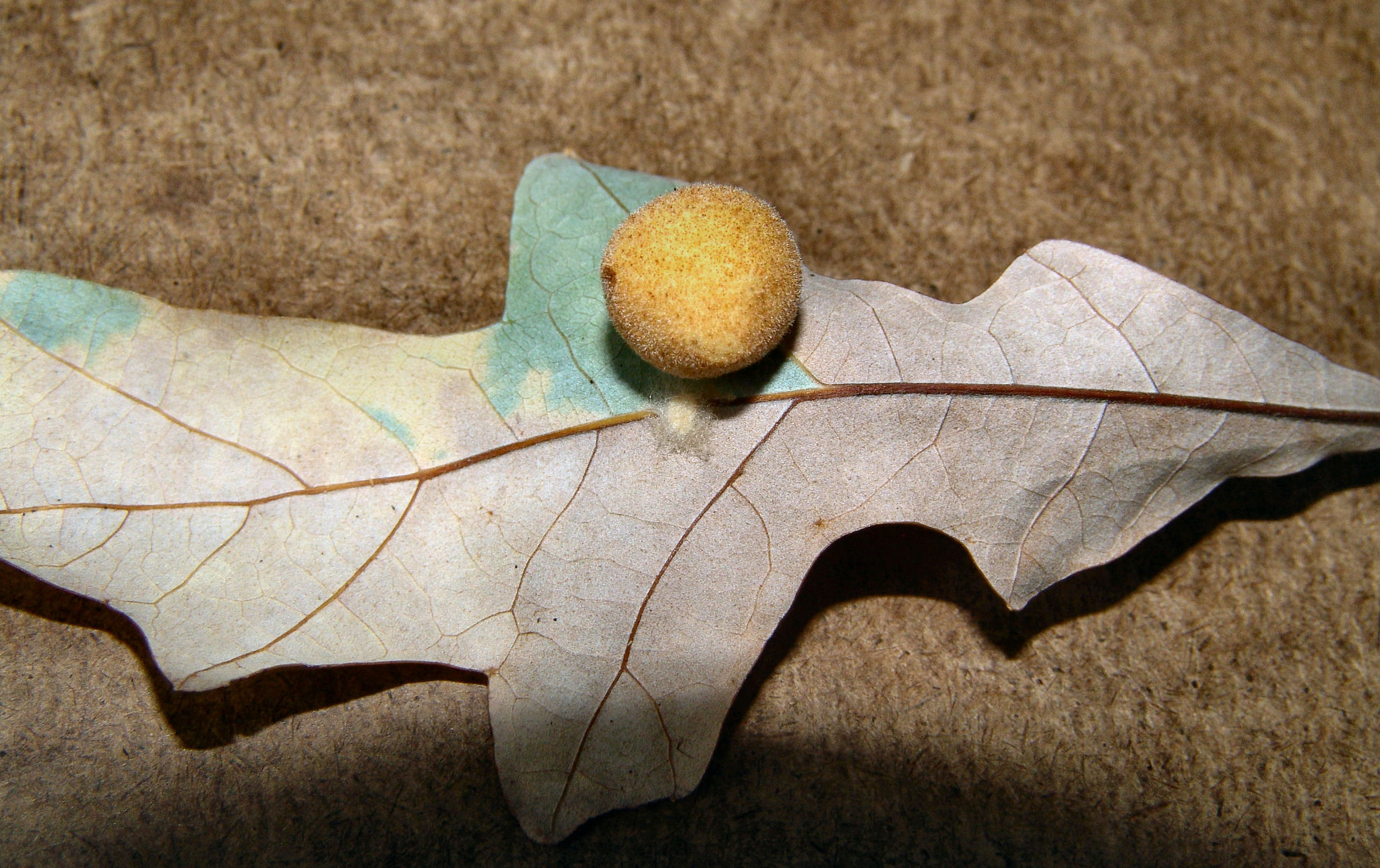
- Gall caused by Philonix gigas larva

Scientific classification
- Kingdom: Animalia
- Phylum: Arthropoda
- Clade: Pancrustacea
- Class: Insecta
- Order: Hymenoptera
- Family: Cynipidae
- Genus: Philonix; Fitch, 1859

= Philonix =

Genus of wasps

Philonix is a genus of oak gall wasps in the family Cynipidae. Species in this genus are only known from Canada, the United States, and Mexico. The larvae of Philonix wasps induce galls on white oaks that are typically spherical, soft and fleshy. Galls are usually formed on the underside of leaves. Adult wasps are similar in appearance to species in the genus Acraspis. Many gall wasps have alternate sexual and asexual generations, but this has not been documented in Philonix.

The genus was first named and described by Asa Fitch in 1859.

The following species are recognised in the genus Philonix:

- P. fulvicollis Fitch, 1859
- P. gigas Weld, 1922
- P. insulensis (Kinsey, 1936)
- P. lanaeglobuli (Ashmead, 1887)
- P. latigenae (Kinsey, 1936)
