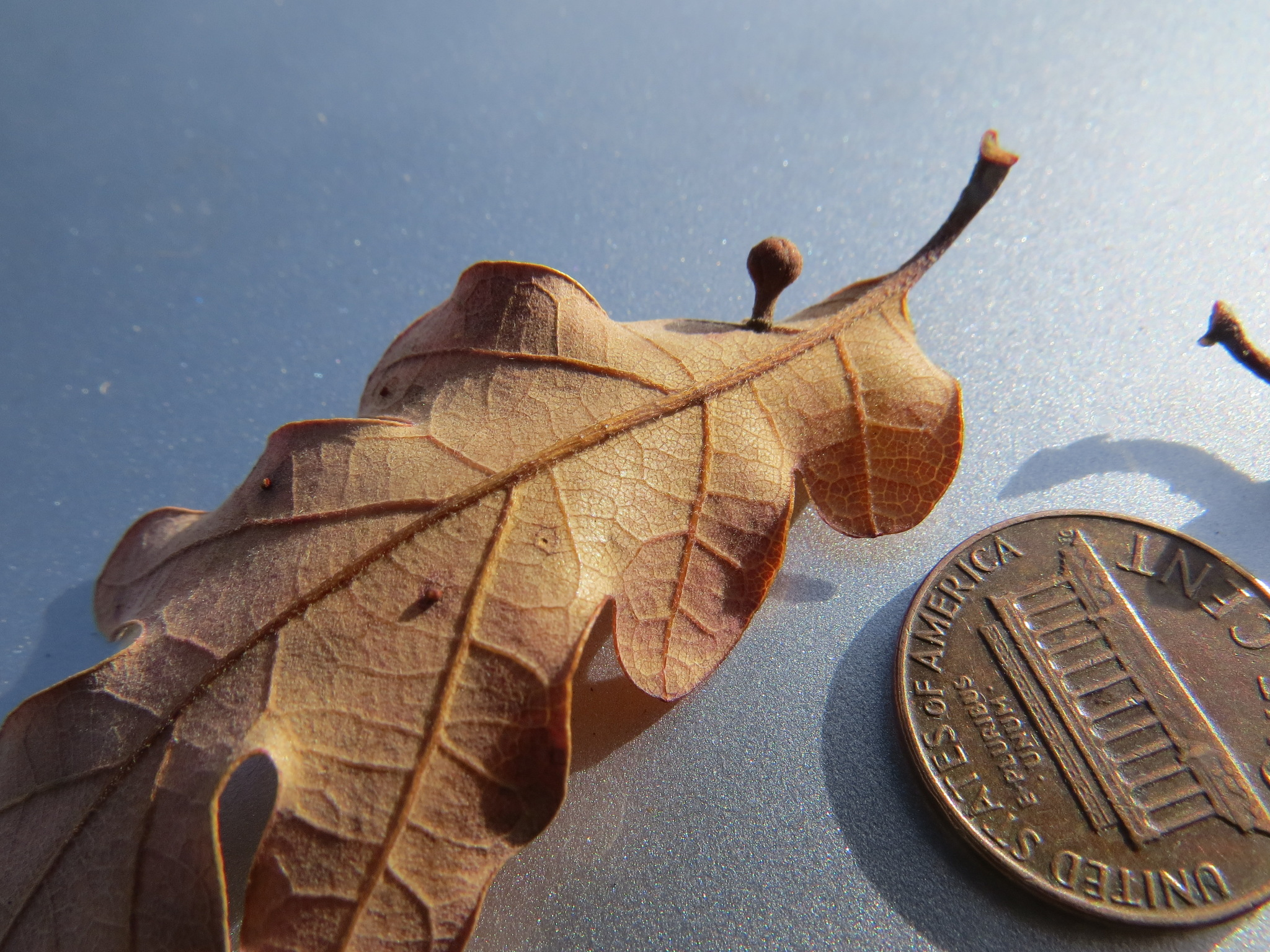
- Gall produced by Xanthoteras teres, collected Jackson County, Oregon, 2021

Scientific classification
- Kingdom: Animalia
- Phylum: Arthropoda
- Class: Insecta
- Order: Hymenoptera
- Family: Cynipidae
- Subfamily: Cynipinae
- Tribe: Cynipini
- Genus: Xanthoteras
- Species: X. teres

Binomial name
- Xanthoteras teres Weld, 1926

= Xanthoteras teres =

North American gall-inducing wasp

Xanthoteras teres (formerly Trigonapsis teres), the ball-tipped gall wasp, is a species of cynipid wasp that produces galls on oak trees in Oregon and California in North America. The wasp oviposits on the leaves of Oregon oaks and leather oaks, resulting in a somewhat Suessian gall that has an upright stalk topped by a fuzzy ball. The species was first described by Lewis Hart Weld in 1926.
