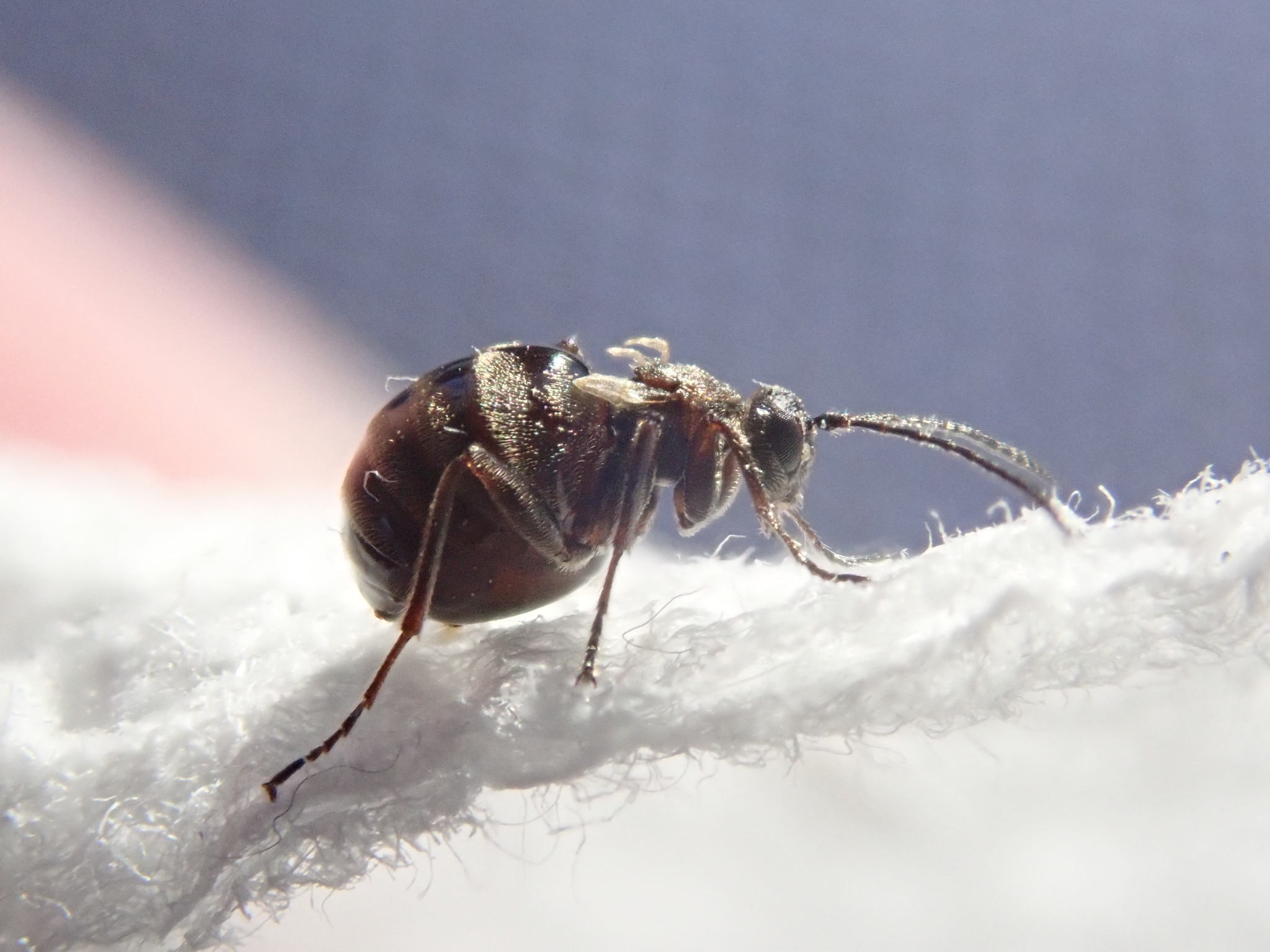
- adult female, Aug 31 2020

Scientific classification
- Kingdom: Animalia
- Phylum: Arthropoda
- Clade: Pancrustacea
- Class: Insecta
- Order: Hymenoptera
- Family: Cynipidae
- Genus: Acraspis
- Species: A. quercushirta

Binomial name
- Acraspis quercushirta Bassett, 1864

Synonyms
- Acraspis macrescens Kinsey, 1936; Acraspis macrocarpae Bassett, 1890; Acraspis undulata Gillette, 1893; Cynips quercushirta Bassett, 1864

= Acraspis quercushirta =

Species of wasp

Acraspis quercushirta, the jewel oak gall wasp, is a species of gall wasp in the family Cynipidae, tribe Cynipini (oak gall wasps), found in North America.

Hosts are white oaks, including bur oak, Gambel oak, Chapman oak, swamp chestnut oak, and chestnut oak.

== Ecology and Life History ==
Like most oak gall wasps, this species has two generations per year - one asexual (or agamic) and one sexual, with each generation producing distinct galls. The wingless females of the asexual generation emerge from their galls in fall and climb up an oak tree to oviposit in bud scales thereby inducing the gall development. These inconspicuous galls and their larval inhabitants overwinter and continue their development in spring before adults emerge in late May and early June. These sexual generation adults mate and the females oviposit on veins on the underside of host leaves. The induced gall is detachable, oval in shape, and the color can range from white to yellowish to tan or brown. The surface is fissured into facets that end in a short, hard point, reminiscent of jewelry. These galls typically fall with the leaves in autumn with the asexual female adults emerging shortly thereafter.

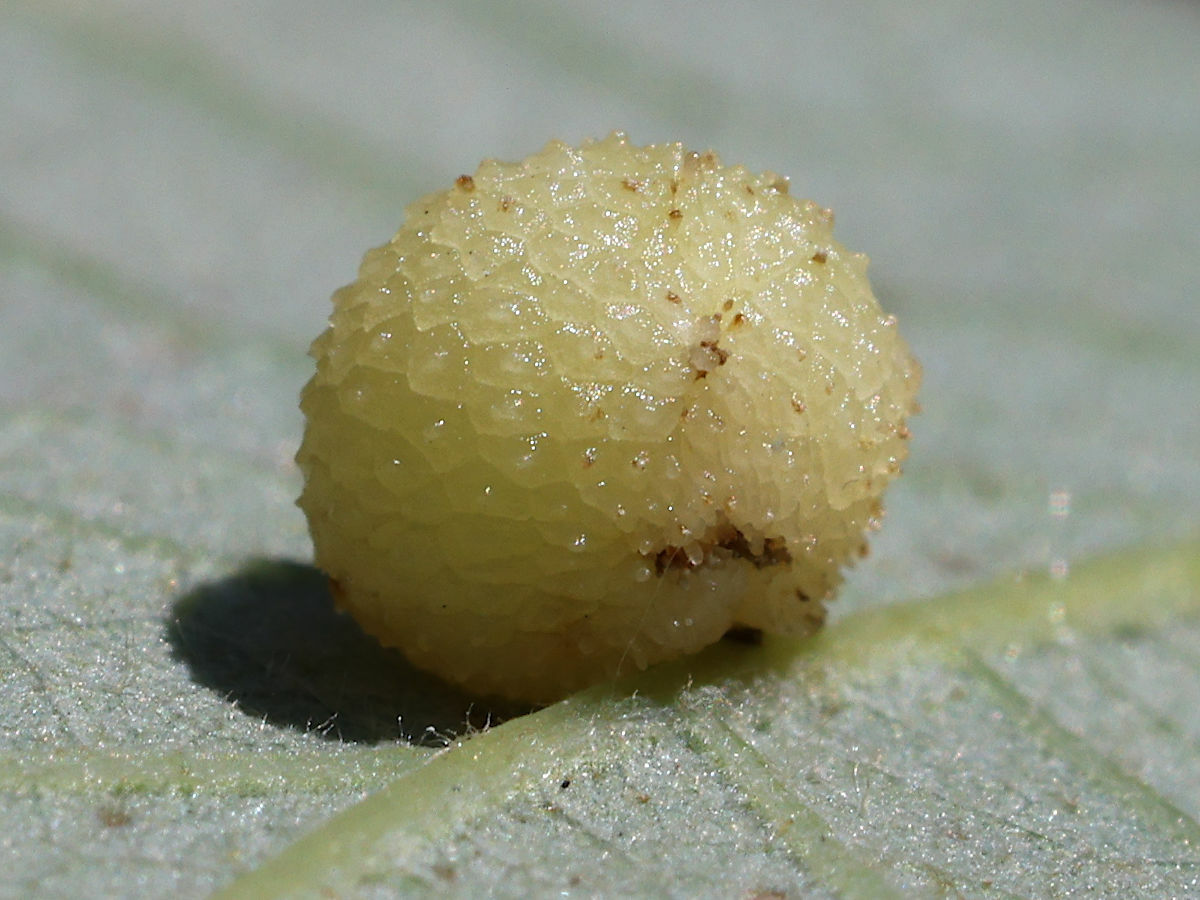
gall, Jun 24 2022

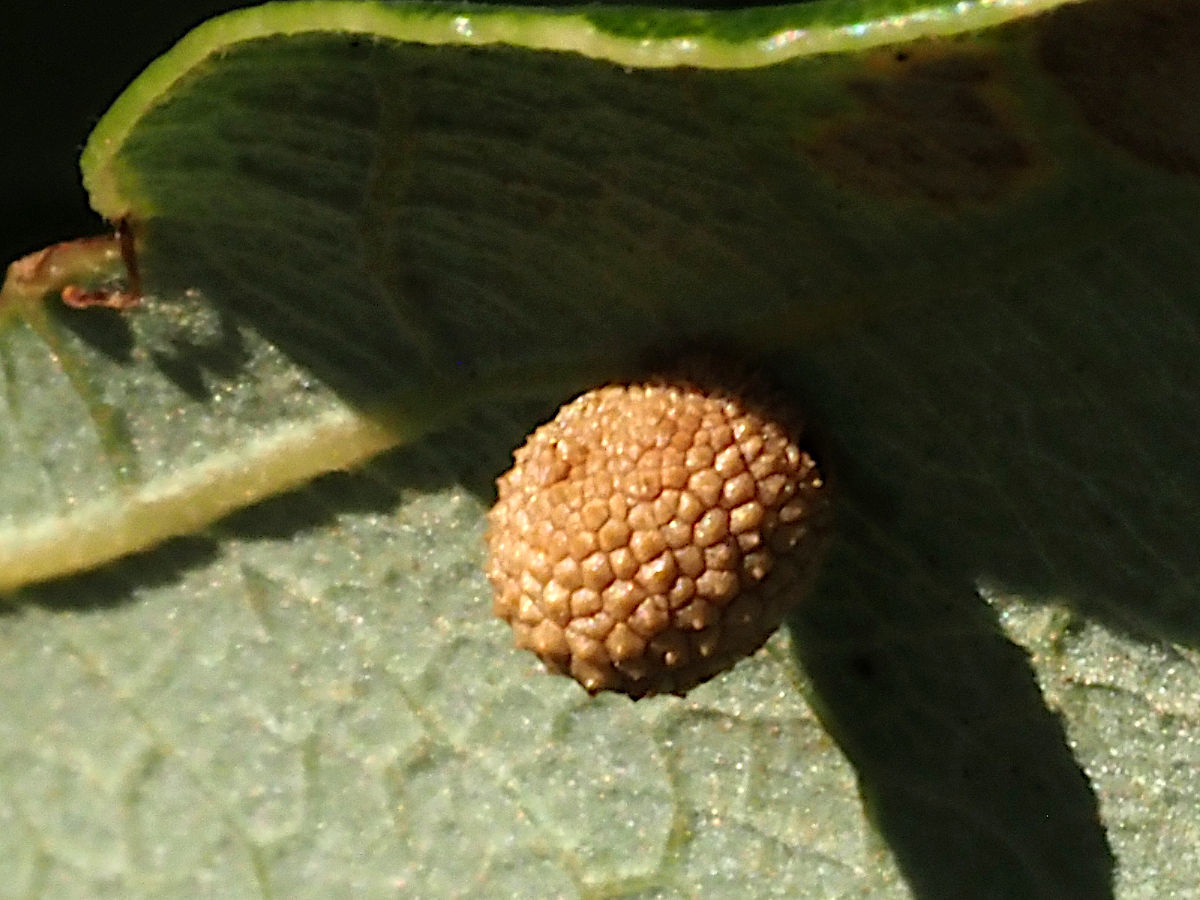
gall, Aug 30 2021
