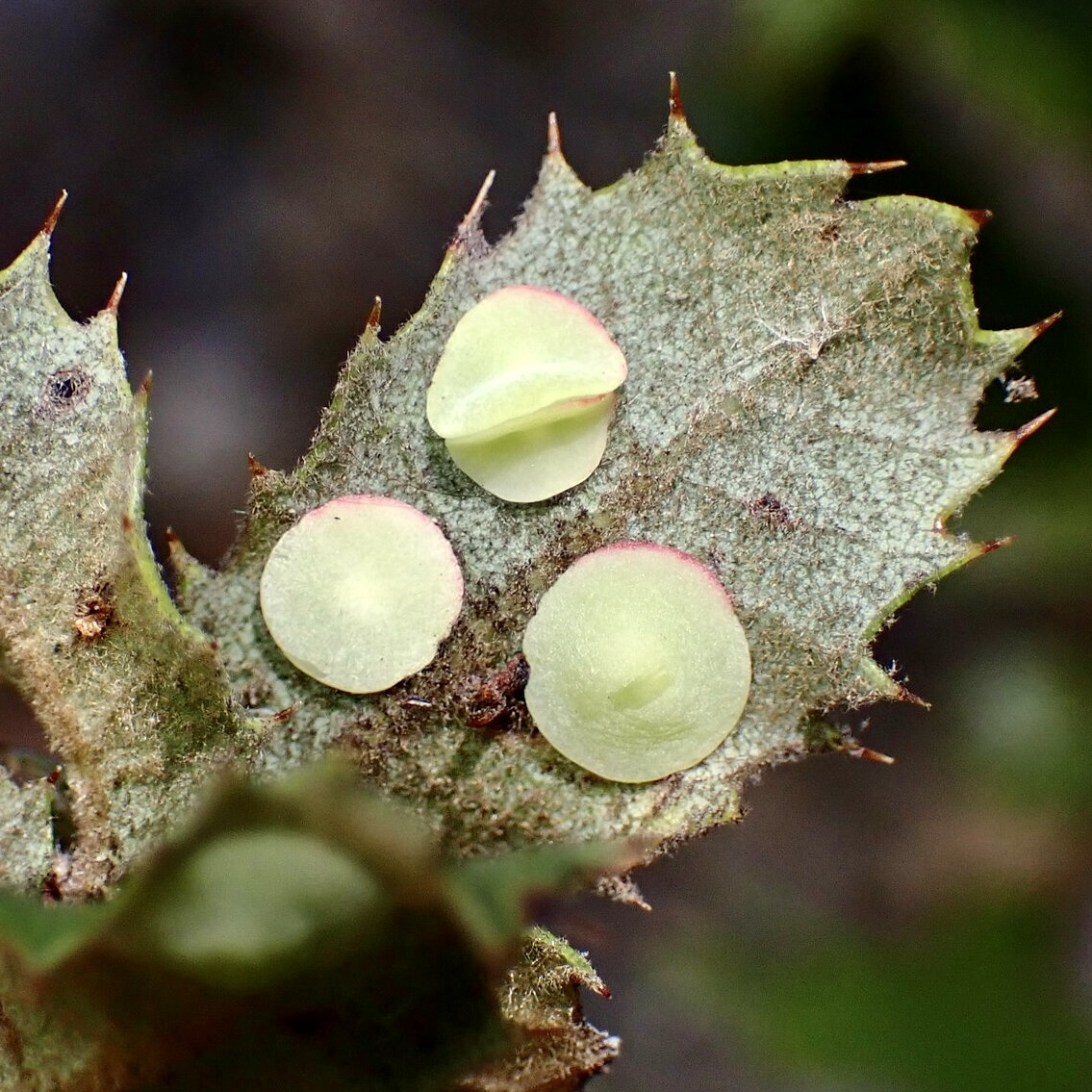
- Galls induced by Paracraspis guadaloupensis

Scientific classification
- Domain: Eukaryota
- Kingdom: Animalia
- Phylum: Arthropoda
- Class: Insecta
- Order: Hymenoptera
- Family: Cynipidae
- Subfamily: Cynipinae
- Tribe: Cynipini
- Genus: Paracraspis; Weld, 1952

Type species
- Callirhytis guadaloupensis Fullaway, 1911

= Paracraspis =

Genus of insects

Paracraspis is a genus of oak gall wasps in the Nearctic. It was established by Lewis Hart Weld in 1952, then re-established in 2021.

== Species ==
The following species are grouped into Paracraspis:

- Paracraspis guadaloupensis (Fullaway, 1911)
- Paracraspis insolens (Weld, 1926)
- Paracraspis patelloides (Weld, 1926)
