= Alveoplectrus =

- Alveoplectrus lilli

Scientific classification
- Kingdom: Animalia
- Phylum: Arthropoda
- Clade: Pancrustacea
- Class: Insecta
- Order: Hymenoptera
- Family: Eulophidae
- Subfamily: Eulophinae
- Genus: Alveoplectrus; Wijesekara & Schauff, 1997

Type species
- Alveoplectrus floridanus Wijesekara & Schauff, 1997

Species
- Alveoplectrus corumbae (Ashmead, 1904); Alveoplectrus floridanus Wijesekara & Schauff, 1997; Alveoplectrus lilli Gates, 2010; Alveoplectrus truncatus Wijesekara & Schauff, 1997

Genus of wasps

Alveoplectrus is a Neotropical genus of hymenopteran insects of the family Eulophidae. Its species are notable for having depressions on their face.

== Etymology ==
The genus gains its name from the Latin root 'alveo,' which translates to 'cavity.' This refers to the aforementioned cavities on its face.

== Distribution ==
Species can be found in United States, Mexico, Brazil, Panama, and Costa Rica.
