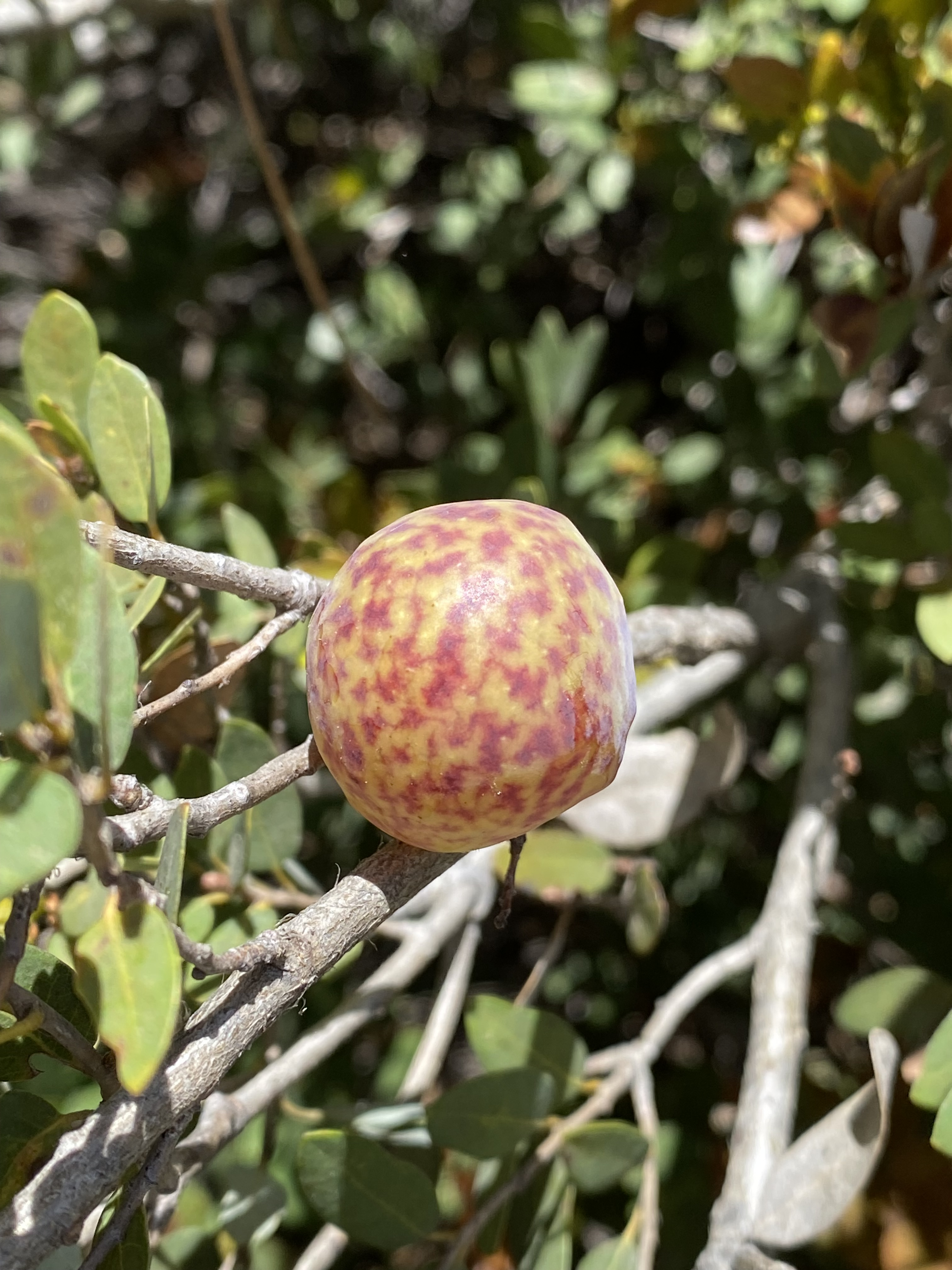
- Plumas County, 2023

Scientific classification
- Kingdom: Animalia
- Phylum: Arthropoda
- Class: Insecta
- Order: Hymenoptera
- Family: Cynipidae
- Subfamily: Cynipinae
- Tribe: Cynipini
- Genus: Trichoteras
- Species: T. vacciniifoliae

Binomial name
- Trichoteras vacciniifoliae (Ashmead, 1896)

= Trichoteras vacciniifoliae =

North American gall-forming wasp

Trichoteras vacciniifoliae, formerly Andricus vacciniifoliae, the golden oak apple wasp, is a species of gall-forming hymenopteran. The wasp creates a stem gall on host plants, namely huckleberry oaks and canyon live oaks. Andricus vacciniifoliae is native to the west coast of North America. Because of their colorful appearance and location on the plant, the galls are often mistaken for fruit. The larval chamber is at the center of the gall, connected to the husk by slender, radiating fibers.

== See also ==
- Trichoteras coquilletti
- Oak apple
