= Lewis Weld =

Lewis Weld may refer to:

- Lewis Hart Weld (1875–1964), American entomologist
- Lewis Ledyard Weld (1833–1865), American lawyer, politician, and Union Army officer
