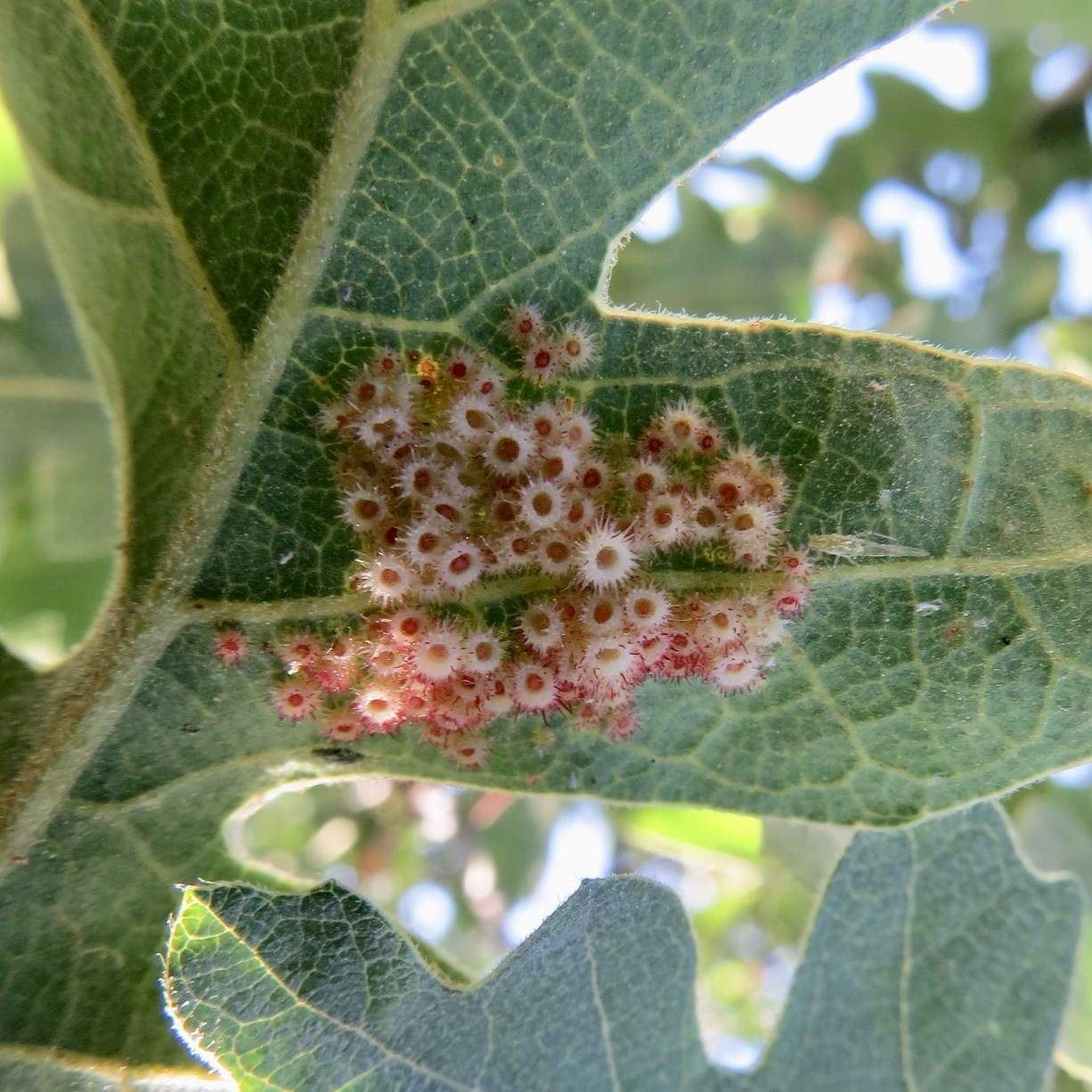
- Siskiyou County, California, 2020

Scientific classification
- Kingdom: Animalia
- Phylum: Arthropoda
- Class: Insecta
- Order: Hymenoptera
- Family: Cynipidae
- Subfamily: Cynipinae
- Tribe: Cynipini
- Genus: Trichoteras
- Species: T. tubifaciens

Binomial name
- Trichoteras tubifaciens (Weld, 1926)

= Trichoteras tubifaciens =

North American gall-inducing wasp

Trichoteras tubifaciens, formerly Andricus tubifaciens, also known as the crystalline tube gall wasp, is an uncommon species of cynipid wasp that produces galls on oak trees in Califoeni and Oregon in North America. This wasp oviposits on the midrib of the underside of the leaves of Oregon oaks. Up to 35 galls have been observed on a single leaf. Cream, yellow, red, and multicolor variants have been documented.
