= Alveoplectrus corumbae =

Scientific classification
- Kingdom: Animalia
- Phylum: Arthropoda
- Clade: Pancrustacea
- Class: Insecta
- Order: Hymenoptera
- Family: Eulophidae
- Genus: Alveoplectrus
- Species: A. corumbae

Binomial name
- Alveoplectrus corumbae (Ashmead, 1904)

Species of wasp

Alveoplectrus corumbae is a species of wasp from the Eulophidae family. The species was originally described as Euplectrus corumbae by Ashmead in 1904.

== Etymology ==
The species is named after Corumbá, Brazil, from where it originates.
