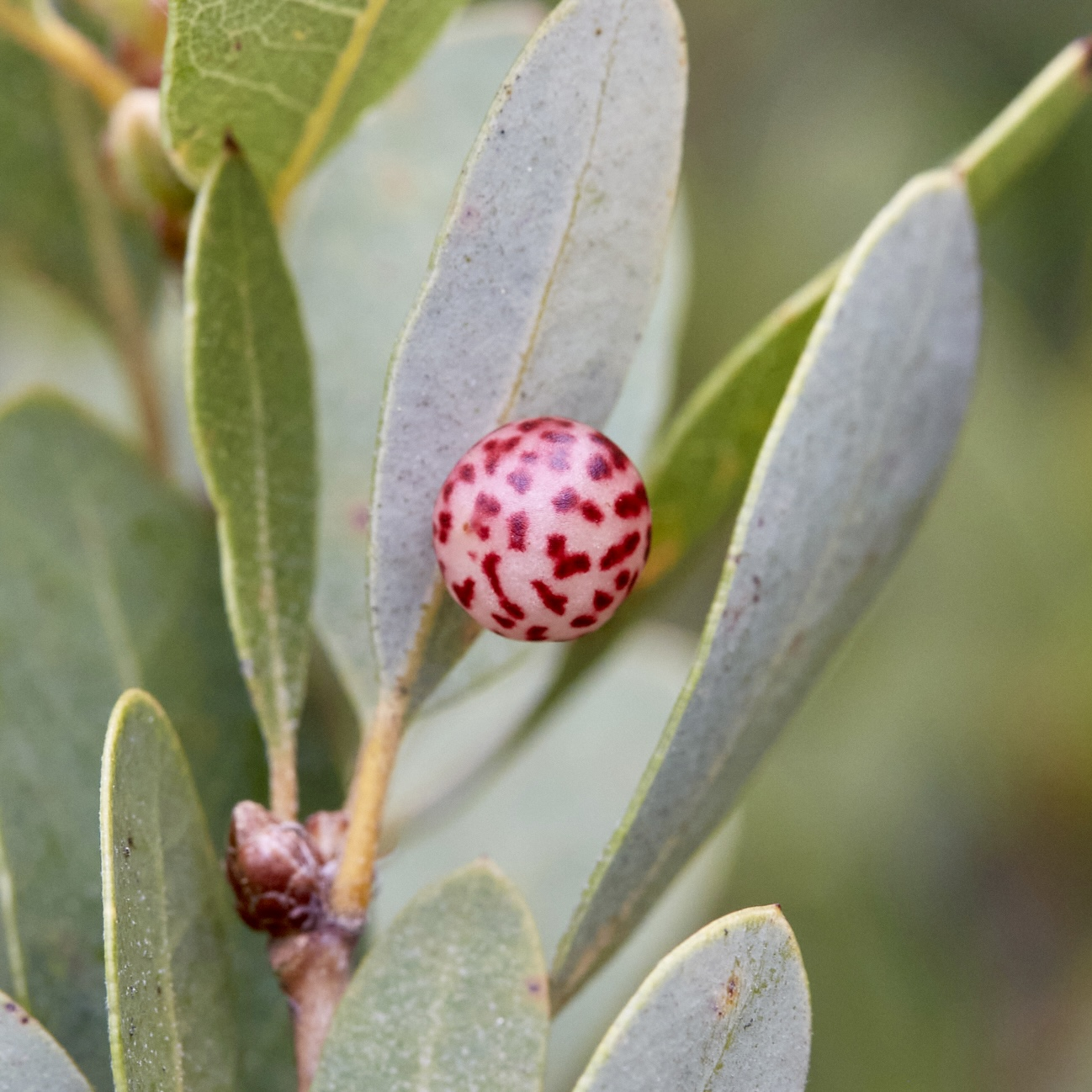
- Trinity County, California, 2021

Scientific classification
- Kingdom: Animalia
- Phylum: Arthropoda
- Class: Insecta
- Order: Hymenoptera
- Family: Cynipidae
- Subfamily: Cynipinae
- Tribe: Cynipini
- Genus: Trichoteras
- Species: T. coquilletti

Binomial name
- Trichoteras coquilletti Ashmead, 1897

= Trichoteras coquilletti =

North American gall-inducing wasp

Trichoteras coquilletti, formerly Andricus coquilletti, also known as the little oak-apple gall wasp, is a fairly common species of cynipid wasp that produces galls on oak trees in North America. This wasp oviposits on the underside of the leaves of huckleberry oaks and canyon live oaks. The larval chamber is at the center of the gall, connected to the husk by slender, radiating fibers.

== See also ==
- Trichoteras vacciniifoliae
- Oak apple
