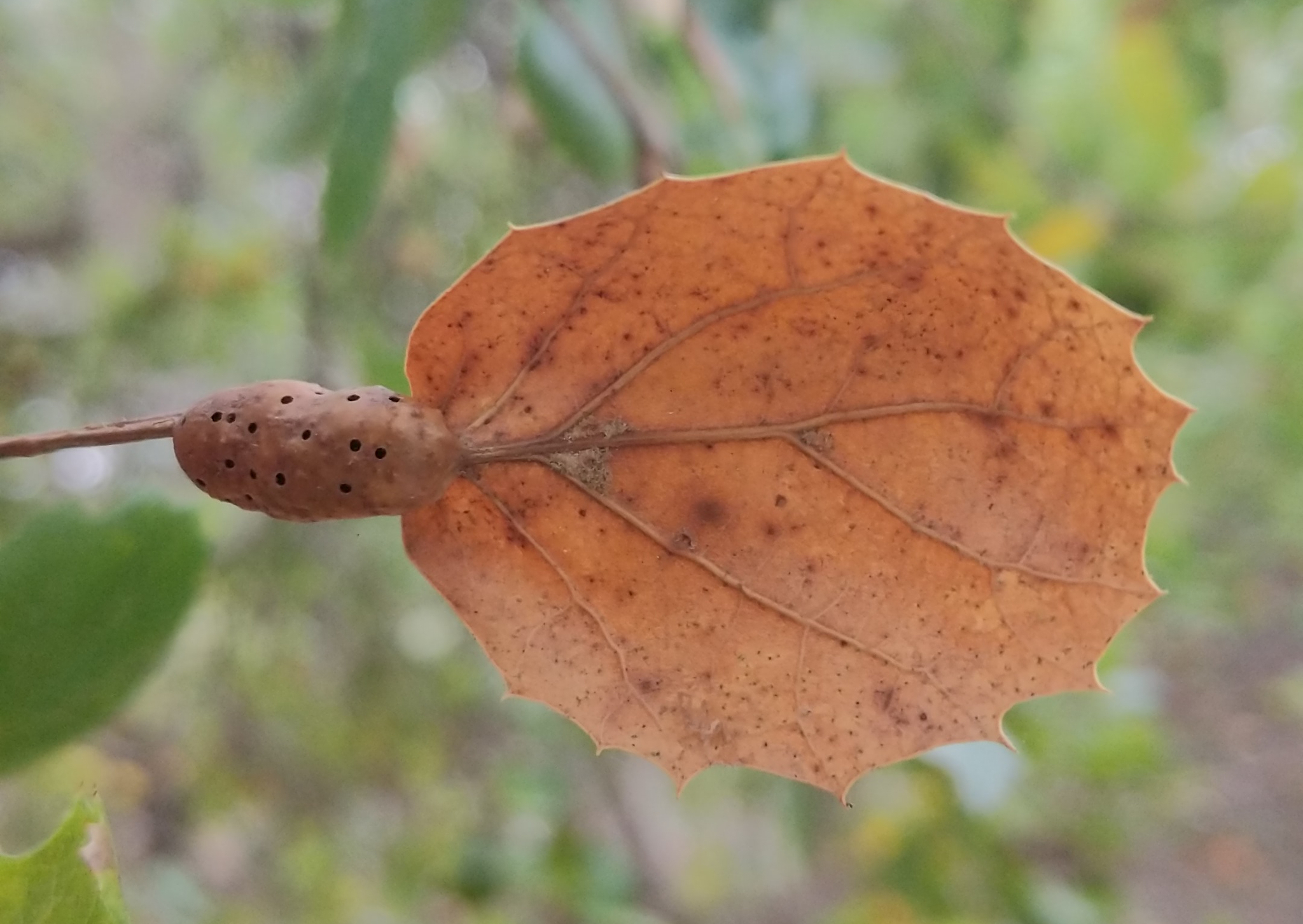
- Morro Bay State Park, 2021

Scientific classification
- Kingdom: Animalia
- Phylum: Arthropoda
- Class: Insecta
- Order: Hymenoptera
- Family: Cynipidae
- Genus: Melikaiella
- Species: M. flora

Binomial name
- Melikaiella flora (Weld, 1922)

Synonyms
- Callirhytis milleri

= Melikaiella flora =

North American gall-inducing wasp

Melikaiella flora, formerly Callirhytis milleri, the live oak petiole gall wasp, is a species of hymenopteran that produces leaf galls on coast live oak, interior live oak, and canyon live oak trees in California in North America. The gall often subsumes the entire petiole and occasionally part of the leaf body. Pregnant females of the second generation oviposit on acorns; these acorns are usually dropped by the tree and become food for squirrels, deer, Steller's jays, etc.
