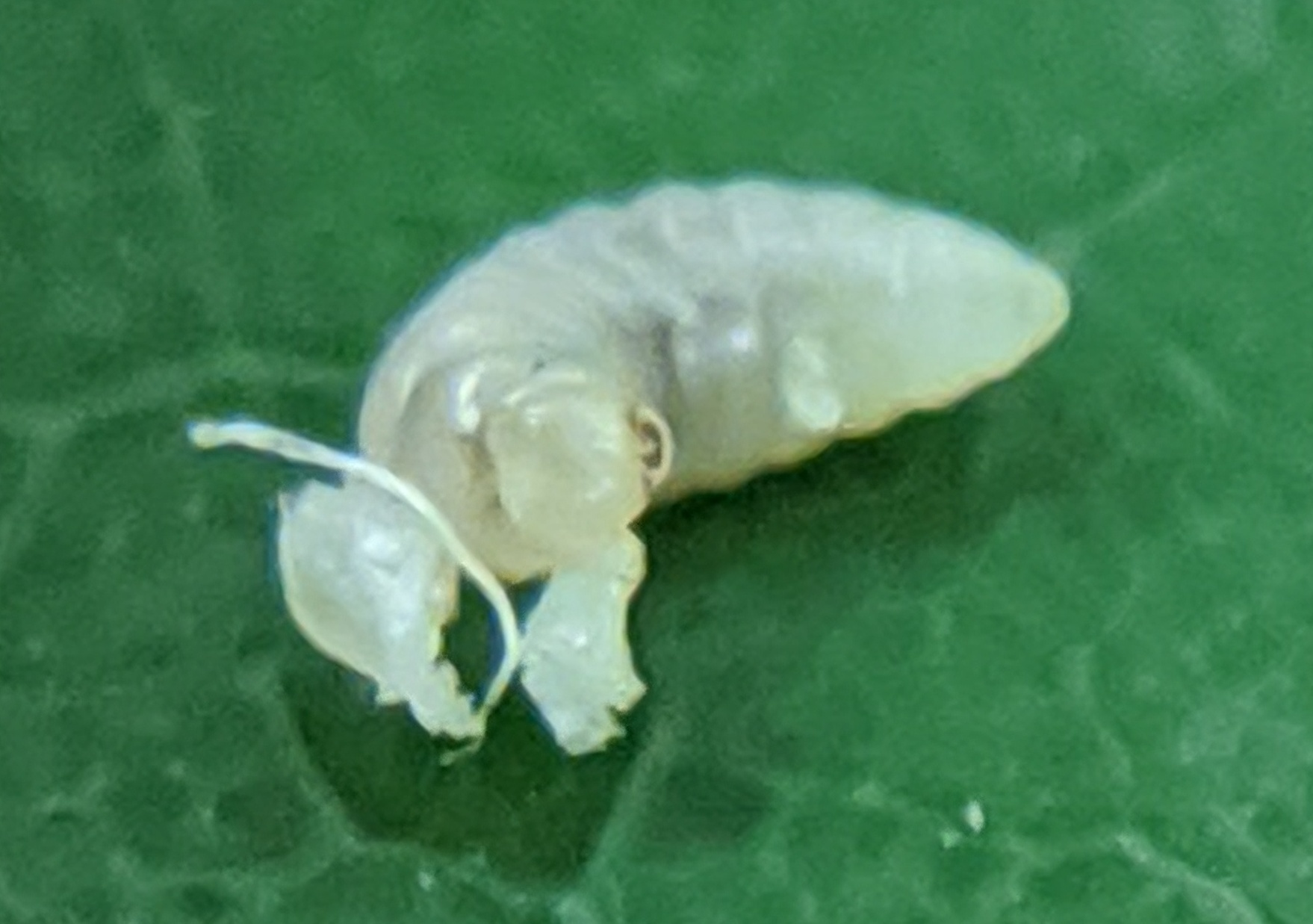

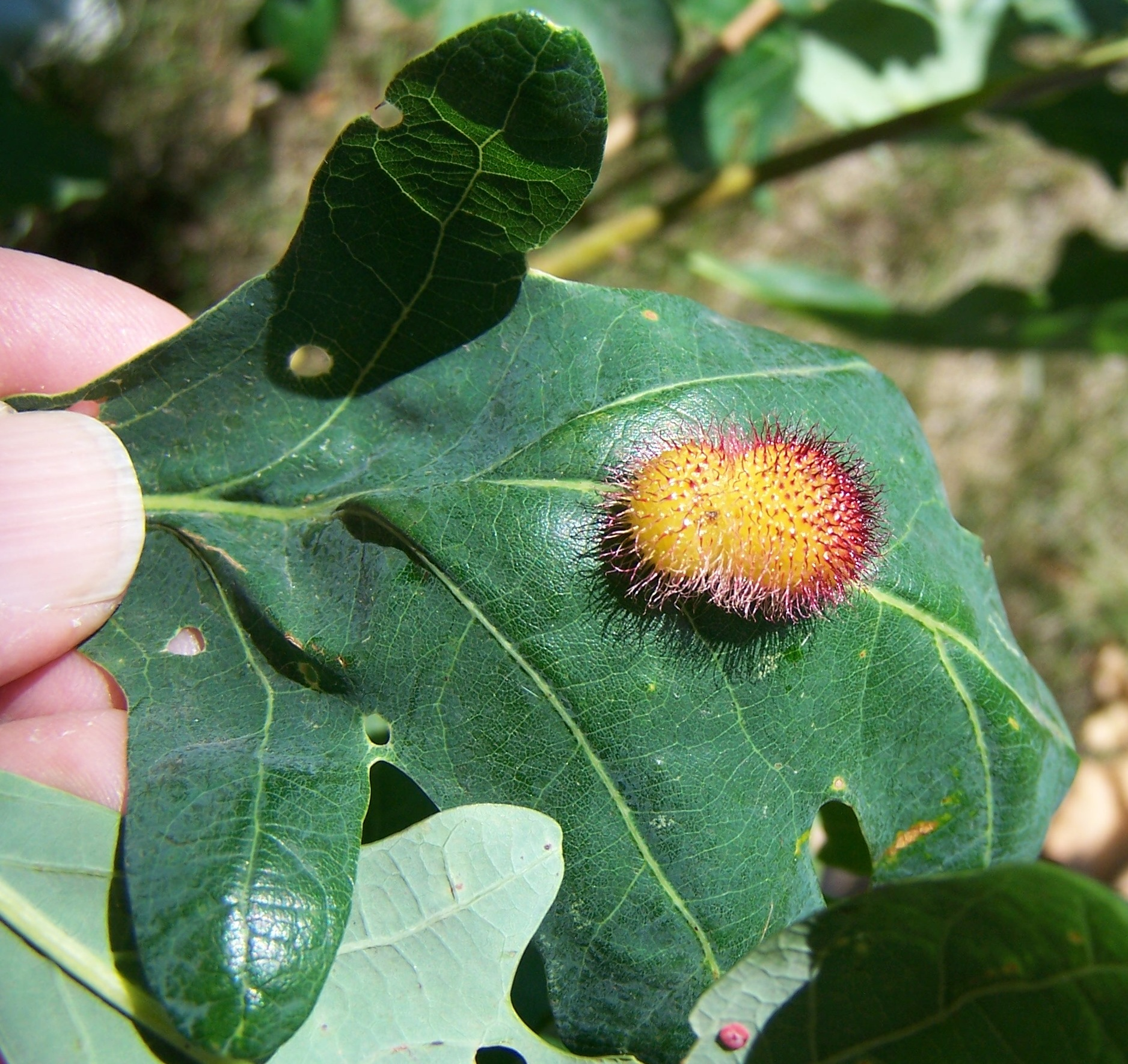
- Larva (top) and hedgehog gall (bottom)

Scientific classification
- Kingdom: Animalia
- Phylum: Arthropoda
- Class: Insecta
- Order: Hymenoptera
- Family: Cynipidae
- Genus: Acraspis
- Species: A. erinacei

Binomial name
- Acraspis erinacei (Beutenmüller, 1909)

= Acraspis erinacei =

Species of wasp

Acraspis erinacei, the hedgehog gall wasp, is a species of gall wasp in the family Cynipidae.
