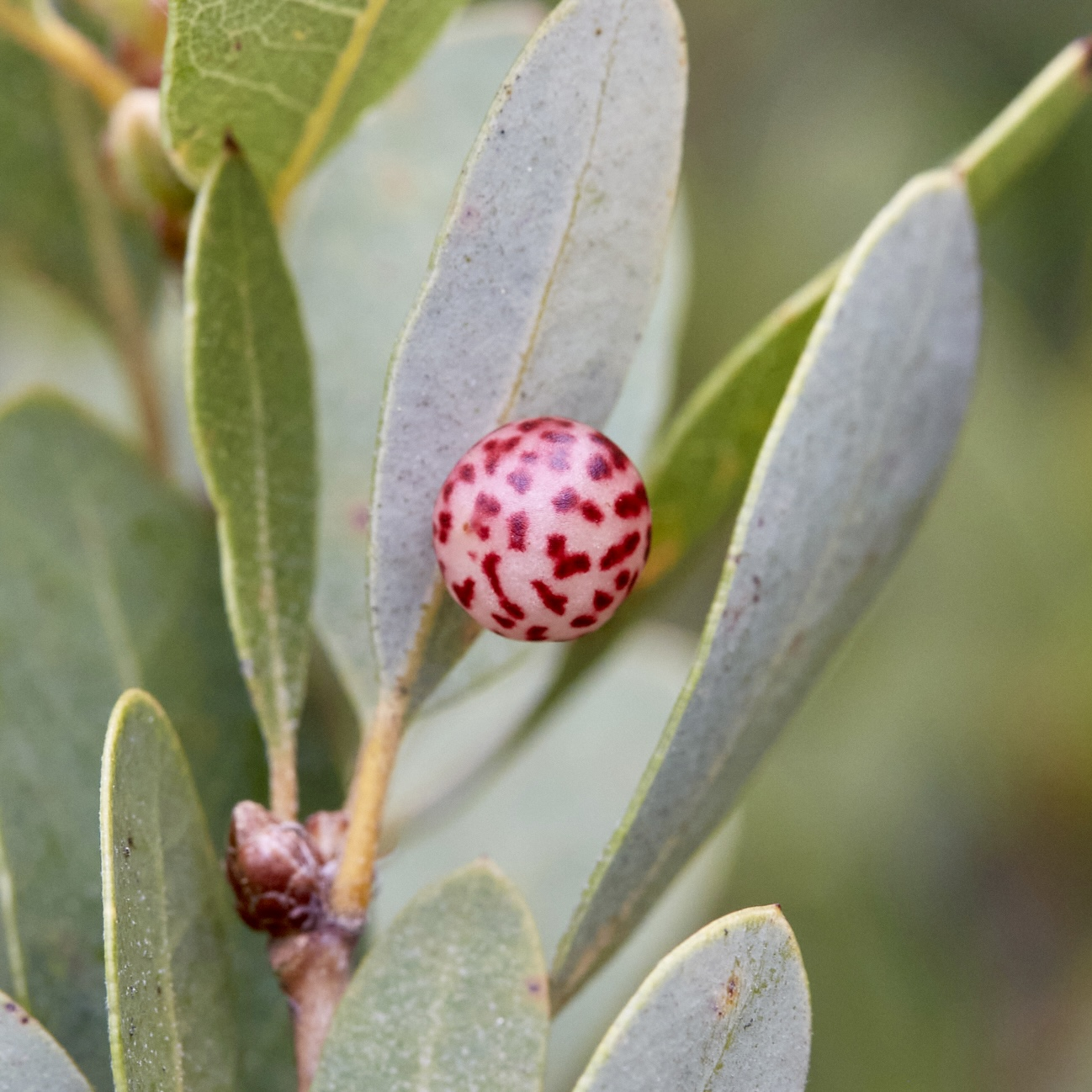
- Oak-apple gall produced by Trichoteras coquilletti

Scientific classification
- Kingdom: Animalia
- Phylum: Arthropoda
- Class: Insecta
- Order: Hymenoptera
- Family: Cynipidae
- Subfamily: Cynipinae
- Tribe: Cynipini
- Genus: Trichoteras; Ashmead, 1897

= Trichoteras =

Genus of wasps

Trichoteras is a genus of gall-inducing Hymenopteran that has several species formerly classed as Andricus. Trichoteras characteristics include antennae with 10 flagellomeres. An entomologist writing in 2018 stated that "is questionable that Heteroecus and Trichoteras should be synonymized with Andricus" in regard to a proposed taxonomic reorganization of 2002. Ronald A. Russo in Plant Galls of the Western United States moves species like the golden oak apple wasp from Andricus to Trichoteras, while acknowledging the previously accepted binomials. William Harris Ashmead first defined this genus in 1897.

List of Trichoteras species:

- Trichoteras burnetti (formerly Andricus burnetti) - woolly gall wasp
- Trichoteras coquilletti (formerly Andricus coquilletti) - little oak-apple gall wasp
- Trichoteras frondeum (formerly Andricus frondeum) - leafy bud gall wasp
- Trichoteras rotundula (formerly Andricus rotundula) - little urn gall wasp
- Trichoteras tubifaciens (formerly Andricus tubifaciens) - crystalline tube gall wasp
- Trichoteras vacciniifoliae (formerly Andricus vacciniifoliae) - golden oak-apple gall wasp

== Sources ==
- Russo, Ronald A. (2021). Plant Galls of the Western United States. Princeton University Press. doi:10.1515/9780691213408. ISBN 978-0-691-21340-8.
