= Acraspis villosa =

Scientific classification
- Kingdom: Animalia
- Phylum: Arthropoda
- Class: Insecta
- Order: Hymenoptera
- Family: Cynipidae
- Genus: Acraspis
- Species: A. villosa

Binomial name
- Acraspis villosa Gillette, 1888

Synonyms
- Acraspis villosus Gillette (1888); Synergus villosus, 1890

Gall-forming wasp from the family Cynipidae

Acraspis villosa is a gall-forming wasp from the family Cynipidae. It can be found in Canada and the US. It forms galls on Quercus macrocarpa.
