= Cyclocynips =

Scientific classification
- Kingdom: Animalia
- Phylum: Arthropoda
- Clade: Pancrustacea
- Class: Insecta
- Order: Hymenoptera
- Family: Cynipidae
- Subfamily: Cynipinae
- Tribe: Cynipini
- Genus: Cyclocynips; Melika, Tang & Sinclair, 2013

Type species
- Cyclocynips uberis Melika & Tang, 2013

Genus of wasps

Cyclocynips is a genus of oak gall wasps in the family Cynipidae. Species in this genus form galls on various Fagaceae in the Eastern Palearctic. The genus is named after its host association with oaks in the section Cyclobalanopsis.

Species are currently only known from their asexual generation, and it is unknown whether members of this genus are heterogonic.

Existing species have been reared from galls on Quercus longinux and Quercus glauca.

== Species ==
Below is a list of valid known species from this genus:

- Cyclocynips tumorvigae Melika & Tang, 2013
- Cyclocynips uberis Melika & Tang, 2013
