= Alveoplectrus truncatus =

Scientific classification
- Kingdom: Animalia
- Phylum: Arthropoda
- Clade: Pancrustacea
- Class: Insecta
- Order: Hymenoptera
- Family: Eulophidae
- Genus: Alveoplectrus
- Species: A. truncatus

Binomial name
- Alveoplectrus truncatus Wijesekara & Schauff, 1997

Species of insect

Alveoplectrus truncatus is a species of insect from the Eulophidae family. It was described by Wijesekara & Schauff in 1997. It can be found in Costa Rica.

== Etymology ==
The species gains its name from the truncated clava of its antennae. This refers to the tip of the antennae, which are cut short.
