= Florida Dispatch =

The Florida Dispatch was an agricultural newspaper published in Florida from 1876 to 1893.

== History ==
The Florida Dispatch was established and published by William Harris Ashmead. D. H. Elliot was editor of The Florida Dispatch.

The newspaper was published in Live Oak, Florida from 1876 to February 11, 1880. The newspaper was published in Jacksonville, Florida from February 18, 1880 onward.

From 1887 to 1889, the newspaper was named the Florida Farmer & Fruit Grower. From 1889 to 1893, the newspaper was named The Florida Dispatch and Farmer and Fruit Grower.

In 1884, Charles W. Da Costa became publisher of the paper. It was associated with the Florida Dispatch Line.

== Legacy ==
Issues of The Florida Dispatch are held at the State University Libraries of Florida, the University of Florida Digital Collections, and other university libraries.
