= Homer Franklin Bassett =

American entomologist

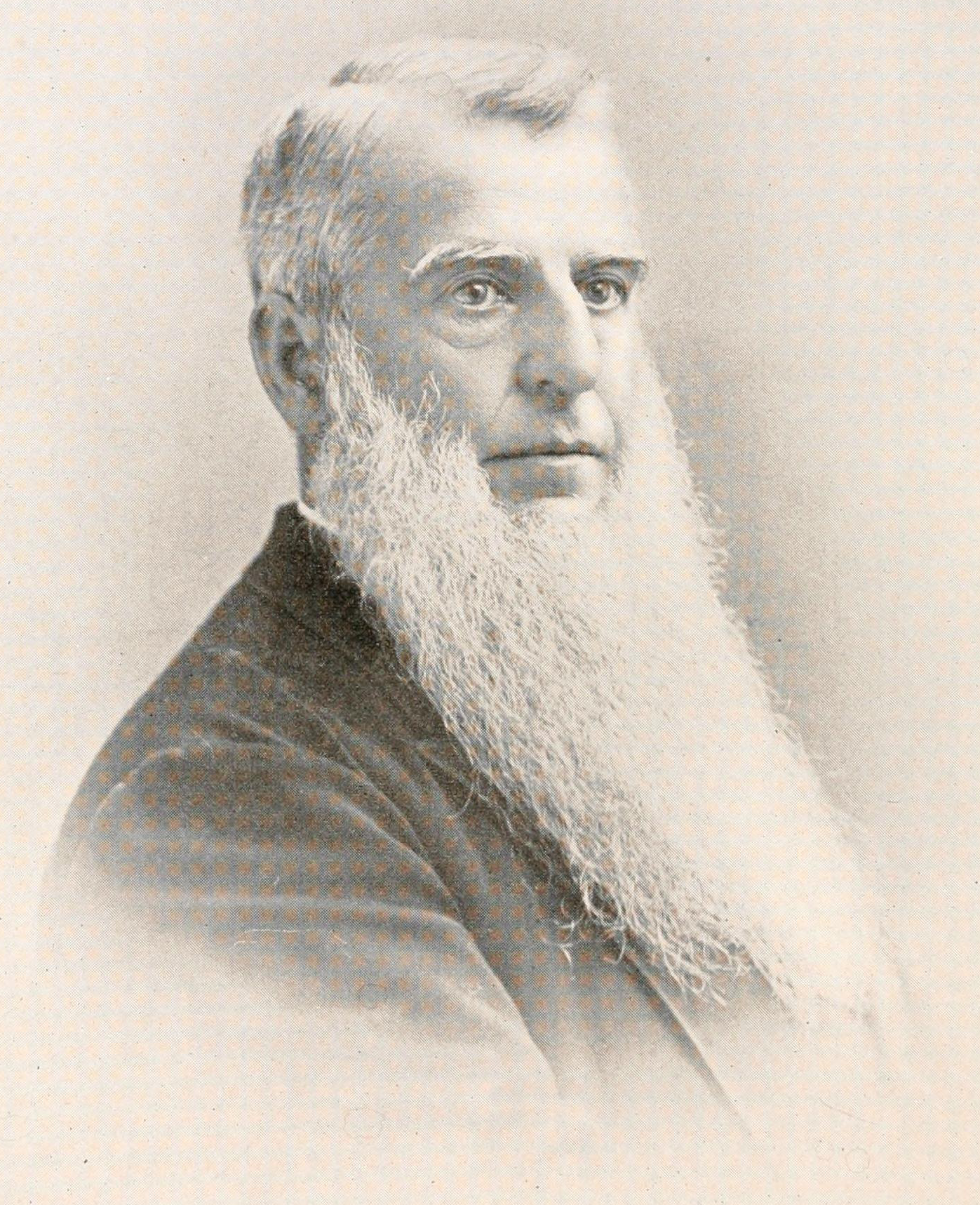
- Born: September 2, 1826; Florida, Massachusetts
- Died: June 28, 1902 (aged 75); Waterbury, Connecticut
- Occupation: Librarian
- Known for: Research on Cynipidae
- Spouses: Sarah A. Tomlinson (m. 1848; died 1848); Lovina Alcott (m. 1855; died 1880); Margaret D. Judd (m. 1884–1902)
- Children: 3

Signature
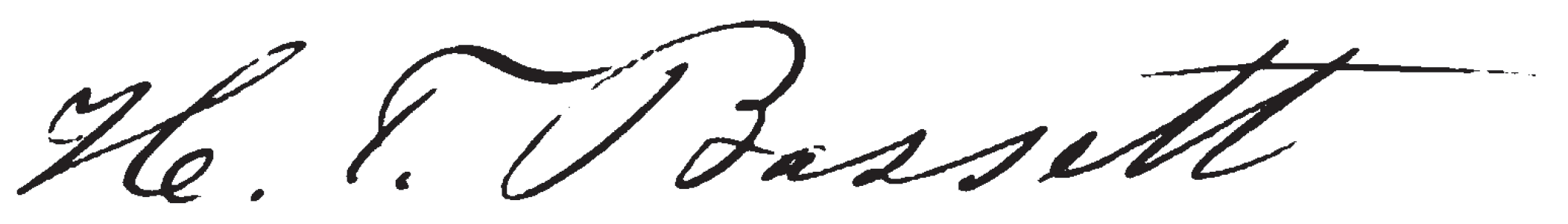

Homer Franklin Bassett (September 2, 1826 – June 28, 1902) was an American hymenopterist specializing in gall wasps. In addition, he was the librarian of Silas Bronson Library in Waterbury, Connecticut.

== Early life and education ==
Bassett was born on September 2, 1826, in the town of Florida, Massachusetts. His parents were Ezra and Keziah (née Witt) Bassett. In 1836 he and his father moved to Rockport, Ohio. He enrolled in Oberlin College in 1847, but due to poor health he had to leave the following year. He returned to New England in 1849.

== Work as librarian ==
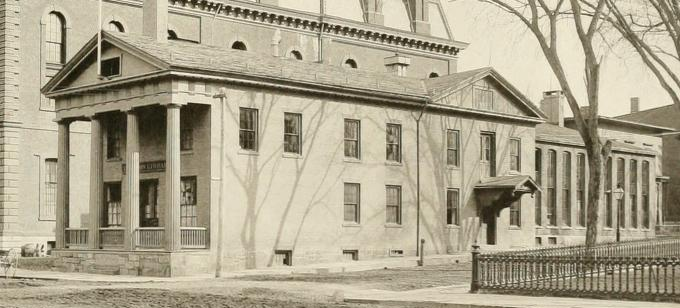
Silas Bronson Library, prior to move

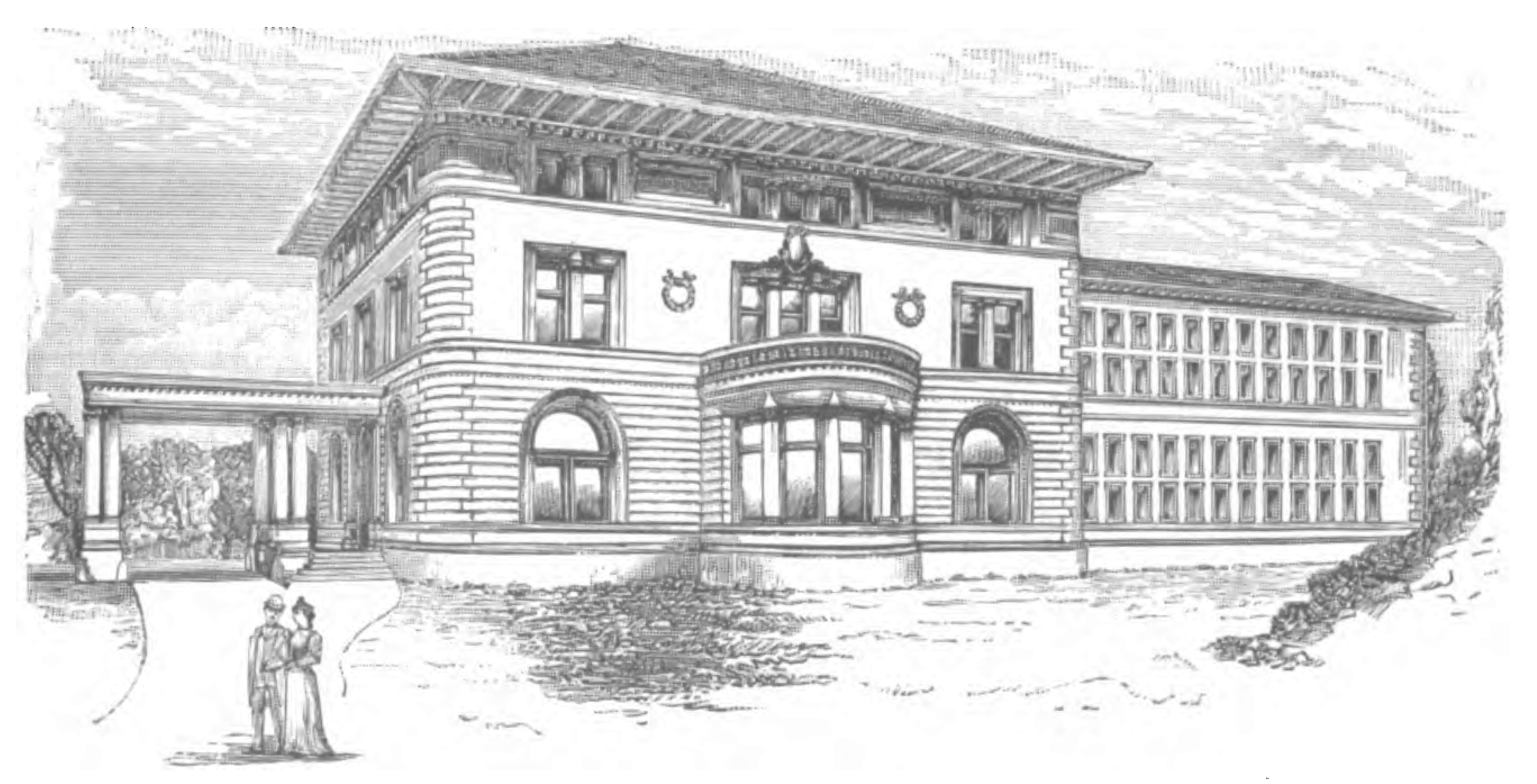
Architectural sketch of the new library, designed by Cady, Berg & See

Bassett worked at the Silas Bronson Library in Waterbury, Connecticut for nearly thirty years. He started work on September 1, 1872, after the resignation of W. I. Fletcher, its first librarian. The number of volumes in the library more than quadrupled in his first five years. Bassett also made a card catalog of the collection's 2,800 pamphlets. He also was the librarian during the move to a new building in 1894. He also opened a children's library in 1898.

Bassett resigned from his position in 1901 due to poor health.

== Work as naturalist ==
Over the course of his life, Bassett described 125 species of gall wasp. He became a corresponding member of the American Entomological Society in 1863 and published various papers in its Proceedings and its Transactions. Basset had the largest privately owned collection of Hymenoptera in the United States. He donated his collection of gall wasps, including his various holotypes to the American Entomological Society in 1901; it contained approximately 6,300 specimens. A collection consisting of a selection of his paratypes was also donated to the American Museum of Natural History after his death. In 1887, William Harris Ashmead named the genus Bassettia after him.

Bassett was also described as "one of the best known of the early botanists" in the vicinity of Waterbury. His collection was deposited at the Mattatuck Museum's herbarium.

== Death ==
Bassett died on June 28, 1902, at 4:20 am at the age of 75. He died in his home in Waterbury due to heart and kidney disease. His obituary appeared in Entomologist's Monthly Magazine and Entomological News, as well as in The Hartford Courant. His death was also reported in The American Naturalist and The Boston Sunday Globe.
