= Grahamstoneia =

Scientific classification
- Kingdom: Animalia
- Phylum: Arthropoda
- Class: Insecta
- Order: Hymenoptera
- Family: Cynipidae
- Subfamily: Cynipinae
- Tribe: Cynipini
- Genus: Grahamstoneia; Melika & Nicholls, 2021
- Species: G. humboldti

Binomial name
- Grahamstoneia humboldti Melika & Nicholls, 2021

Genus of gall wasps

Grahamstoneia is a genus of oak gall wasps in the family Cynipidae. The genus is monotypic, with the singular species Grahamstoneia humboldti.

Grahamstoneia is named after cynipidologist and entomologist Graham Stone.

The genus occurs in the southwestern Nearctic and induces galls on Quercus vacciniifolia and Quercus chrysolepis.
