= Xanthoteras =

Scientific classification
- Kingdom: Animalia
- Phylum: Arthropoda
- Class: Insecta
- Order: Hymenoptera
- Family: Cynipidae
- Subfamily: Cynipinae
- Tribe: Cynipini
- Genus: Xanthoteras; Ashmead, 1897

Genus of wasp

Xanthoteras is a genus of gall-inducing cynipid wasp that was first organized by William Harris Ashmead. Species include the ball-tipped gall wasp, which was previously included in the genus Trigonapsis.
