= Alveoplectrus lilli =

Scientific classification
- Kingdom: Animalia
- Phylum: Arthropoda
- Clade: Pancrustacea
- Class: Insecta
- Order: Hymenoptera
- Family: Eulophidae
- Genus: Alveoplectrus
- Species: A. lilli

Binomial name
- Alveoplectrus lilli Gates, 2010

Species of wasp

Alveoplectrus lilli is a species of wasp from the Eulophidae family. It was described by Michael W. Gates in 2010. It has only been sighted in Brazil, and can be identified by the presence of a transverse carina under its ocelli.

== Etymology ==
The species was named in honor of the Limacodid zoologist John Lill, who was also known for his efforts in rearing parasitoids.
