= Striatoandricus =

Scientific classification
- Kingdom: Animalia
- Phylum: Arthropoda
- Class: Insecta
- Order: Hymenoptera
- Family: Cynipidae
- Tribe: Cynipini
- Genus: Striatoandricus; Pujade-Villar, 2020

Type species
- Andricus georgei Pujade-Villar, 2011

Genus of insects

Striatoandricus is a genus of Neotropical gall wasps (Cynipidae). There are six described species, four of which were formerly included in Andricus. The genus is morphologically similar to Andricus but are not closely related phylogenetically. The genus is named after the striations on the metasomal segments and its superficial resemblance to Andricus.

All species induce galls on oaks in which their larvae live and feed.

== Species ==
Recognized species include:

- Striatoandricus aciculatus (Beutenmüller, 1909)
- Striatoandricus barriosi (Medianero & Nieves-Aldrey, 2019)
- Striatoandricus cuixarti Pujade-Villar, 2020
- Striatoandricus furnessulus (Weld, 1944)
- Striatoandricus furnessae (Weld, 1913)
- Striatogandricus georgei (Pujade-Villar, 2011)
- Striatoandricus guatemalensis (Cameron, 1883)
- Striatoandricus maesi (Pujade-Villar, 2015)
- Striatoandricus nievesaldreyi (Pujade-Villar, 2011)
- Striatoandricus sanchezi Pujade-Villar, 2020
- Striatoandricus tenuicornis (Bassett, 1881)
