= Alveoplectrus floridanus =

Scientific classification
- Kingdom: Animalia
- Phylum: Arthropoda
- Clade: Pancrustacea
- Class: Insecta
- Order: Hymenoptera
- Family: Eulophidae
- Genus: Alveoplectrus
- Species: A. floridanus

Binomial name
- Alveoplectrus floridanus Wijesekara & Schauff, 1997

Species of insect

Alveoplectrus floridanus is a species of insect from the Eulophidae family. It is the type species of Alveoplectrus, and was described by Wijesekara & Schauff in 1997. Its body length ranges from 1.2 to 2.0 mm.

== Etymology ==
The species is named after Florida, where it is distributed.
