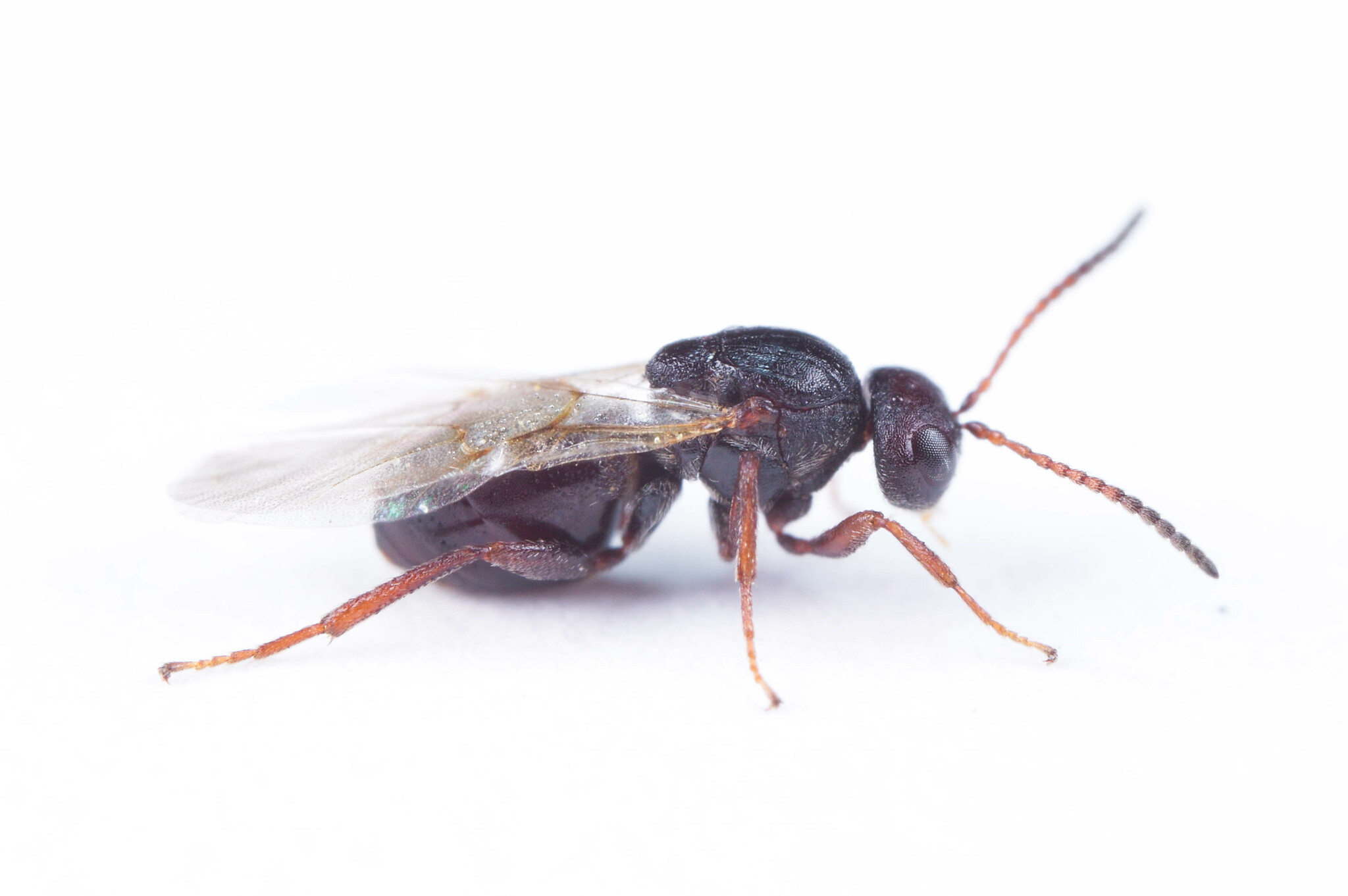
- Bassettia gemmae

Scientific classification
- Kingdom: Animalia
- Phylum: Arthropoda
- Clade: Pancrustacea
- Class: Insecta
- Order: Hymenoptera
- Family: Cynipidae
- Tribe: Cynipini
- Genus: Bassettia; Ashmead, 1887

Type species
- Bassettia floridana Ashmead, 1887

= Bassettia =

Genus of wasps

Bassettia is a genus of gall wasps found in North America.

== Taxonomic history ==
This genus was circumscribed by William Harris Ashmead in 1887. Ashmead named the genus after "Mr. H. F. Bassett, of Waterbury, Conn., who has done so much towards advancing our knowledge of these intricate Hymenopters". Two species were included in the genus's initial circumscription: B. floridana, described in the same work, and B. tenuicornis. Bassett had described the latter species in 1881, placing it in the genus Cynips.

Ashmead later designated B. floridana as the genus's type species.

== Species ==
A 2007 revision of the genus by G. Melika and W. G. Abrahamson recognizes the following eight species in this genus:

- Bassettia archboldi Melika & Abrahamson, 2007 — Florida
- Bassettia floridana Ashmead, 1887 — Connecticut, Florida
- Bassettia gemmae Ashmead, 1896 — Missouri, Illinois, District of Columbia
- Bassettia ligni Kinsey, 1922 — California, Oregon
- Bassettia pallida Ashmead, 1896 — Georgia, Florida
- Bassettia tenuana Weld, 1921 — New Mexico
- Bassettia virginiana Melika & Abrahamson, 2007 — Virginia
- Bassettia weldi Melika & Abrahamson, 2007 — Arizona

Subsequent changes include the addition of:

- Bassettia caulicola Medianero & Nieves-Aldrey, 2010 — Panama

=== Former species ===
Melika and Abrahamson transferred or restored these species from Bassettia to Callirhytis Foerster, 1869 in 2002. They had been included in Weld's 1951 taxonomy of Bassettia.

- Callirhytis aquaticae Ashmead, 1887
- Callirhytis ceropteroides Bassett, 1900
- Callirhytis herberti (Weld, 1926)
- Callirhytis quercuscatesbaei Ashmead, 1881
