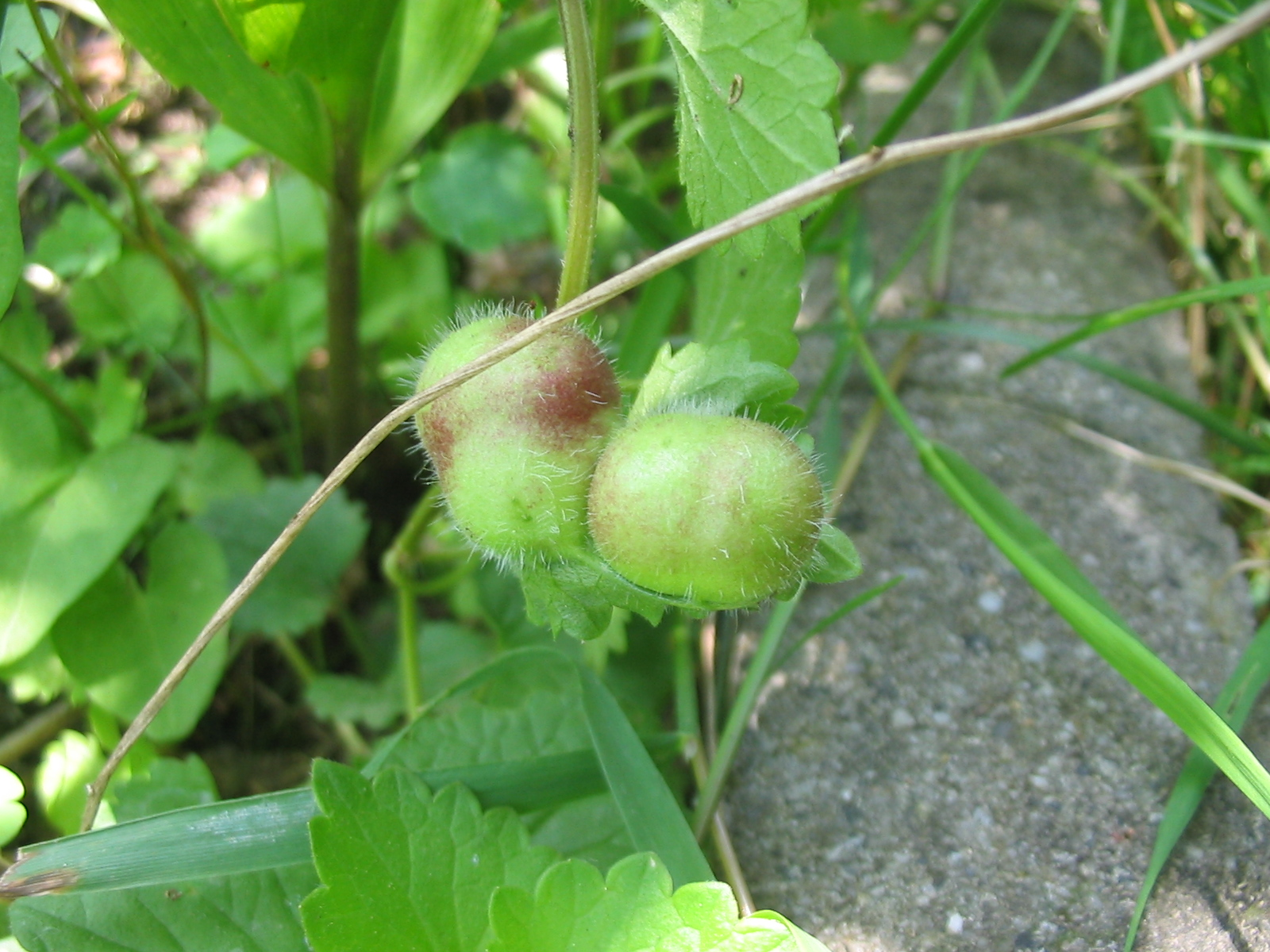

Scientific classification
- Kingdom: Animalia
- Phylum: Arthropoda
- Class: Insecta
- Order: Hymenoptera
- Family: Cynipidae
- Genus: Liposthenes
- Species: L. glechomae

Binomial name
- Liposthenes glechomae (Linnaeus, 1758)

= Liposthenes glechomae =

Species of wasp

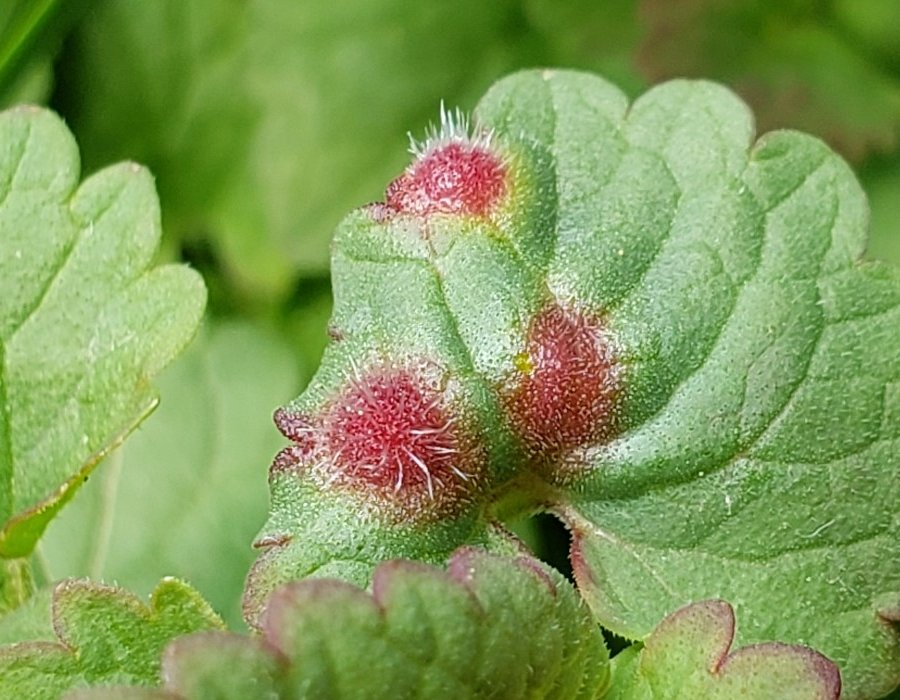
Liposthenes glechomae galls in early spring, southern Ohio

Liposthenes glechomae is a species of gall wasp in the family Cynipidae. It is found in Europe and Northern Asia (excluding China) as well as North America where it and its host plant Glechoma hederacea are invasive, non-native species. Galls may appear as small red blemishes on foliage and develop into large green galls nearly as long as one of the plant's leaves.
