= Erythres (wasp) =

Scientific classification
- Kingdom: Animalia
- Phylum: Arthropoda
- Class: Insecta
- Order: Hymenoptera
- Family: Cynipidae
- Subfamily: Cynipinae
- Tribe: Cynipini
- Genus: Erythres; Kinsey, 1937

Type species
- Erythres hastata Kinsey, 1937

Genus of gall wasps

Erythres is a genus of oak gall wasp in the family Cynipidae.

In 2002, the genus was synonymized with the more speciose genus Andricus but has since been reinstated. The genus can be differentiated by the uniform sculpture (texture) across the entire mesosoma, head, and dorsal surface of legs. Other genera have at least some variation in sculpture within and/or between these structures.

== Appearance ==
The galls formed by wasps in this genus are conical in shape. Galls are formed on species in Quercus sect. Lobatae.

== Location ==
All species are currently known from Mexico.

== Species ==
Below is a list of known species in the genus Erythres:

- Erythres hastata Kinsey, 1937
- Erythres jaculi Kinsey, 1937
