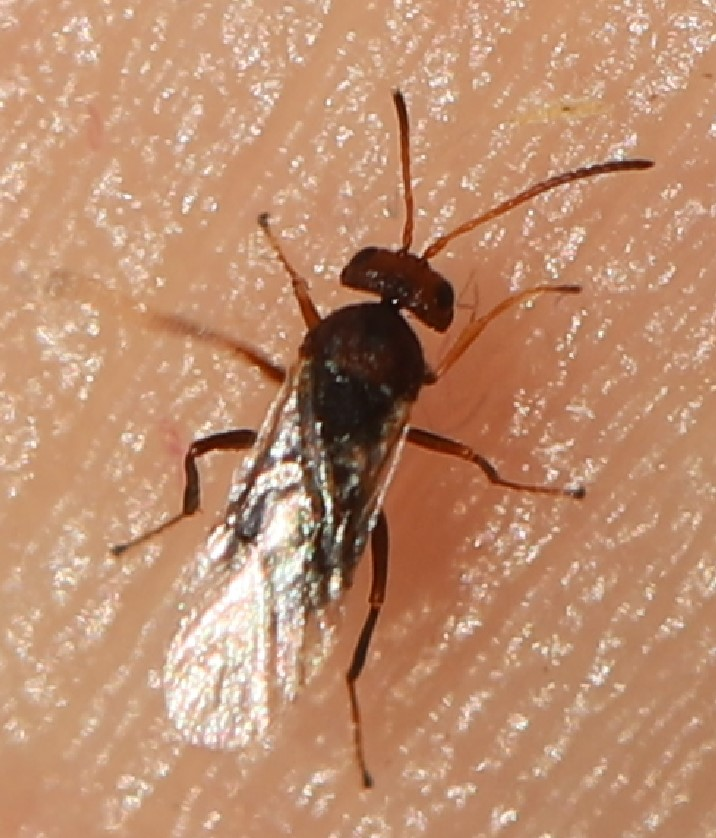
- Melikaiella

Scientific classification
- Kingdom: Animalia
- Phylum: Arthropoda
- Class: Insecta
- Order: Hymenoptera
- Family: Cynipidae
- Tribe: Cynipini
- Genus: Melikaiella; Pujade-Villar, 2014

Type species
- Melikaiella amphibolensis Pujade-Villar, 2014

= Melikaiella =

Genus of wasps

Melikaiella is a genus of wasps belonging to the family Cynipidae.

The genus is named after entomologist and cynipidologist, George Melika.

The species of this genus are found in North America.

== Species ==
The following are accepted species in the genus:

- Melikaiella amphibolensis Pujade-Villar, 2014
- Melikaiella bicolor Pujade-Villar, 2014
- Melikaiella corrugis (Bassett, 1881)
- Melikaiella flora (Weld, 1922)
- Melikaiella fructicola (Ashmead, 1897)
- Melikaiella fructuosa (Weld, 1922)
- Melikaiella lupana (Weld, 1944)
- Melikaiella ostensackeni Pujade-Villar, 2014
- Melikaiella papula (Bassett, 1881)
- Melikaiella reticulata Pujade-Villar, 2014
- Melikaiella sonorae (Weld, 1944)
- Melikaiella tumifica (Osten Sacken, 1865)
