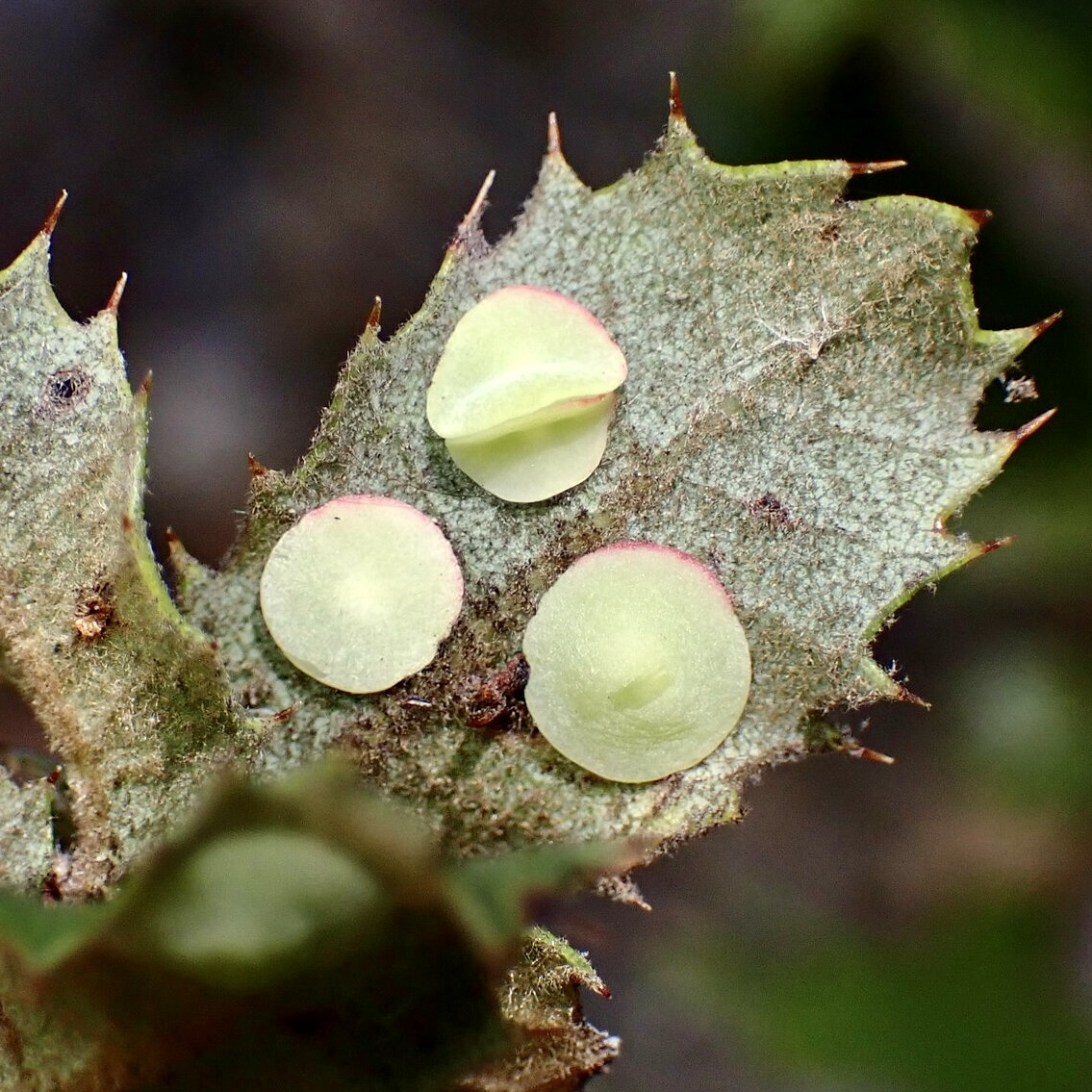
- Galls induced by Paracraspis guadaloupensis, Palo Alto, California, 2022

Scientific classification
- Kingdom: Animalia
- Phylum: Arthropoda
- Class: Insecta
- Order: Hymenoptera
- Family: Cynipidae
- Genus: Acraspis
- Species: A. guadaloupensis

Binomial name
- Acraspis guadaloupensis Fullaway 1911

= Acraspis guadaloupensis =

North American gall-inducing wasp

Acraspis guadaloupensis (also Paracraspis guadaloupensis) is a relatively uncommon species of cynipid wasp that produces galls on intermediate oaks. The intermediate oak disc wasp was first described in 1911 and has been moved between genera more than once. Distribution is limited to California in North America. The flattened galls appear on leaves of Quercus chrysolepis, the canyon live oak (or maul oak).
