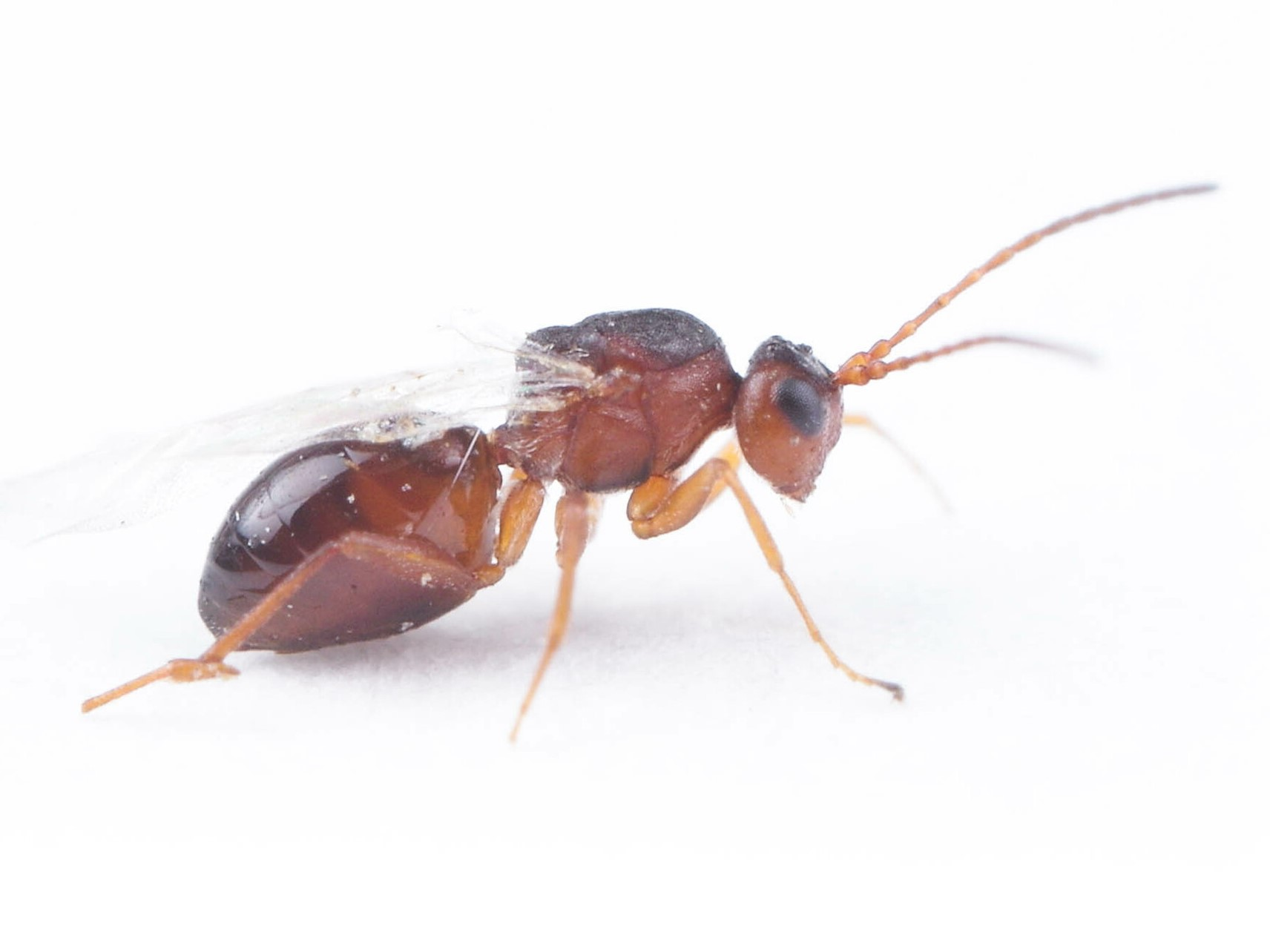
- Antistrophus minor

Scientific classification
- Kingdom: Animalia
- Phylum: Arthropoda
- Class: Insecta
- Order: Hymenoptera
- Family: Cynipidae
- Genus: Antistrophus; Walsh, 1869

= Antistrophus =

Genus of wasps

Antistrophus is a genus of about 10 species of gall wasps. The genus is only known from the Nearctic. Species of Antistrophus induce galls on plant species in four Asteraceae genera: Silphium, Lygodesmia, Chrysothamnus, and Microseris.

The genus was first named and described by Benjamin Walsh in 1869.

This genus includes the following species:

- Antistrophus bicolor Gillette, 1891
- Antistrophus chrysothamni Beutenmuller, 1908
- Antistrophus jeanae Tooker and Hanks, 2004
- Antistrophus laciniatus Gillette, 1891
- Antistrophus lygodesmiaepisum Walsh, 1869
- Antistrophus meganae Tooker and Hanks, 2004
- Antistrophus minor Gillette, 1891
- Antistrophus microseris McCracken and Egbert, 1922
- Antistrophus rufus Gillette, 1891
- Antistrophus silphii Gillette, 1891
