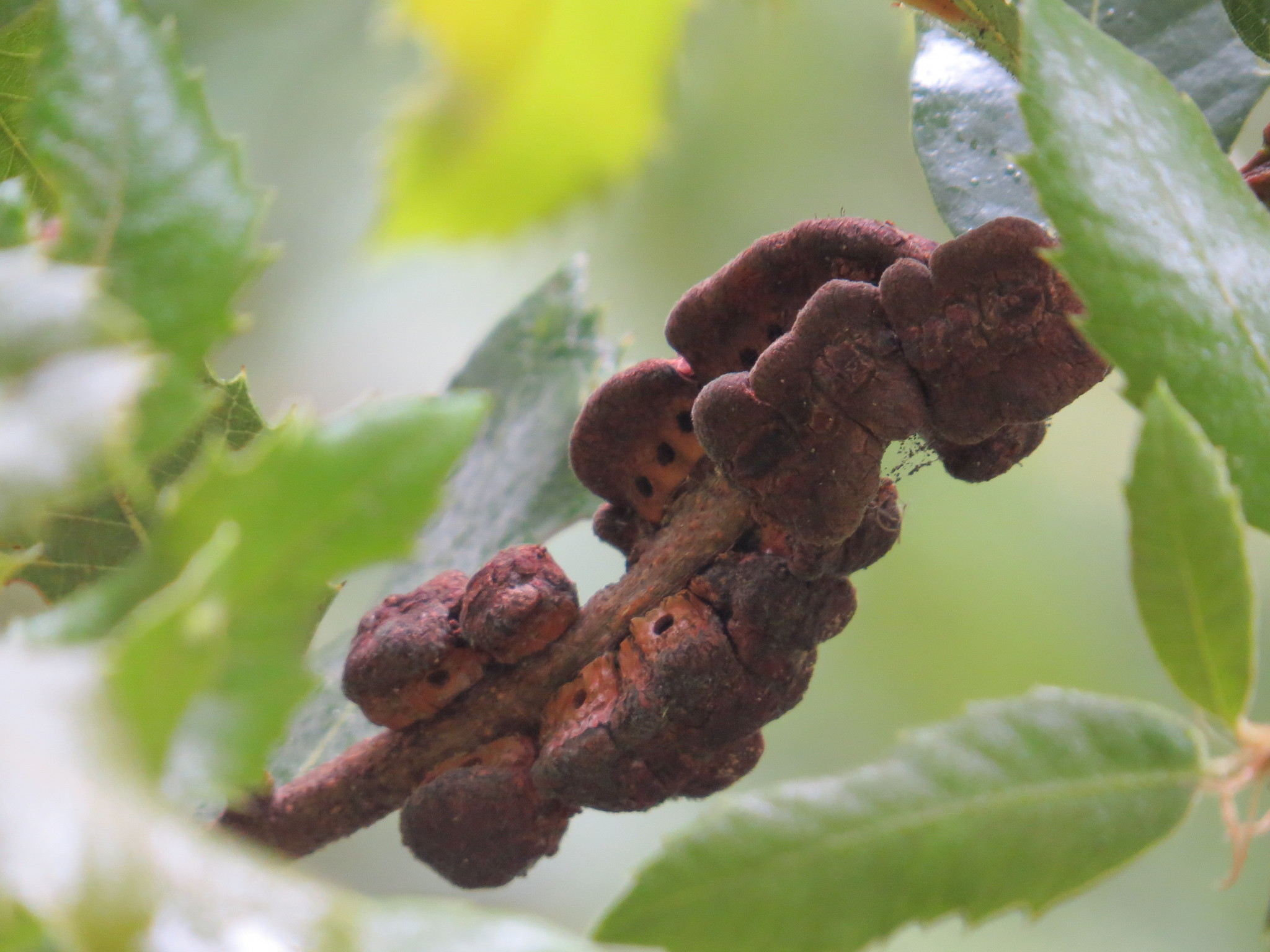
- Galls induced by Disholandricus chrysolepidis (fka Disholcaspis chrysolepidis)

Scientific classification
- Kingdom: Animalia
- Phylum: Arthropoda
- Class: Insecta
- Order: Hymenoptera
- Family: Cynipidae
- Tribe: Cynipini
- Genus: Disholandricus; Pujade-Villar, Melika & Nicholls, 2021

= Disholandricus =

Genus of insects

Disholandricus is a genus of oak gall wasps found in the Nearctic biographic realm.

== Species ==
- Disholandricus chrysolepidis
- Disholandricus lasius
- Disholandricus reniformis
- Disholandricus truckeensis

== See also ==
- Burnettweldia
