= Cycloneuroterus =

Scientific classification
- Kingdom: Animalia
- Phylum: Arthropoda
- Clade: Pancrustacea
- Class: Insecta
- Order: Hymenoptera
- Family: Cynipidae
- Subfamily: Cynipinae
- Tribe: Cynipini
- Genus: Cycloneuroterus; Melika & Tang, 2011

Type species
- Cycloneuroterus lilungi Tang, Melika & Yang, 2011

Genus of wasps

Cycloneuroterus is a genus of oak gall wasps from the family Cynipidae.

Species in this genus form galls on various Fagaceae in the Eastern Palearctic. The genus is named after one of the more common host plants (section Cyclobalanopsis), and their morphological similarity to the genus Neuroterus.

== Description ==
Cycloneuroterus belongs to a group of other genera in Cynipini which have a reduction or absence of the transscutal articulation. This transscutal articulation typically separates the mesoscutum from the complex formed by the scutellum and the axilla. Other genera in this group include Neuroterus, Trichagalma, Pseudoneuroterus, Cerroneuroterus, and Latuspina. Cycloneuroterus is distinguished from other members of this group by having distinct and complete carinae on the lateral side of the propodeum, similarly to the genus Dryocosmus.

Species in this genus form galls on various plant organs and are known from plants in the section Cyclobalanopsis of Quercus, the genus Castanopsis, and the genus Lithocarpus.

== Species ==
Known species are described from Taiwan and Japan.

The following are currently valid species in this genus:

- Cycloneuroterus abei Melika & Tang, 2016
- Cycloneuroterus akagashiphilus Wachi & Abe, 2012
- Cycloneuroterus arakashiphagus Wachi & Abe, 2012
- Cycloneuroterus ergei Tang & Melika, 2016
- Cycloneuroterus fortuitusus Tang & Melika, 2011
- Cycloneuroterus formosanus Tang & Melika, 2011
- Cycloneuroterus gilvus Tang & Melika, 2016
- Cycloneuroterus globosus Tang & Melika, 2016
- Cycloneuroterus hisashii Wachi & Abe, 2012
- Cycloneuroterus jianwui Tang & Melika, 2016
- Cycloneuroterus lilungi Tang, Melika & Yang, 2011
- Cycloneuroterus lohsei Melika & Tang, 2016
- Cycloneuroterus longinuxus Tang & Melika, 2011
- Cycloneuroterus lirongchiuae Melika & Tang, 2011
- Cycloneuroterus megaformosanus Melika & Tang, 2020
- Cycloneuroterus tumiclavus Tang & Melika, 2016
- Cycloneuroterus uraianus Tang & Melika, 2016
