= Liposthenes =

Scientific classification
- Kingdom: Animalia
- Phylum: Arthropoda
- Class: Insecta
- Order: Hymenoptera
- Family: Cynipidae
- Genus: Liposthenes; Förster, 1869

Genus of wasps

Liposthenes is a genus of gall wasps in the family Cynipidae. It forms galls on plants from the genus Glechoma. There are at least two described species in Liposthenes.

== Species ==
These two species belong to the genus Liposthenes:

- Liposthenes glechomae (Linnaeus, 1758)
- Liposthenes kerneri (Wachtl, 1891)
