= Barucynips =

Scientific classification
- Kingdom: Animalia
- Phylum: Arthropoda
- Class: Insecta
- Order: Hymenoptera
- Family: Cynipidae
- Tribe: Cynipini
- Genus: Barucynips; Medianero & Nieves-Aldrey, 2013

Genus of wasps

Barucynips is a genus of gall wasp consisting of a single species described in 2013: Barucynips panamensis.
