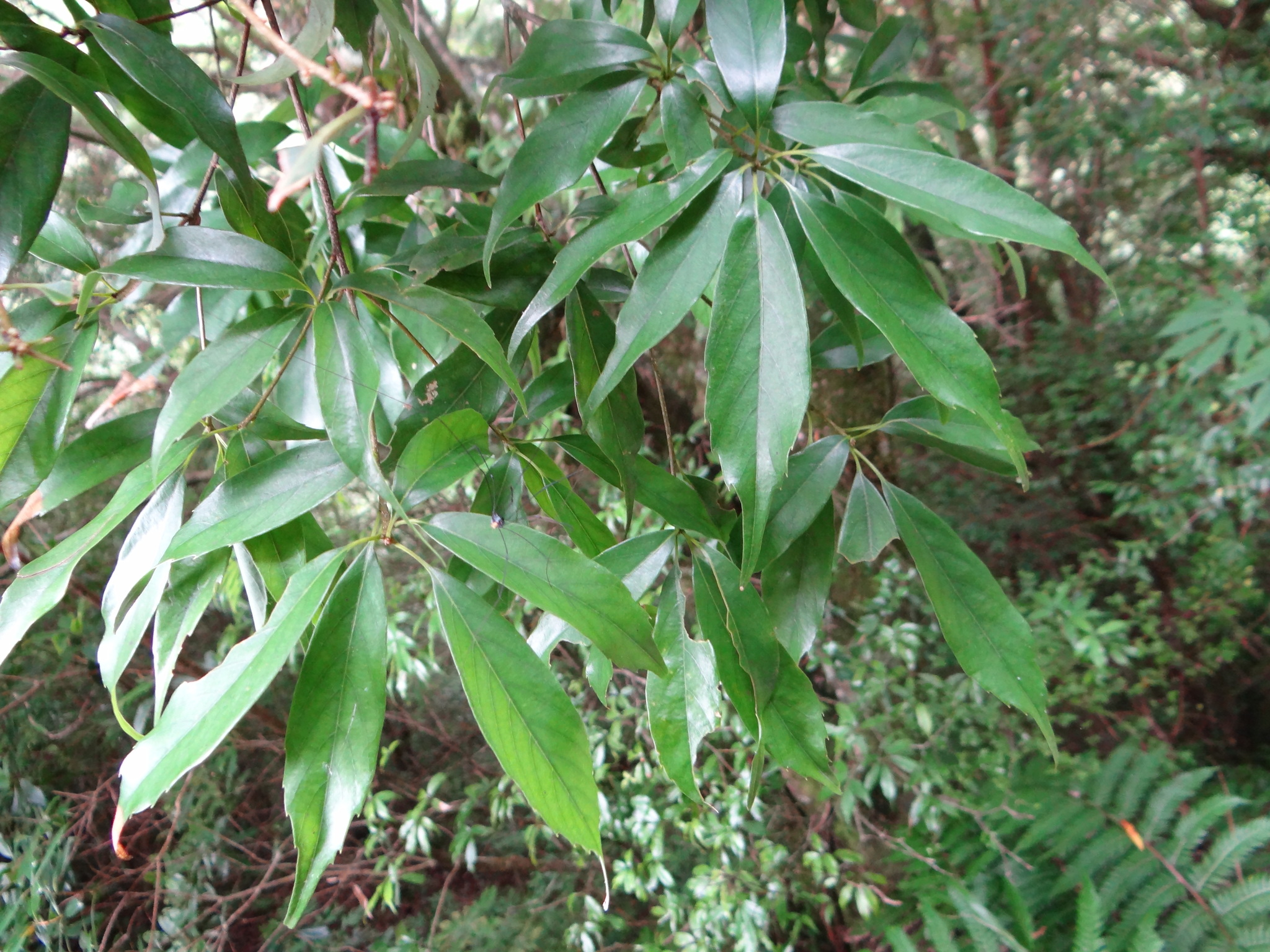

Conservation status
- Least Concern (IUCN 3.1)

Scientific classification
- Kingdom: Plantae
- Clade: Embryophytes
- Clade: Tracheophytes
- Clade: Spermatophytes
- Clade: Angiosperms
- Clade: Eudicots
- Clade: Rosids
- Order: Fagales
- Family: Fagaceae
- Genus: Quercus
- Subgenus: Quercus subg. Cerris
- Section: Quercus sect. Cyclobalanopsis
- Species: Q. longinux

Binomial name
- Quercus longinux Hayata

Synonyms
- List: Cyclobalanopsis kanehirae Nakai; Cyclobalanopsis longinux (Hayata) Schottky; Cyclobalanopsis longinux var. kanehirae (Nakai) J.C.Liao; Cyclobalanopsis longinux var. kuoi J.C.Liao; Cyclobalanopsis longinux var. lativiolaceifolia J.C.Liao; Cyclobalanopsis longinux var. pseudomyrsinifolia (Hayata) J.C.Liao; Cyclobalanopsis pseudomyrsinifolia (Hayata) Schottky; Cyclobalanopsis taichuensis (Hayata) Schottky; Quercus glauca subsp. longinux (Hayata) Menitsky; Quercus glauca var. longinux (Hayata) Menitsky; Quercus kanehirae Nakai; Quercus longinux var. kanehirai (Nakai) J.C.Liao; Quercus longinux var. kuoi (J.C.Liao) C.F.Shen in C.F.Shen & T.S.Liu; Quercus longinux var. pseudomyrsinifolia (Hayata) J.C.Liao; Quercus pseudomyrsinifolia Hayata; Quercus taichuensis Hayata

= Quercus longinux =

Species of oak tree

Quercus longinux is an uncommon Asian species of trees in the beech family Fagaceae. It has only been found in Taiwan. It is placed in subgenus Cerris, section Cyclobalanopsis.

Quercus longinux is a tree. Leaves can be as much as 8 cm long. Acorn is up to 12 mm long, narrower than those of most other species in the subgenus.
