= Coffeikokkos =

Scientific classification
- Kingdom: Animalia
- Phylum: Arthropoda
- Class: Insecta
- Order: Hymenoptera
- Family: Cynipidae
- Tribe: Cynipini
- Genus: Coffeikokkos; Pujade-Villar & Melika in Pujade-Villar, Hanson & Melika, 2012

Genus of wasps

Coffeikokkos is a genus of gall wasp.

== Species ==
- Coffeikokkos copeyensis Pujade-Villar & Melika, 2012
- Coffeikokkos korytkowskii Medianero & Nieves-Aldrey, 2013
