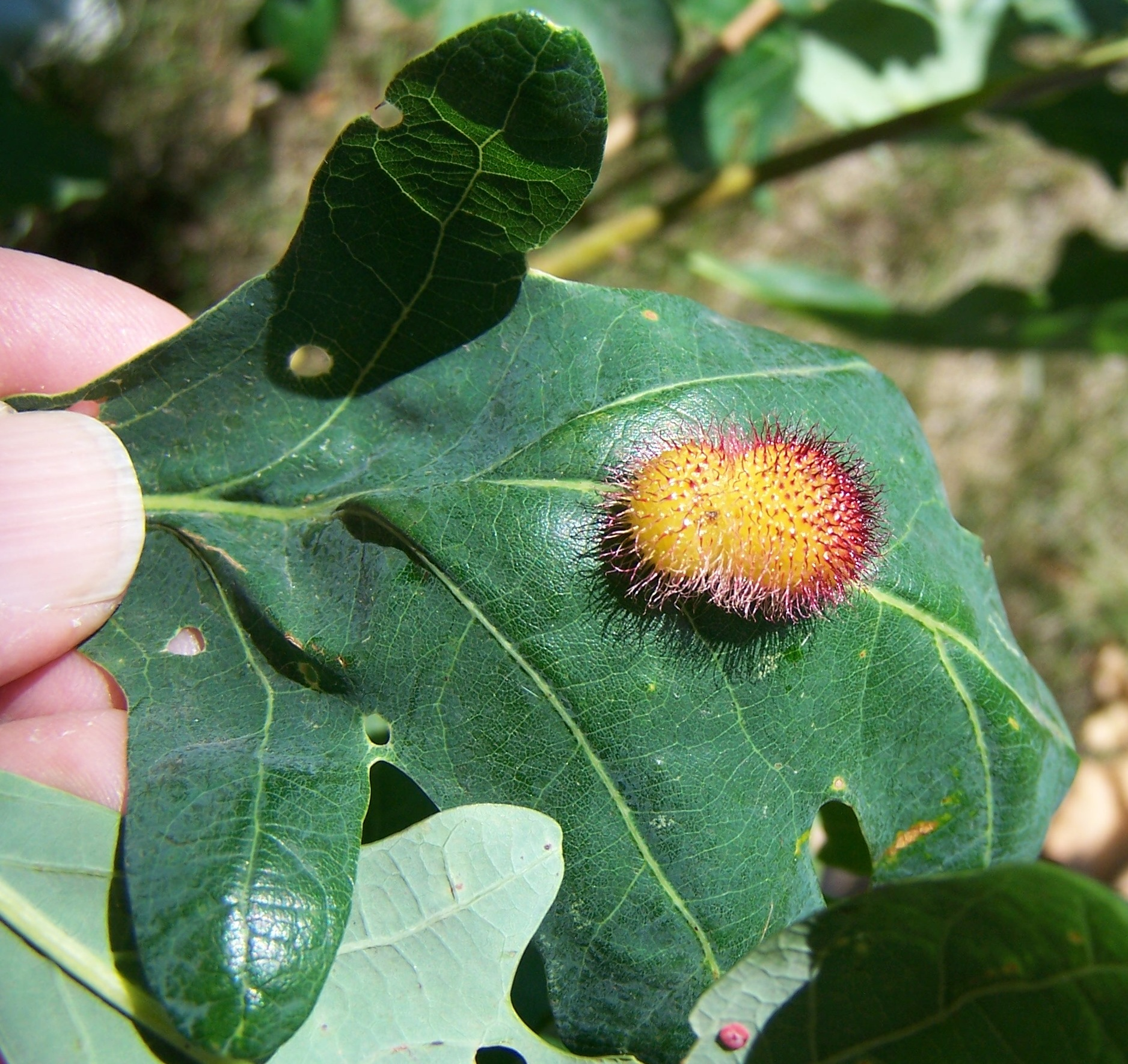
- Hedgehog gall caused by A. erinacei

Scientific classification
- Kingdom: Animalia
- Phylum: Arthropoda
- Class: Insecta
- Order: Hymenoptera
- Family: Cynipidae
- Tribe: Cynipini
- Genus: Acraspis; Mayr, 1881

Type species
- Cynips pezomachoides Osten Sacken, 1862

= Acraspis =

Genus of wasps

Acraspis is a genus of gall wasps in the family Cynipidae. The following species are recognised in the genus Acraspis:

- Acraspis alaria
- Acraspis echini
- Acraspis erinacei - hedgehog gall wasp
- Acraspis gemula
- Acraspis longicornis
- Acraspis quercushirta - jewel oak gall wasp
- Acraspis pezomachoides - oak pea gall wasp
- Acraspis prinoides
- Acraspis villosa
