= Lewis Hart Weld =

American entomologist

Lewis H. Weld
- Born: December 13, 1875
- Died: April 22, 1964 (aged 88)
- Education: University of Michigan
- Scientific career
- Fields: Entomology
- Workplaces: Evanston Academy, USDA

Lewis Hart Weld (1875-1964) was an American entomologist, who worked for the United States Department of Agriculture (USDA).

== Education ==
Lewis Weld attended the University of Rochester, University of Michigan, and Cornell University, where he studied entomology. In 1904, Weld went to teach at Evanston Academy, where he began his lifelong research of gall wasps.

== Career ==
Weld made several field trips during his career; in 1919, and another from 1923 to 1924. During this time he worked for the Bureau of Entomology of the USDA. Lewis Weld resigned his official position in 1924, but continued to independently pursue his interests, and continued to collaborate with the USDA for over 40 years.

== Personal life ==
Weld married plant pathologist Clara Octavia Jamieson in 1915; they did not have any children.
