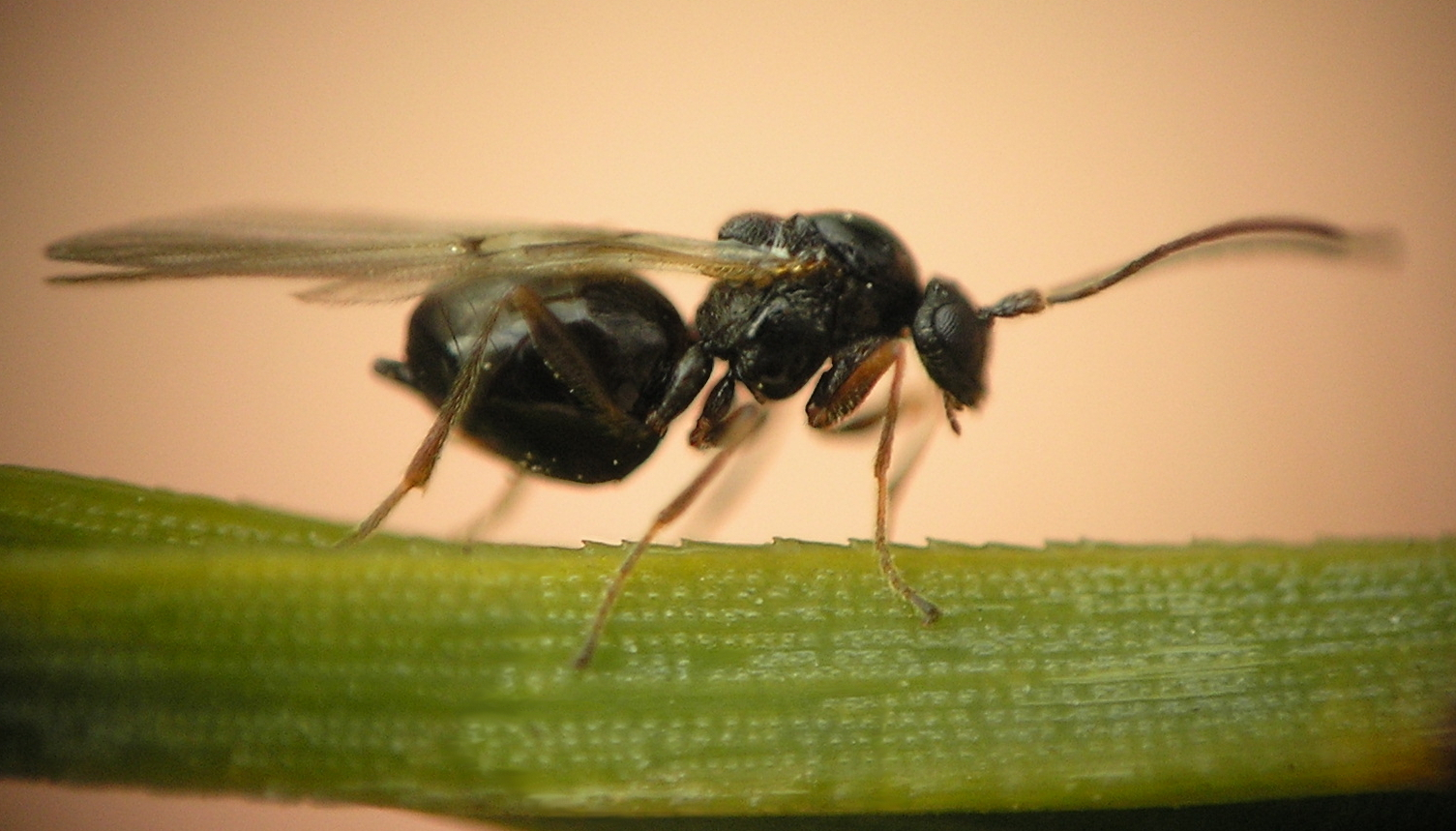
- Cynips sp.

Scientific classification
- Kingdom: Animalia
- Phylum: Arthropoda
- Clade: Pancrustacea
- Class: Insecta
- Order: Hymenoptera
- Family: Cynipidae
- Subfamily: Cynipinae
- Tribe: Cynipini; Leach, 1815

Diversity
- around 1000 species

= Cynipini =

Tribe of wasps

Cynipini is a tribe of gall wasps. These insects induce galls in plants of the beech and oak family, Fagaceae. They are known commonly as the oak gall wasps. It is the largest cynipid tribe, with 62 genera and ~1000 recognized species, most of which are associated with oaks. The tribe is mainly native to the Holarctic, with ~680 known species in the Nearctic region.

Cynipini wasps can act as ecosystem engineers. Their galls can become hosts of inquilines, and the wasps themselves are hosts to parasitoids.

Most of these wasps undergo cyclical parthenogenesis, sometimes reproducing sexually, and sometimes producing young without fertilization.

== Genera ==
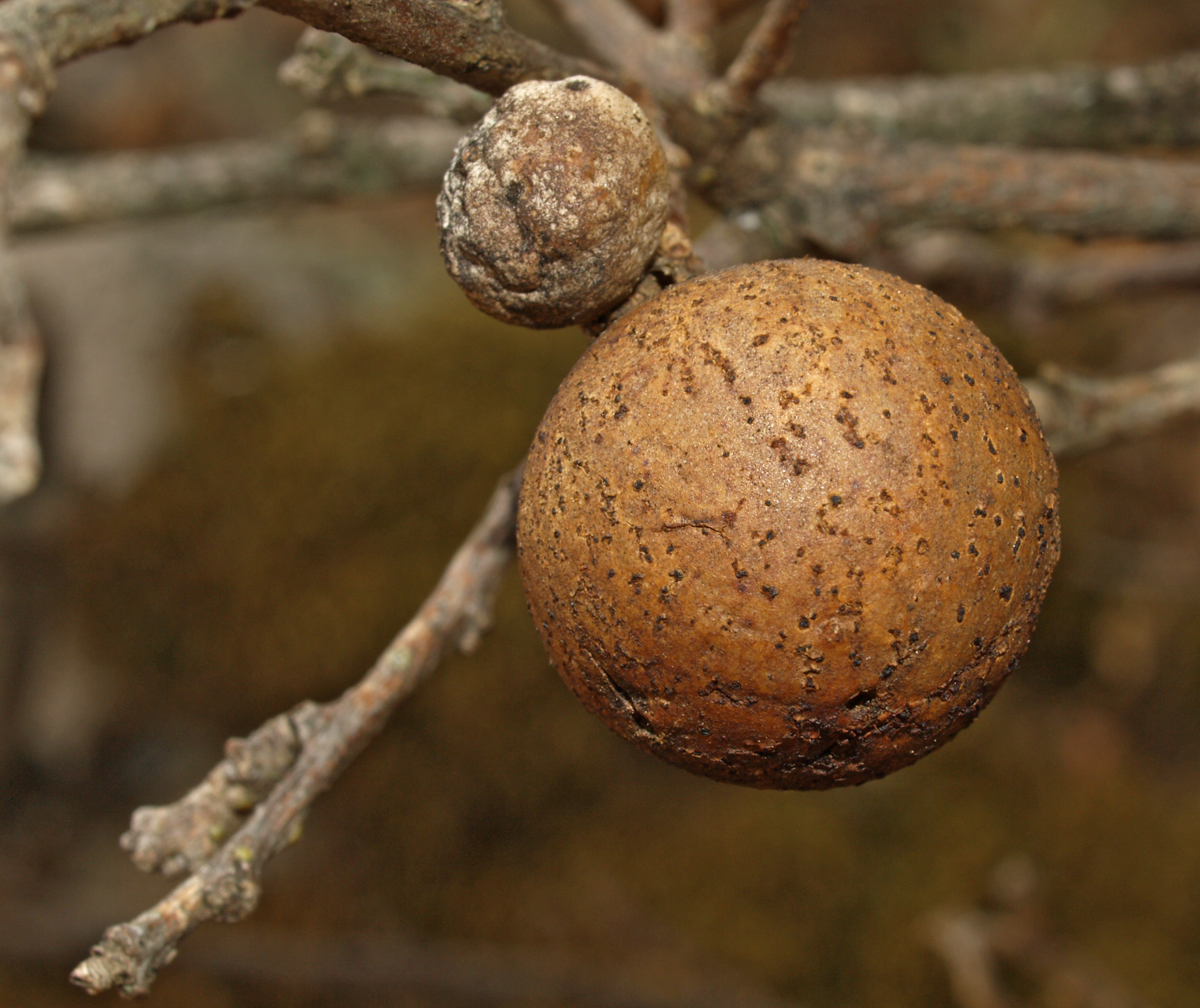
Gall induced on Pyrenean oak Quercus pyrenaica by Andricus kollari

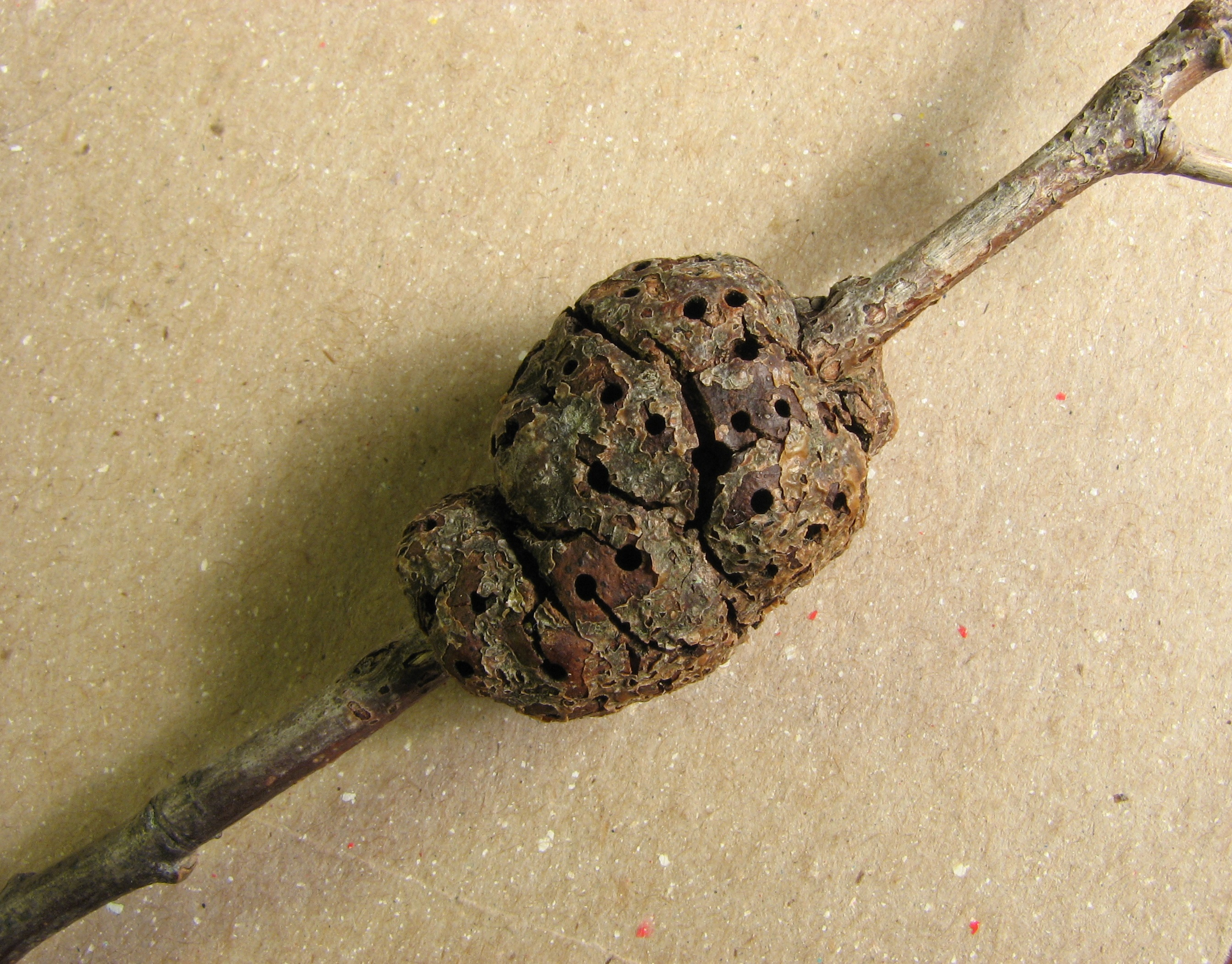
Gall induced by Callirhytis quercuspunctata on oak

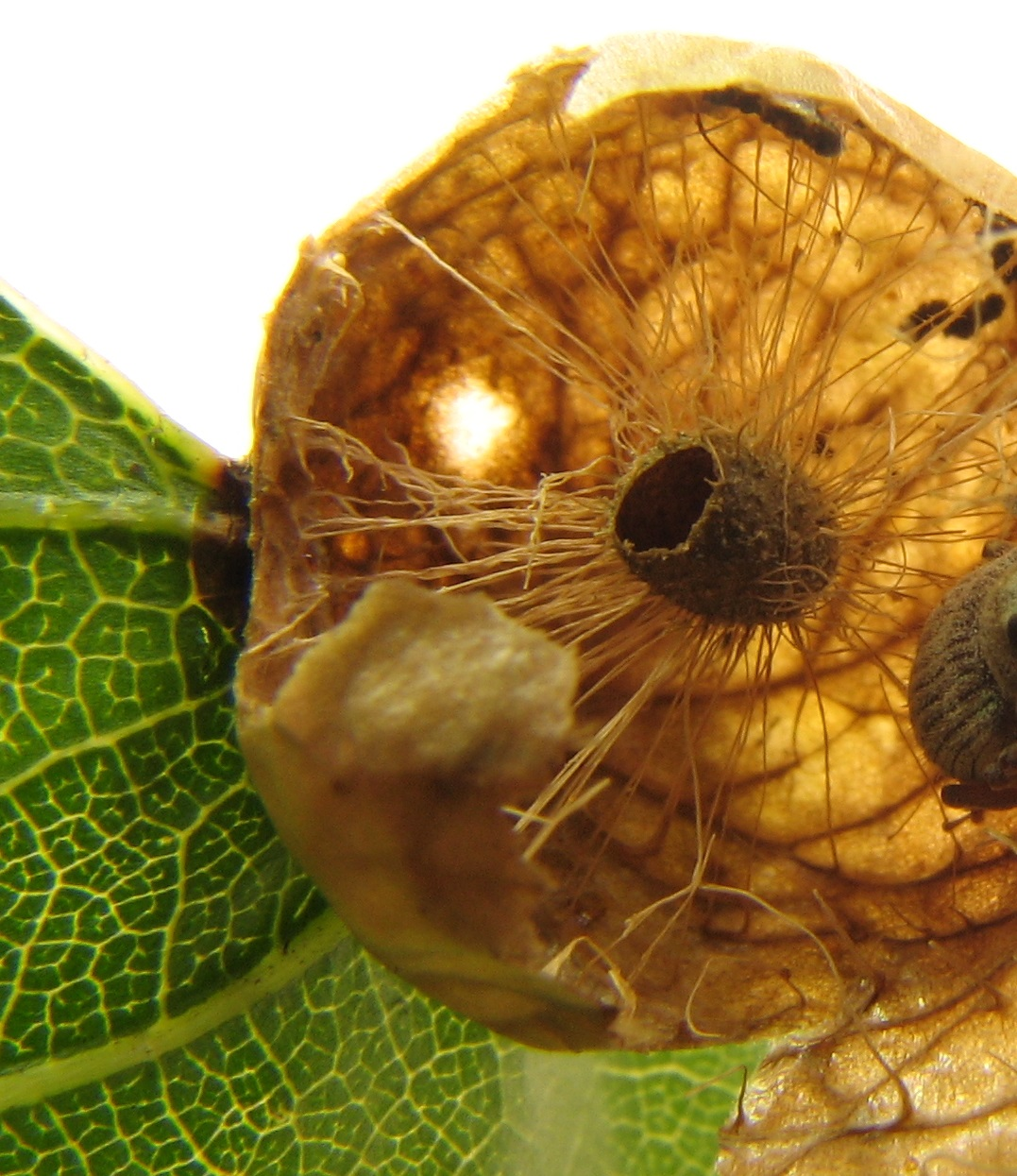
Amphibolips quercusinanis gall on oak

- Acraspis
- Amphibolips
- Andricus
- Antron
- Aphelonyx
- Atrusca
- Barucynips
- Bassettia
- Belizinella
- Belonocnema
- Besbicus
- Biorhiza
- Burnettweldia
- Callirhytis
- Cerroneuroterus
- Chilaspis
- Chrysolepicynips
- Coffeikokkos
- Cyclocynips
- Cycloneuroterus
- Cynips
- Disholandricus
- Disholcaspis
- Dros
- Druon
- Dryocosmus
- Erythres
- Eumayria
- Eumayriella
- Femuros
- Feron
- Grahamstoneia
- Heteroecus
- Heocynips
- Holocynips
- Kinseyella
- Kokkocynips
- Latuspina
- Loxaulus
- Melikaiella
- Neuroterus
- Neuroandricus
- Nichollsiella
- Nubilantron
- Odontocynips
- Paracraspis
- Philonix
- Phylloteras
- Plagiotrochus
- Prokius
- Protobalandricus
- Pseudoneuroterus
- Reticulodermis
- Sphaeroteras
- Striatoandricus
- Trichagalma
- Trichoteras
- Trigonaspis
- Ussuraspis
- Xanthoteras
- Zapatella
- Zopheroteras
