= William Harris Ashmead =

American entomologist

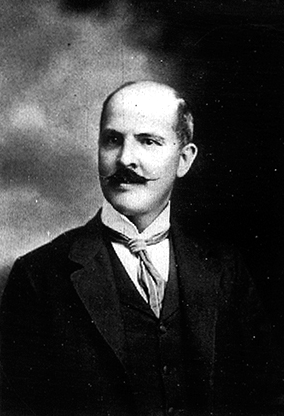
- Born: September 19, 1855; Philadelphia, Pennsylvania, U.S.
- Died: October 17, 1908 (aged 53); Washington D.C., U.S.
- Scientific career
- Fields: Entomology

William Harris Ashmead was an American entomologist born on 19 September 1855 at Philadelphia. He died 17 October 1908 at Washington D.C.

After his studies in Philadelphia, Ashmead worked for the publisher J. B. Lippincott & Co. Later, he settled in Florida where he formed his own publishing house devoted to agriculture. He also launched the Florida Dispatch, an agricultural weekly magazine which included a headed section devoted to injurious insects.

In 1879, he began writing papers for scientific publications and, in 1887, he became a field entomologist working for the Ministry for the Agriculture of Florida. The following year, he became entomologist at the Agricultural Research station of Lake City. In 1889, he worked again for the Ministry for Agriculture. The following year, and for two years, he traveled, in particular to Germany, to perfect his entomological knowledge.

In 1895, he obtained the post of conservation assistant in the Department of Entomology of the U.S. National Museum, a position he occupied until his death. He was mainly a systematic entomologist who worked on many groups of insects, but particularly on Hymenoptera and he published approximately 260 articles in various scientific reviews.

== Works ==
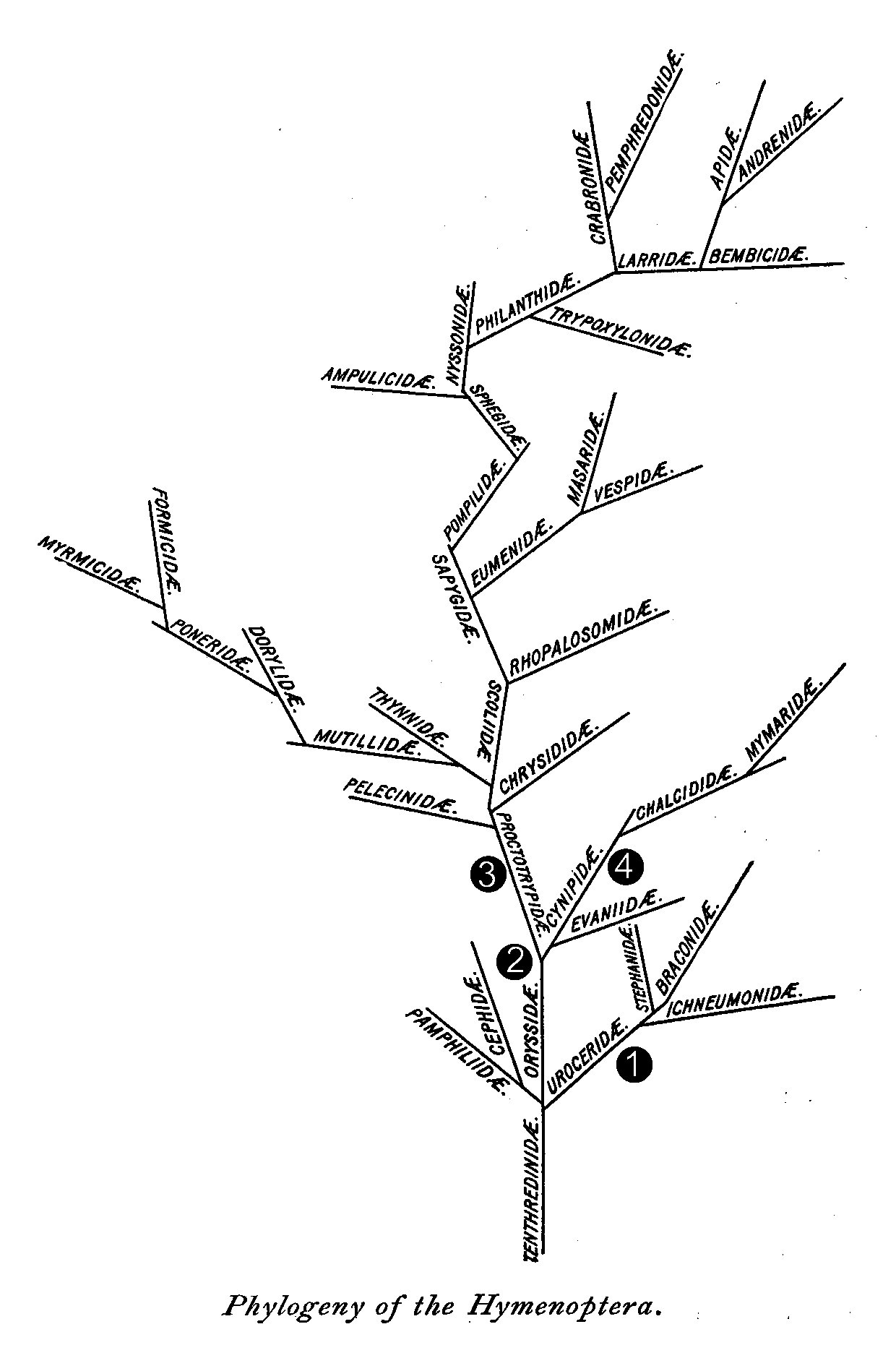
Illustration from Ashmead's The phylogeny of the Hymenoptera (1896)

Selected books:

- Monograph of the North American Proctotrypidae. (Bulletin of the US National Museum, no. 45) Washington: US GPO, 1893.
- Descriptions of New genera and species of Hymenoptera from the Philippine Islands. (Proceedings of the US National Museum, no. 29) Washington: US GPO, 1904.

Selected articles on the Order Hymenoptera:

- "Studies on the North American Proctotrupidae, with descriptions of new species from Florida." Entomol. Am. 3: 73–76, 97–100, 117–119 (1887).
- "Descriptions of some new genera and species of Canadian Proctotrupidae." Can. Entomol. 20: 48–55 (1888).
- "Description of a new genus and new species of proctotrypid bred by Mr F.W. Urich from an embiid." J. Trin. Fld. Nat. Club 2: 264-266 (1895).
- "The phylogeny of the Hymenoptera". Proc. Ent. soc. Washington, III: 326-336 (1896) .
- "Classification of the pointed-tailed wasps, or the superfamily Proctotrypoidea.-III." J. N. Y. Entomol. Soc. 11: 86-99 (1903).
- "Descriptions of new Hymenoptera from Japan-1." J. N. Y. Entomol. Soc. 12: 65-84 (1904).
- Ashmead, William H. (1905). "A skeleton of a new arrangement of the families, subfamilies, tribes and genera of the ants, or the superfamily Formicoidea" (PDF). The Canadian Entomologist. 37 (11): 381–384. doi:10.4039/Ent37381-11.
