= Andricus mukaigawae =

Scientific classification
- Kingdom: Animalia
- Phylum: Arthropoda
- Clade: Pancrustacea
- Class: Insecta
- Order: Hymenoptera
- Family: Cynipidae
- Genus: Andricus
- Species: A. mukaigawae

Binomial name
- Andricus mukaigawae (Mukaigawa, 1913)

Species of insect

Andricus mukaigawae is a species of gall wasp native to eastern Asia. It creates galls on the buds and leaves of oak trees. The galls are sometimes used by other gall wasps unable to create galls of their own, with both species sharing the gall.

== Taxonomy ==
Andricus mukaigawae is part of a species complex with several components. Some populations are classified as A. mukaigawae which is bivoltine (having two generations per year) cyclically parthenogenetic, with a karyotype of (2n = 12), producing entirely female offspring; these wasps form burr-shaped galls on Quercus aliena, Quercus mongolica, Quercus serrata, and Quercus fabrei. Other populations are classified as Andricus kashiwaphilus (2n = 10), also bivoltine and cyclically parthenogenetic, but producing flower-shaped galls on Quercus dentata, again producing entirely female offspring. There are also univoltine populations with one generation per year with thelytokous parthenogenesis in which females are produced from unfertilized eggs; these have historically been classified as Andricus targionii, but some of them form burr-shaped galls on Q. aliena while others form flower-shaped galls on Q. dentata, so A. targionii would appear to be polyphyletic.

== Distribution ==
Andricus mukaigawae has a wide distribution in eastern Asia and is found in India, Japan, Korea and Russia.

== Ecology ==
The burr-shaped galls of Andricus mukaigawae are modified live plant structures. They normally contain a single cell in which the gall wasp larva develops as it feeds on the tissues surrounding it. However many of the galls are also inhabited by the larvae of inquiline wasp species, Synergus japonicus, which is entirely dependent on the galls created by A. mukaigawae. The inquiline larvae create their own cells in the living plant tissue. The gall additionally often houses parasitic chalcid wasps, Torymus species, which are parasitoids of both the gall wasps.

The bacterium Wolbachia is an intracellular parasite of many gall wasps, including Andricus mukaigawae and Synergus japonicus. Historically it has been assumed that vertical transmission of Wolbachia occurs, from parent insects to their offspring through the cytoplasm of the eggs; it has now been shown that horizontal transmission can also occur between the different wasp species present in the gall, and genetic recombination events can also occur.
