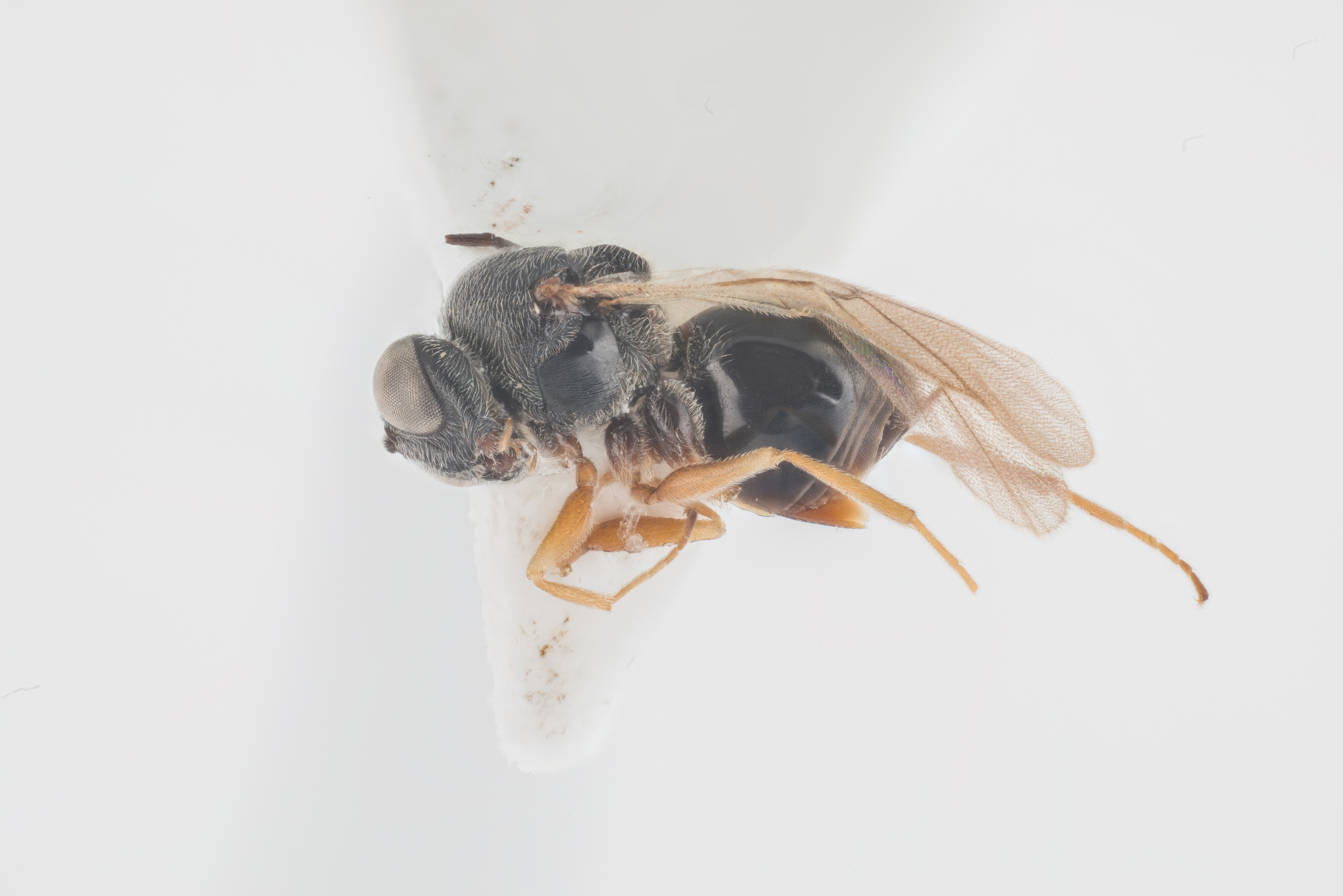
- A female Periclistus caninae

Scientific classification
- Kingdom: Animalia
- Phylum: Arthropoda
- Clade: Pancrustacea
- Class: Insecta
- Order: Hymenoptera
- Family: Cynipidae
- Subfamily: Cynipinae
- Tribe: Diastrophini
- Genus: Periclistus; Förster, 1869

= Periclistus =

Genus of wasps

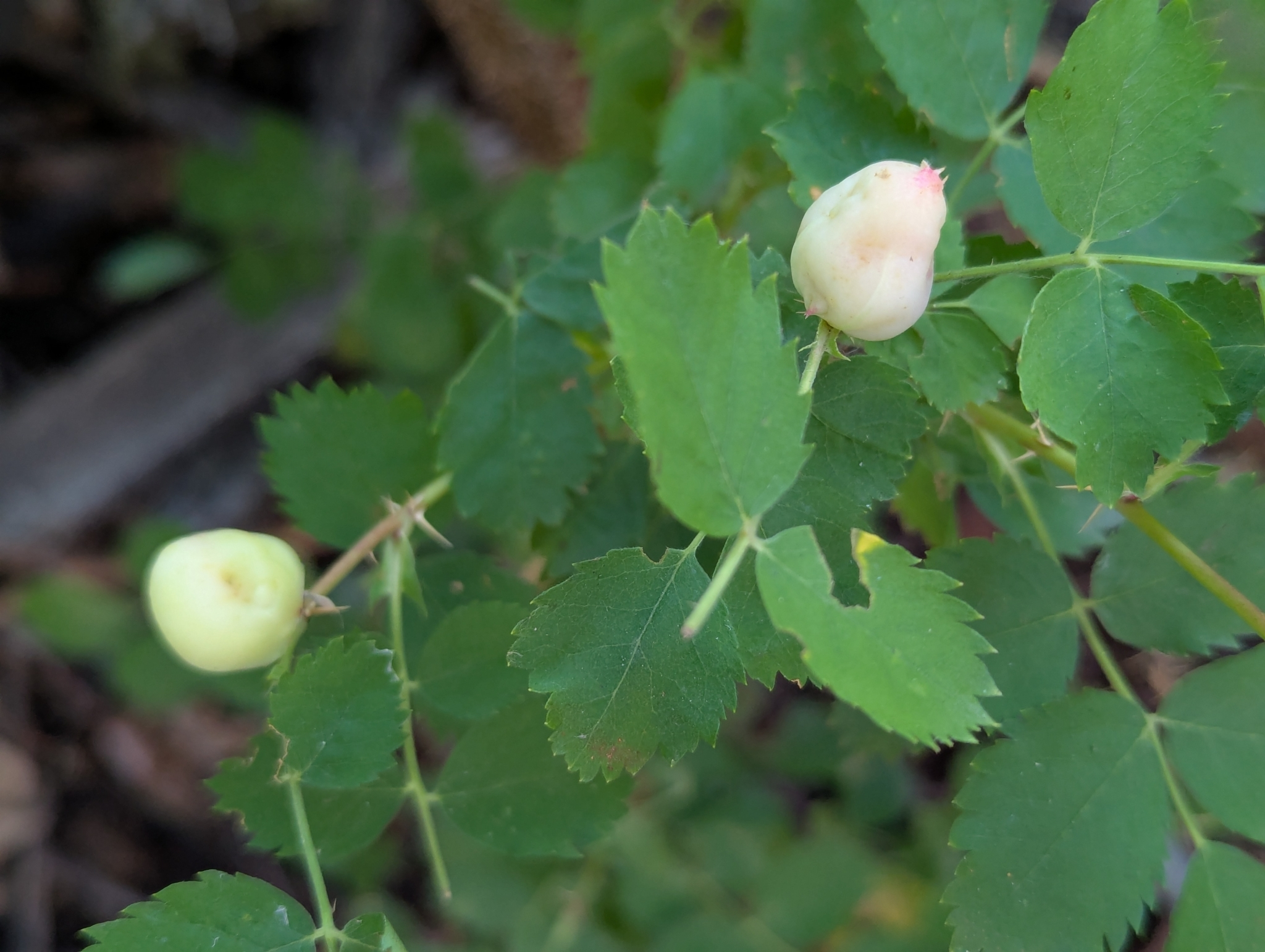
Periclistus in galls observed at Convict Lake, California

Periclistus is a genus of gall wasps in the tribe Diastrophini, formerly included in the tribe Synergini. There are at least 17 described species in Periclistus. Species from this genus are associated with host plants in the rose family, where in a phenomenon called agastoparasitism, they inquiline in the galls of at least four related species, Diastrophus, Diplolepis, Liebelia, and Xestophanes.

== Species ==
Species in the genus Periclistus include the following:

- Periclistus arefactus (McCracken & Egbert, 1922)
- Periclistus brandtii (Ratzeburg, 1832)
- Periclistus californicus (Ashmead, 1896)
- Periclistus caninae (Hartig, 1840)
- Periclistus capillatus (Belizin, 1968)
- Periclistus mongolicus (Belizin, 1973)
- Periclistus natalis (Taketani & Yasumatsu, 1973)
- Periclistus obliquus (Provancher, 1888)
- Periclistus orientalis (Pang, Liu & Zhu, 2020)
- Periclistus piceus (Fullaway, 1911)
- Periclistus pirata (Osten-Sacken, 1863)
- Periclistus qinghainensis (Pujade-Villar, Wang, Guo, Chen, 2016)
- Periclistus quinlani (Taketani & Yasumatsu, 1973)
- Periclistus semipiceus (Harris, 1841)
- Periclistus setosus (Wang, Liu & Chen, 2012)
- Periclistus smilacis (Ashmead, 1896)
- Periclistus spinosissimae (Dettmer, 1924)
- Periclistus yorikoae Abe & Ide, 2025
