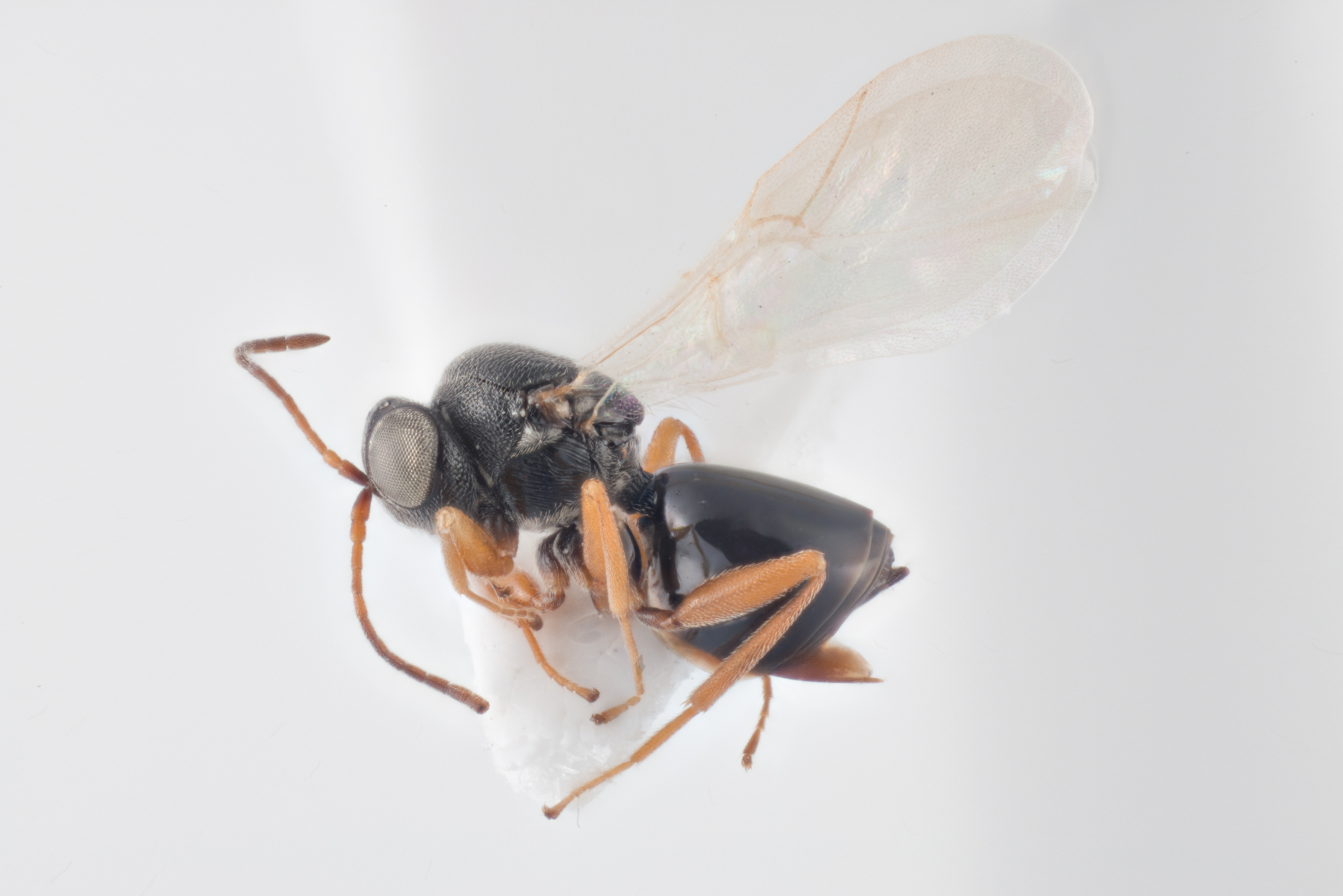
- Saphonecrus connatus

Scientific classification
- Kingdom: Animalia
- Phylum: Arthropoda
- Clade: Pancrustacea
- Class: Insecta
- Order: Hymenoptera
- Family: Cynipidae
- Subfamily: Cynipinae
- Tribe: Synergini

Genera
- See text

Diversity
- 69 species

= Synergini =

Tribe of wasps

Synergini is a tribe of gall wasps in the subfamily Cynipinae.

== Genera ==
The following genera are generally accepted within Synergini:

- Agastoroxenia
- Lithosaphonecrus
- Saphonecrus
- Rhoophilus
- Synergus
- Ufo

All of these except Lithosaphonecrus and Rhoophilus are found in the eastern Palearctic realm. Synergus has the greatest number of species in Synergini.

A reworking of the entire Cynipidae family published in 2015 transferred three genera formerly included in Synergini to other tribes - Ceroptres to a tribe of its own (Ceroptresini), and Periclistus and Synophromorpha to Diastrophini.

== Gall use ==
Members of Synergini have lost the ability to create their own galls, and instead make use of galls left behind by other wasps. As a result, they are classified as inquilines. Species in Synergini usually make use of galls made by wasps in tribe Cynipini.
