= Synergus japonicus =

Scientific classification
- Kingdom: Animalia
- Phylum: Arthropoda
- Class: Insecta
- Order: Hymenoptera
- Family: Cynipidae
- Genus: Synergus
- Species: S. japonicus

Binomial name
- Synergus japonicus Walker, 1874

Species of wasp

Synergus japonicus is a species of gall wasp in the family Cynipidae. Whereas most gall wasps create the galls in which they live, Synergus japonicus is an inquiline species, living in the gall created by another species of wasp. It is native to Japan, China and Russia.

== Distribution ==
Synergus japonicus was for a long time only known from Japan, but more recently it has been found in China, and also in eastern Russia where it was discovered living in the galls created by Andricus kashiwaphilus, on the Japanese emperor oak, Quercus dentata.

== Ecology ==
About 1,400 species of gall wasps have been described, and of these about 180 develop inside the galls created by other species. These inquilines can be considered as kleptoparasites because the shared gall is an arrangement that is only to the advantage of the inquiline. Gall wasps have complex life cycles, often with an alternation of generations with one sexual generation of both males and females alternating with an all-female, parthenogenetic generation. In the sexual generation, male Synergus japonicus seek out females, but do not distinguish between them on the basis of age or reproductive status. Instead, the males take part in certain courtship behaviours and only proceed to mate with a female if she adopts an acceptance posture. At this stage the female is receptive to the male, and continues in this state for a time, whether the pair copulate or not. Once the acceptance posture is discontinued, it is never adopted again, irrespective of whether the pair have mated.

In Japan, the burr-shaped galls of Andricus mukaigawae normally contain a single cell in which the larva of that gall wasp develops. However, larvae of Synergus japonicus are often also present in the gall, creating their own cells and consuming the gall tissues. The larvae of both species are often parasitised by chalcid wasps in the genus Torymus.
