= Cecinothofagus =

Catolaccus

Scientific classification
- Kingdom: Animalia
- Phylum: Arthropoda
- Class: Insecta
- Order: Hymenoptera
- Family: Cynipidae
- Subfamily: Cynipinae
- Genus: Cecinothofagus; Nieves-Aldrey & Liljeblad, 2009

Species
- Cecinothofagus gallaelenga (type species) (Nieves-Aldrey & Liljeblad, 2009); Cecinothofagus gallaecoihue (Nieves-Aldrey & Liljeblad, 2009); Cecinothofagus ibarrai (Nieves-Aldrey & Liljeblad, 2009)

Genus of wasps

Cecinothofagus is a genus of wasps. Its name is derived from cecidium and Nothofagus, the name of the host plant genus. This genus differs from Paraulax by a median vertical carina that extends from the ventral margin of the clypeus, almost reaching the ventral margin of the antennal sockets; its facial strigae radiating from the lateral clypeus; the ventral part of its clypeus is straight; a lateral, sharp occipital carina is present; its last antennal flagellomere is 1.5 to 1.7 times longer than wide; longitudinal costulae running from the lateral margin of its pronotal plate to the lateral surface of its pronotum are very short or absent altogether; notauli are sinuate; no scutellar foveae are present; simple claws, sometimes carrying a short basal lobe.

== Description ==
Its head is slightly pubescent, with some long, scattered setae on the upper frons, vertex and face. Its gena is not expanded behind its compound eye. A vertical median carina is present, while facial strigae that radiate from its clypeus extend laterally. Its clypeus has a straight ventral margin that does not project over its mandibles. It possesses a subocular impression, and 5 to 7 vertical carinae ventrolaterally on its gena. Anterior tentorial pits are visible; occiput without dorsal occipital carina.

The female antenna is composed of 12 segments, its flagellum broadening towards its apex. The last flagellomere is broader than the penultimate, with a rounded end. The male antenna possesses 15 segments, with a flagellum that does not broaden towards the apex. Its pronotum's dorsal part is distinctly set off; admedian pronotal depressions are widely separated. The lateral surface of the pronotum is coriaceous. The mesoscutum is almost wholly smooth. Some long setae are scattered along the notauli, which are percurrent and well separated posteriorly. Anteroadmedian signa is visible, and the transscutal fissure is narrow. The mesopleuron is located beneath the mesopleural triangle and carries a marked, longitudinal impression.

Its metapleural sulcus meets the posterior margin of the mesopectus at mid height of the metapectal-propodeal complex. Nucha exhibit some irregular longitudinal rugae dorsally. Its profemur shows ventral swelling in its basal third, with 4–5 rows of sharp. It possesses a simple metatarsal claw. It presents a radial cell along the anterior margin of its forewing; an areolet is absent. There is a fringe of long setae along the apical margin of its wing. Its abdominal petiole is dorsally smooth, with deep, longitudinal grooves ventrally.

== Distribution ==
This genus of fly can be found in Chile and Argentina, following the distribution of the host plants, Nothofagus dombeyi and Nothofagus pumilio.

== Behaviour ==
The three species of Cecinothofagus inhabit galls induced by Aditrochus species on Nothofagus. Cecinothofagus species are thought not to be the gall inducers but rather parasitoids of the Aditrochus larvae. The adult Cecinothofagus is observed to emerge from the solitary central host cell.
