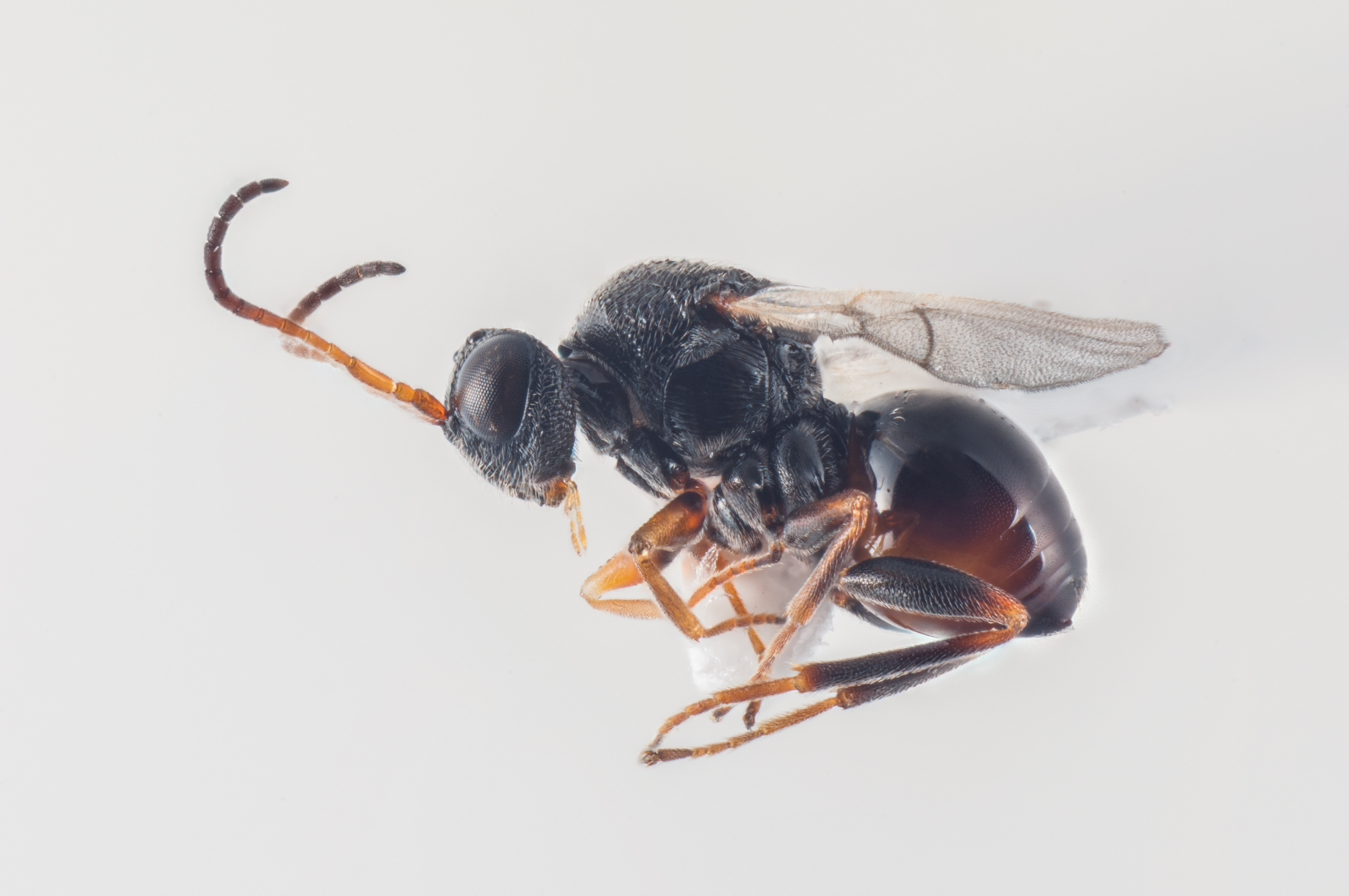
- Synergus clandestinus

Scientific classification
- Kingdom: Animalia
- Phylum: Arthropoda
- Class: Insecta
- Order: Hymenoptera
- Family: Cynipidae
- Subfamily: Cynipinae
- Tribe: Synergini
- Genus: Synergus; Hartig, 1840

= Synergus =

Genus of wasps

Synergus is a genus of gall wasp in the tribe Synergini. It is found worldwide. Species in Synergus are generally inquilines, which means they use the galls of other species of gall wasps. Synergus uses the galls of Cynipini on oak trees.

== Species ==
As of 2024, there are at least 127 species in Synergus. Notable species include:

- Synergus itoensis
  - Only Synergus species known to induce its own gall.
- Synergus japonicus
- Synergus vulgaris Hartig, 1840
  - The type species for Synergus
