= Ufo abei =

Scientific classification
- Kingdom: Animalia
- Phylum: Arthropoda
- Class: Insecta
- Order: Hymenoptera
- Family: Cynipidae
- Genus: Ufo
- Species: U. abei

Binomial name
- Ufo abei Melika & Pujade-Villar, 2005

Species of wasp

Ufo abei is a species of gall wasp in the genus Ufo. It was first discovered in Japan and is inquiline on oak galls produced by other cynipid wasps. It is the type species of its genus.
