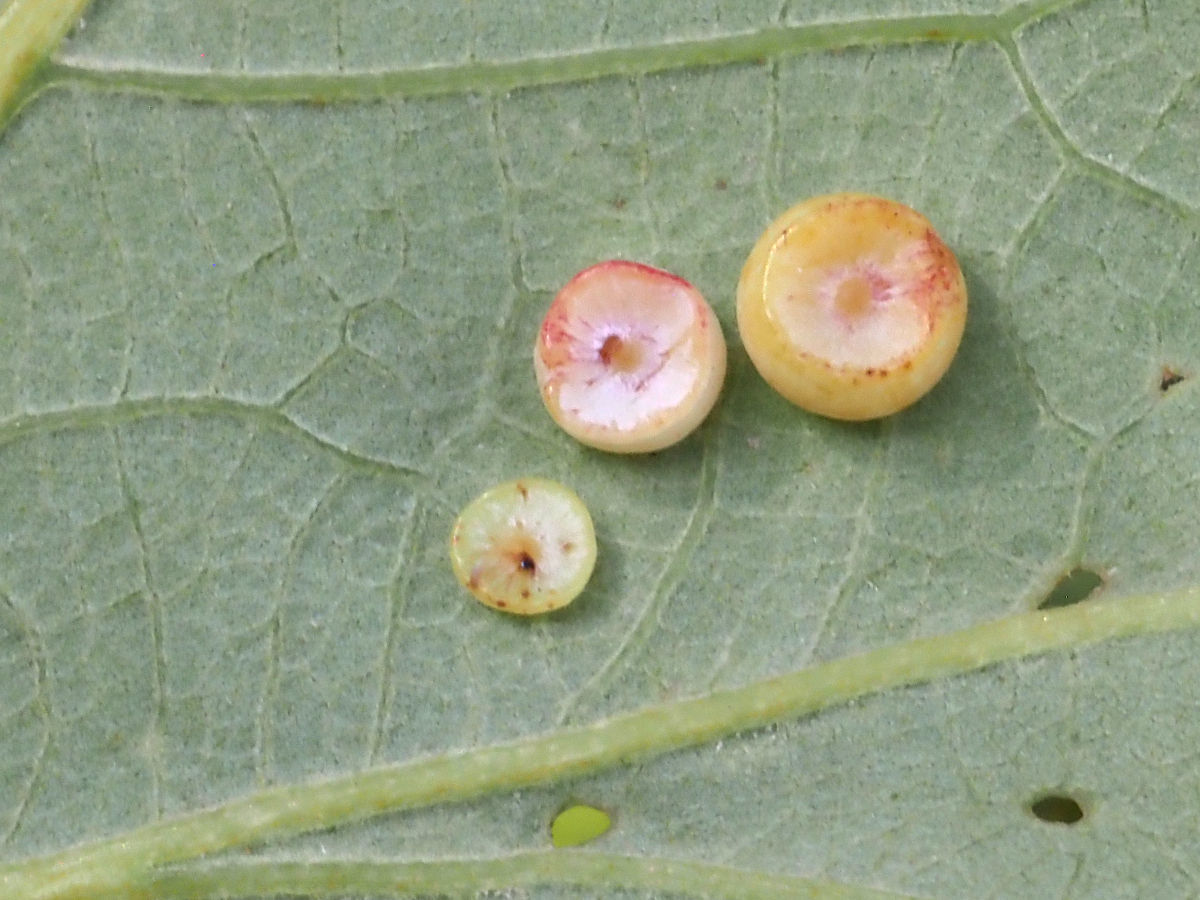
- Galls on bur oak (Quercus macrocarpa)
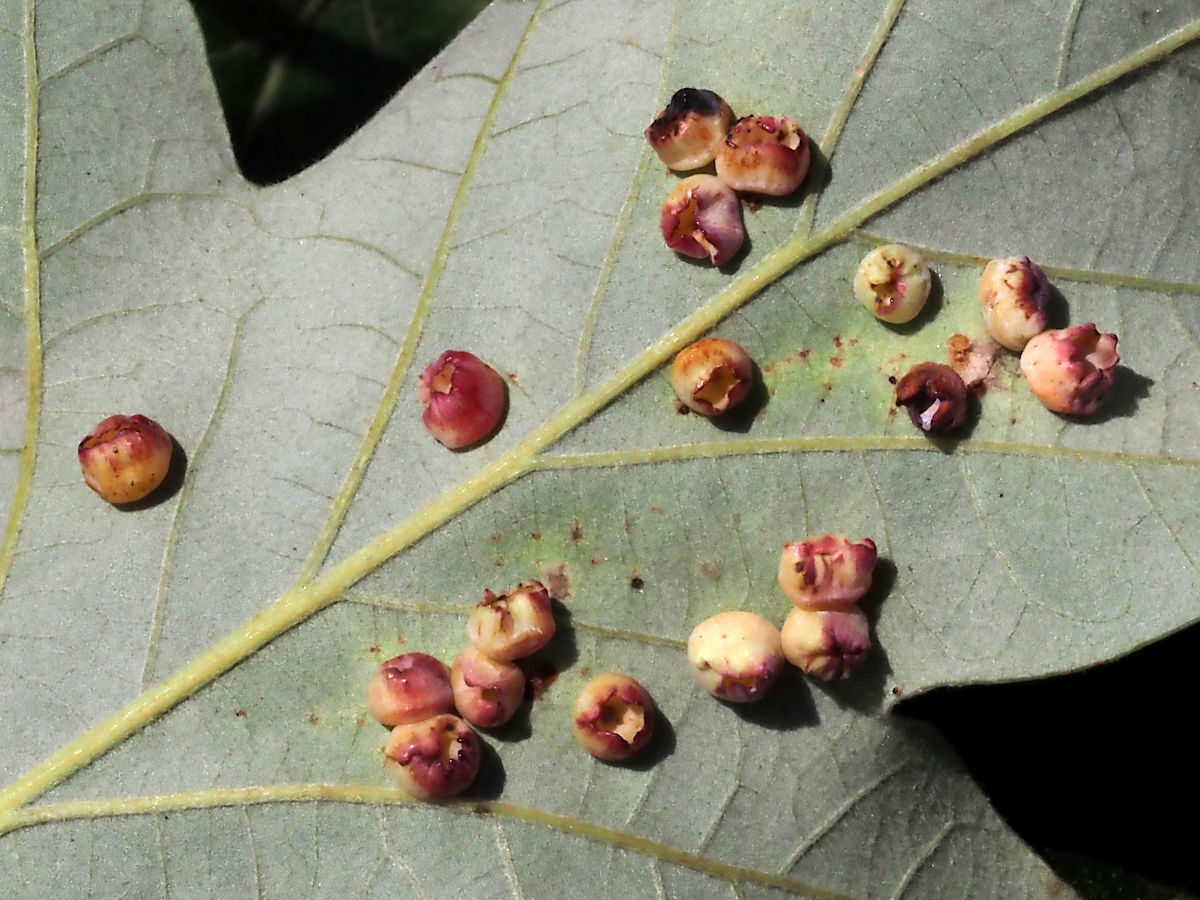
- Galls on swamp white oak (Quercus bicolor)

Scientific classification
- Kingdom: Animalia
- Phylum: Arthropoda
- Clade: Pancrustacea
- Class: Insecta
- Order: Hymenoptera
- Family: Cynipidae
- Genus: Phylloteras
- Species: P. volutellae

Binomial name
- Phylloteras volutellae Ashmead, 1897

Synonyms
- Xystoteras volutellae

= Phylloteras volutellae =

Species of wasp

Phylloteras volutellae, the conical oak gall wasp, is a species of gall wasp (family Cynipidae), tribe Cynipini (oak gall wasps), found in North America.

Larvae induce galls on the leaves of white oaks, including bur oak (Quecus macrocarpa) and swamp white oak (Quercus bicolor).

== Description ==
Each gall contains a single larva and is formed on the underside of host leaves, often in clusters. The detachable gall is conical in shape and concave at the top.

The adult emerges from the gall in early January, but is otherwise undescribed.

== Ecology ==
Inquiline species found in the galls include Synergus walshii Gillette, 1896 (Cynipidae).
