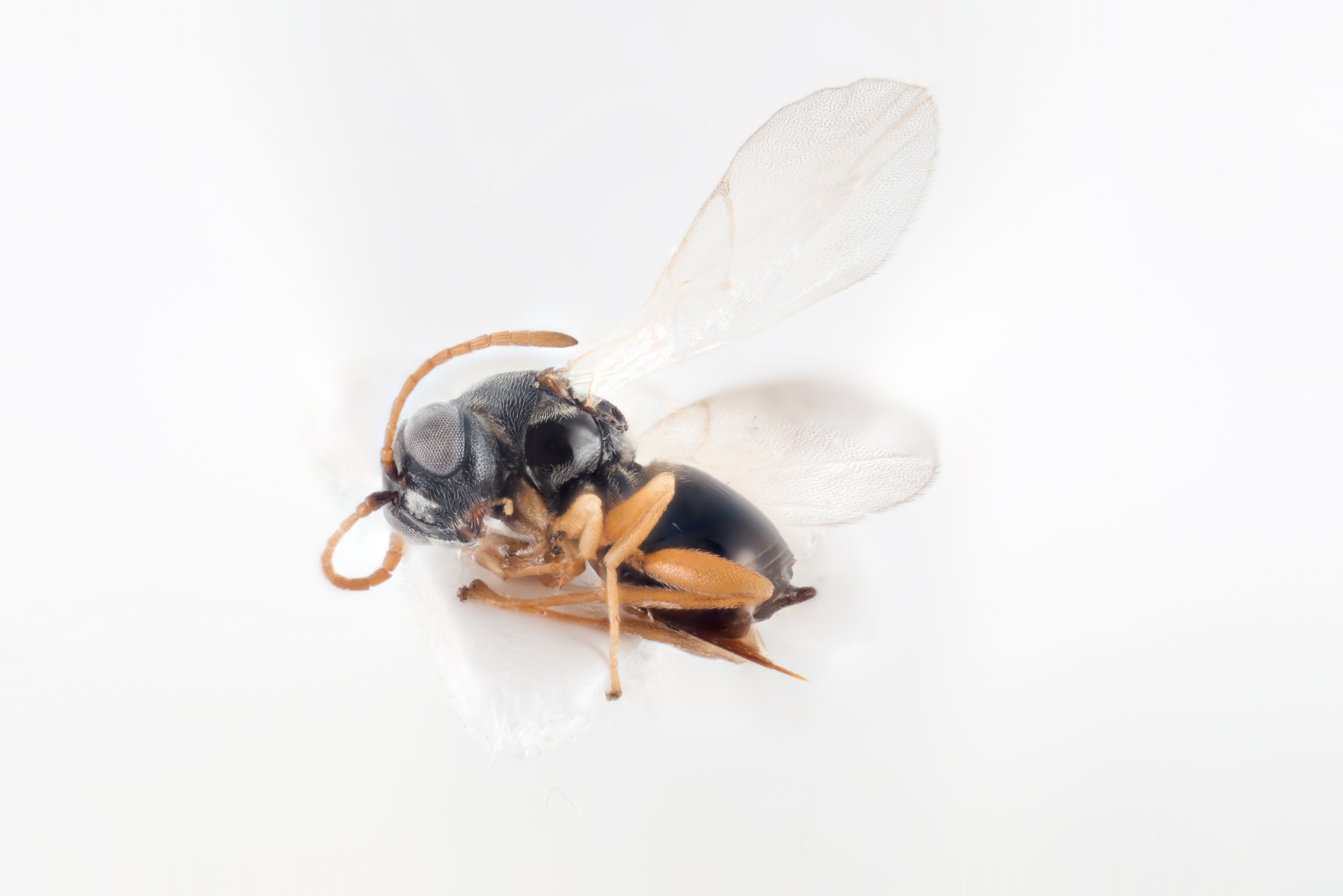
- Ceroptres clavicornis

Scientific classification
- Kingdom: Animalia
- Phylum: Arthropoda
- Class: Insecta
- Order: Hymenoptera
- Family: Cynipidae
- Subfamily: Cynipinae
- Tribe: Ceroptresini
- Genus: Ceroptres; Hartig, 1840

= Ceroptres =

Genus of insects

Ceroptres is a genus of gall wasp. Most of its species are found in North America, and most are inquilines, meaning it oviposits its eggs in a host gall. These host galls are mostly induced by other gall wasps, but some species of Ceroptres use the galls of gall midges.

== Species ==
Ceroptres contains at least 43 species, including:

- Ceroptres anansii Nastasi, Smith, & Davis, 2024
  - Named for Anansi
- Ceroptres anzui Nastasi, Smith, & Davis, 2024
  - Named for Anzû
- Ceroptres bruti Nastasi, Smith, & Davis, 2024
  - Named for Brutus
- Ceroptres catesbaei Ashmead, 1885
- Ceroptres clavicornis Hartig, 1840
- Ceroptres confertus (McCracken & Egbert, 1922)
- Ceroptres cornigera Melika & Buss, 2002
- Ceroptres curupira Nastasi, Smith, & Davis, 2024
  - Named for Curupira
- Ceroptres daleki Nastasi, Smith, & Davis, 2024
  - Named for daleks from Doctor Who
- Ceroptres dandoi Nastasi, Smith, & Davis, 2024
  - Named for Edward Dando
- Ceroptres demerzelae Nastasi, Smith, & Davis, 2024
  - Named for Demerzel
- Ceroptres ensiger (Walsh, 1864)
- Ceroptres frondosae Ashmead, 1896
- Ceroptres iktomii Nastasi, Smith, & Davis, 2024
  - Named for Iktomi
- Ceroptres jabbai Nastasi, Smith, & Davis, 2024
  - Named for Jabba the Hutt from Star Wars
- Ceroptres jarethi Nastasi, Smith, & Davis, 2024
  - Named for Jareth from Labyrinth
- Ceroptres junquerasi Lobato-Vila & Pujade-Villar, 2019
- Ceroptres lanigerae Ashmead, 1885
- Ceroptres lenis Lobato-Vila & Pujade-Villar, 2019
- Ceroptres lokii Nastasi, Smith, & Davis, 2024
  - Named for Loki
- Ceroptres lupini Nastasi, Smith, & Davis, 2024
  - Named for Arsène Lupin
- Ceroptres mallowi Nastasi, Smith, & Davis, 2024
  - Named for Hober Mallow
- Ceroptres mexicanus Lobato-Vila & Pujade-Villar, 2019
- Ceroptres minutissimi Ashmead, 1885
- Ceroptres montensis Weld, 1957
- Ceroptres nigricrus Lobato-Vila & Pujade-Villar, 2019
- Ceroptres petiolicola (Osten Sacken, 1861)
- Ceroptres pisum (Osten Sacken, 1861)
- Ceroptres promethei Nastasi, Smith, & Davis, 2024
  - Named for Prometheus
- Ceroptres quadratifacies Lobato-Vila & Pujade-Villar, 2019
- Ceroptres rufiventris Ashmead, 1896
- Ceroptres sandiegoae Nastasi, Smith, & Davis, 2024
  - Named for Carmen Sandiego
- Ceroptres selinae Nastasi, Smith, & Davis, 2024
  - Named for Selina Kyle
- Ceroptres snellingi Lyon, 1996
- Ceroptres soloi Nastasi, Smith, & Davis, 2024
  - Named for Han Solo
- Ceroptres songae Nastasi, Smith, & Davis, 2024
  - Named for River Song
- Ceroptres swiperi Nastasi, Smith, & Davis, 2024
  - Named for Swiper from Dora the Explorer
- Ceroptres thrymi Nastasi, Smith, & Davis, 2024
  - Named for Thrym
- Ceroptres tikoloshei Nastasi, Smith, & Davis, 2024
  - Named for Tikoloshe
- Ceroptres zorroi Nastasi, Smith, & Davis, 2024
  - Named for Zorro
