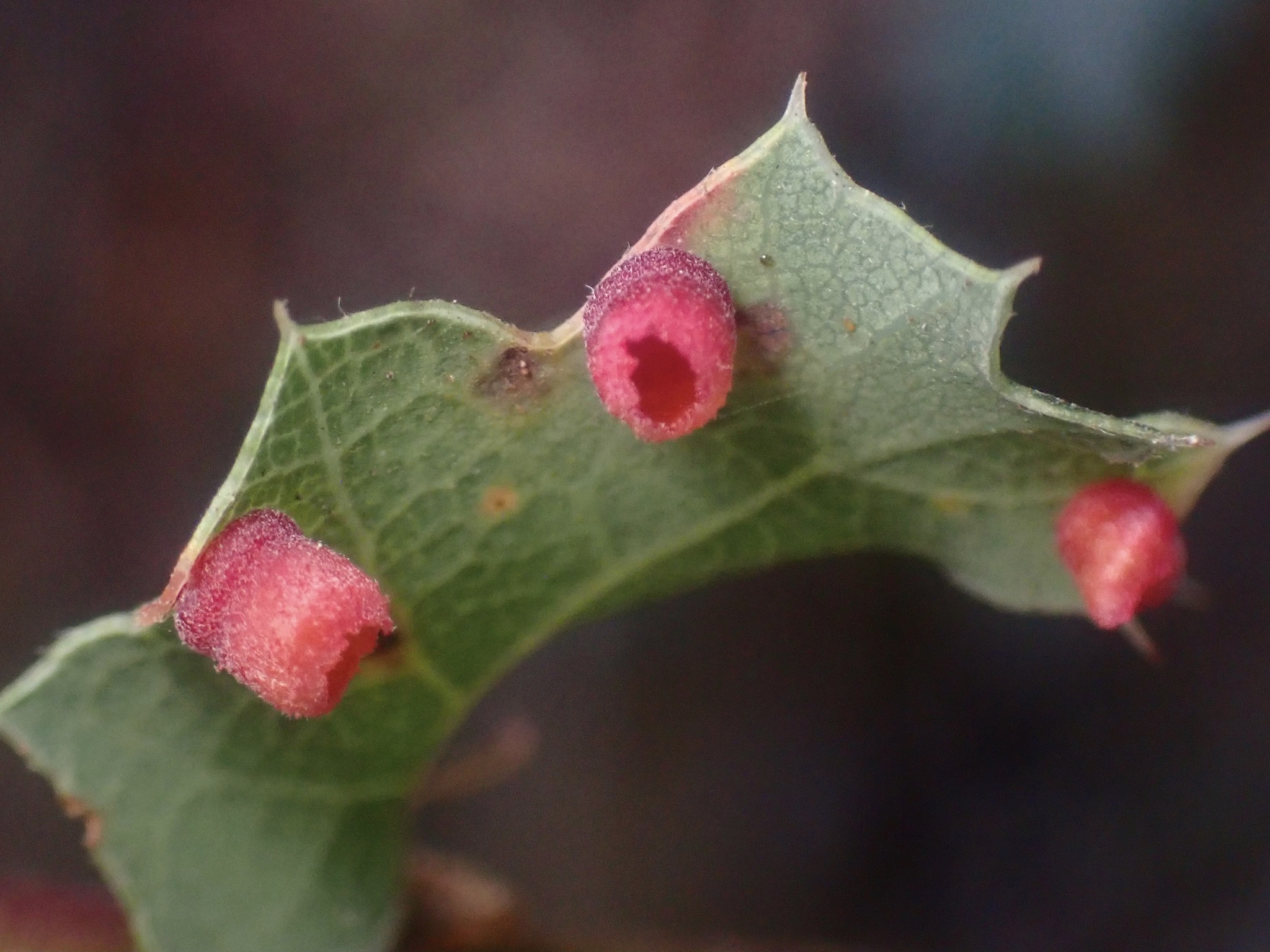
- Santa Clara County, California, 2021

Scientific classification
- Kingdom: Animalia
- Phylum: Arthropoda
- Class: Insecta
- Order: Hymenoptera
- Family: Cynipidae
- Subfamily: Cynipinae
- Tribe: Cynipini
- Genus: Phylloteras
- Species: P. cupella

Binomial name
- Phylloteras cupella (Weld, 1926)

Synonyms
- Trigonaspis cupella

= Phylloteras cupella =

North American gall-inducing wasp

Phylloteras cupella, formerly Trigonaspis cupella, also known as the urn gall wasp or the banded urn gall wasp, is a species of cynipid wasp that induces leaf galls on a number of oak species in western North America. Host species include Arizona white, blue, Engelmann, gray, leather, netleaf, scrub, and shrub oaks. In the United States, galls induced by this species of wasp have been documented in California, Arizona, and New Mexico. This wasp is most likely also in Mexico and Canada.

The galls usually have an ombré gradient: lighter at the top, and darker toward the bottom. New galls may be yellow, red, or mauve, while aging galls display a distinctly purple tint, and old galls ultimately turn brown.

The wasp measures 1.3–2 millimeters in length.
