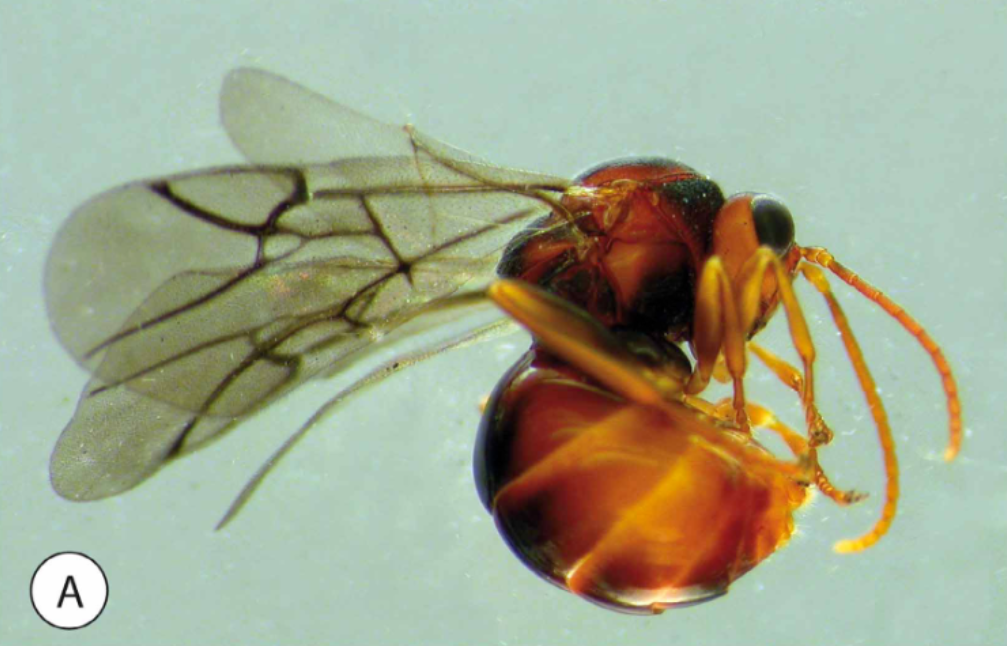
- Qwaqwaia scolopiae adult female
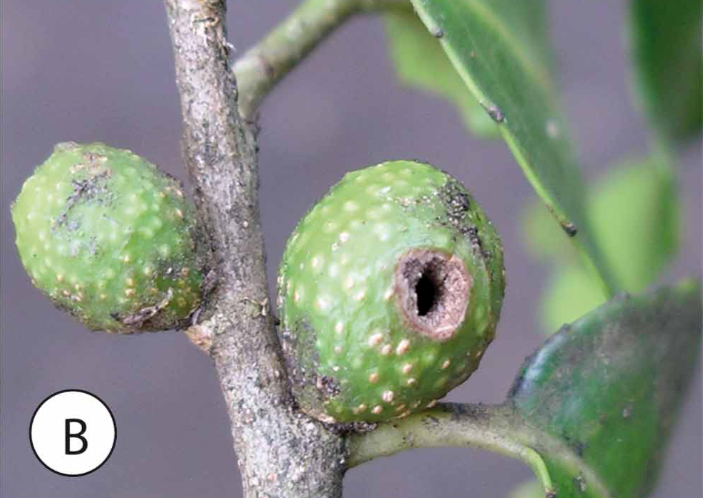
- Galls on Scolopia mundii

Scientific classification
- Domain: Eukaryota
- Kingdom: Animalia
- Phylum: Arthropoda
- Class: Insecta
- Order: Hymenoptera
- Family: Cynipidae
- Subfamily: Cynipinae
- Tribe: Qwaqwaiini; Liljeblad, Nieves-Aldrey & Melika, 2011
- Genus: Qwaqwaia; Liljeblad, Nieves-Aldrey & Melika, 2011
- Species: Q. scolopiae

Binomial name
- Qwaqwaia scolopiae Liljeblad, Nieves-Aldrey & Melika, 2011

= Qwaqwaia =

Species of wasp

Qwaqwaia scolopiae is a species of wasp in the family Cynipidae, found in South Africa. It is placed in the monotypic genus Qwaqwaia and tribe Qwaqwaiini. It forms stem galls on Scolopia mundii, a plant in the family Salicaceae, and has only been found at three locations along the Drakensberg escarpment.

== Etymology ==
The genus name Qwaqwaia derives from the former Bantustan QwaQwa, where Qwaqwaia scolopiae was first collected. The specific epithet scolopiae is derived from the plant genus Scolopia, one species of which is the host plant of the wasp.

== Description ==
Qwaqwaia scolopiae is currently the only known member of the tribe Qwaqwaiini, which can be distinguished from other tribes in the family Cynipidae by the following features: right mandible with two teeth, ventral margin of the clypeus straight, parascutal carina extending to notaulus, mesopleuron medially with longitudinal striae, tarsal claws simple, radial cell closed, third abdominal tergum short and covering only about one third of the abdomen, and hypopygium without a visibly extended spine and with a dense tuft of hair.

Qwaqwaia scolopiae is 4.2-4.4 mm in length and dark brown in color with lighter legs. The main part of the thorax is hairy, but the rest of the body is relatively hairless. Due to the species possessing a dorsally wide pronotum, it can most easily be confused with species in the tribes Synergini and Aylacini. However, it differs from these wasps by possessing two teeth on the right mandible and parascutal carina that extend anteriorly to the notauli.

== Biology ==
Qwaqwaia scolopiae forms galls on Scolopia mundii. The galls are round, about 6-10 mm in diameter, and are found on shoot tips and leaf axils. Most galls possess one cavity containing a single wasp larva, although larger galls can have two or three cavities. Newly developed galls are soft, smooth and shiny green. As they age, the galls become more woody, darker in color and develop a granular surface. Adult females have been recorded emerging from the galls in October and November. Additionally, Qwaqwaia scolopiae appears to be naturally rare, only infecting a small portion of the Scolopia mundii population where the wasp occurs.

Phylogenetic analyses indicate the Qwaqwaiini is a sister tribe to the Rhoophilini, another Afrotropical tribe within the Cynipidae.
