= Ufo (wasp) =

Scientific classification
- Kingdom: Animalia
- Phylum: Arthropoda
- Class: Insecta
- Order: Hymenoptera
- Family: Cynipidae
- Tribe: Synergini
- Genus: Ufo; Melika & Pujade-Villar, 2005

Type species
- Ufo abei Melika & Pujade-Villar, 2005

Species
- See text

Genus of wasps

Ufo is a genus of gall wasps in the tribe Synergini, first discovered in Japan. Its genus name Ufo comes from the common phrase "unidentified flying object", in this case applied because the researchers did not know what the wasp was when they first saw it.

== Species ==
Four species are currently classified within Ufo.

- U. abei (type species) Melika & Pujade-Villar, 2005
- U. cerroneuroteri Tang & Melika, 2012
- U. koreanus Melika, Pujade-Villar & Choi, 2007
- U. nipponicus Melika, 2012

Saphonecrus shirakashii and S. shirokashicola were formerly placed in Ufo, but further research indicated they were better placed in Saphonecrus.
