= Cecinothofagus gallaecoihue =

Scientific classification
- Kingdom: Animalia
- Phylum: Arthropoda
- Class: Insecta
- Order: Hymenoptera
- Family: Cynipidae
- Genus: Cecinothofagus
- Species: C. gallaecoihue

Binomial name
- Cecinothofagus gallaecoihue Nieves-Aldrey et al., 2009

Species of wasp

Cecinothofagus gallaecoihue is a species of gall wasp. Cecinothofagus species are thought to be parasitoids or lethal inhabitants of galls induced by species of Aditrochus on Nothofagus.
