= Rhoophilus =

Scientific classification
- Kingdom: Animalia
- Phylum: Arthropoda
- Clade: Pancrustacea
- Class: Insecta
- Order: Hymenoptera
- Family: Cynipidae
- Tribe: Synergini
- Genus: Rhoophilus; Mayr, 1881

Type species
- Rhoophilus loewi Mayr, 1881

Species
- 1

Genus of wasps

Rhoophilus is a genus of gall wasp including one species, endemic to South Africa.

== Species ==
- Rhoophilus loewi Mayr, 1881
