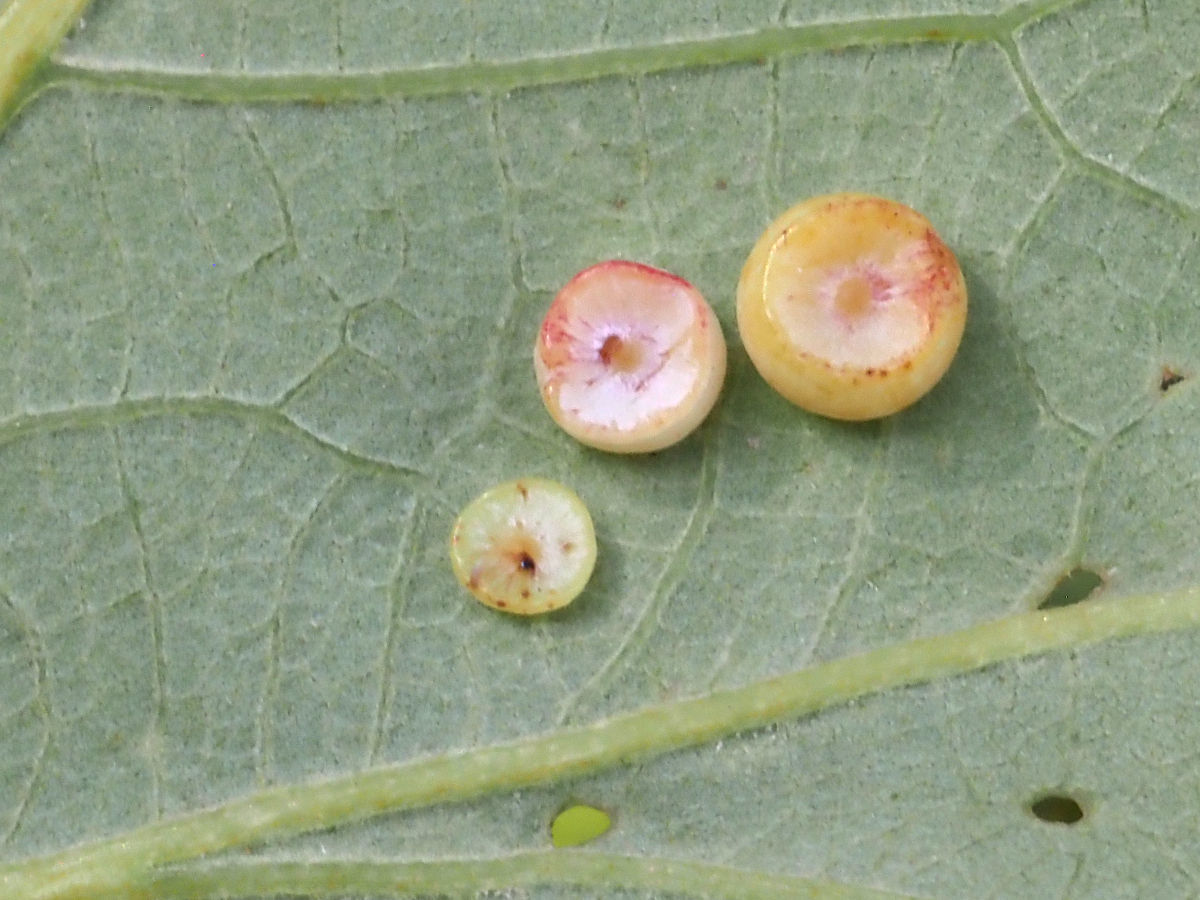
- P. volutellae galls on bur oak

Scientific classification
- Kingdom: Animalia
- Phylum: Arthropoda
- Clade: Pancrustacea
- Class: Insecta
- Order: Hymenoptera
- Family: Cynipidae
- Tribe: Cynipini
- Genus: Phylloteras; Ashmead, 1897

Synonyms
- Xystoteras

= Phylloteras =

Genus of wasps

Phylloteras is a North American genus of gall wasps in the family Cynipidae, tribe Cynipini (oak gall wasps).

== Species ==
There are at least 4 described species in Phylloteras, possibly 11 total.

- Phylloteras cupella (Weld)—urn gall wasp
- Phylloteras poculum (Osten-Sacken, 1862)
- Phylloteras sigma (Weld)
- Phylloteras volutellae Ashmead, 1897—conical oak gall wasp
