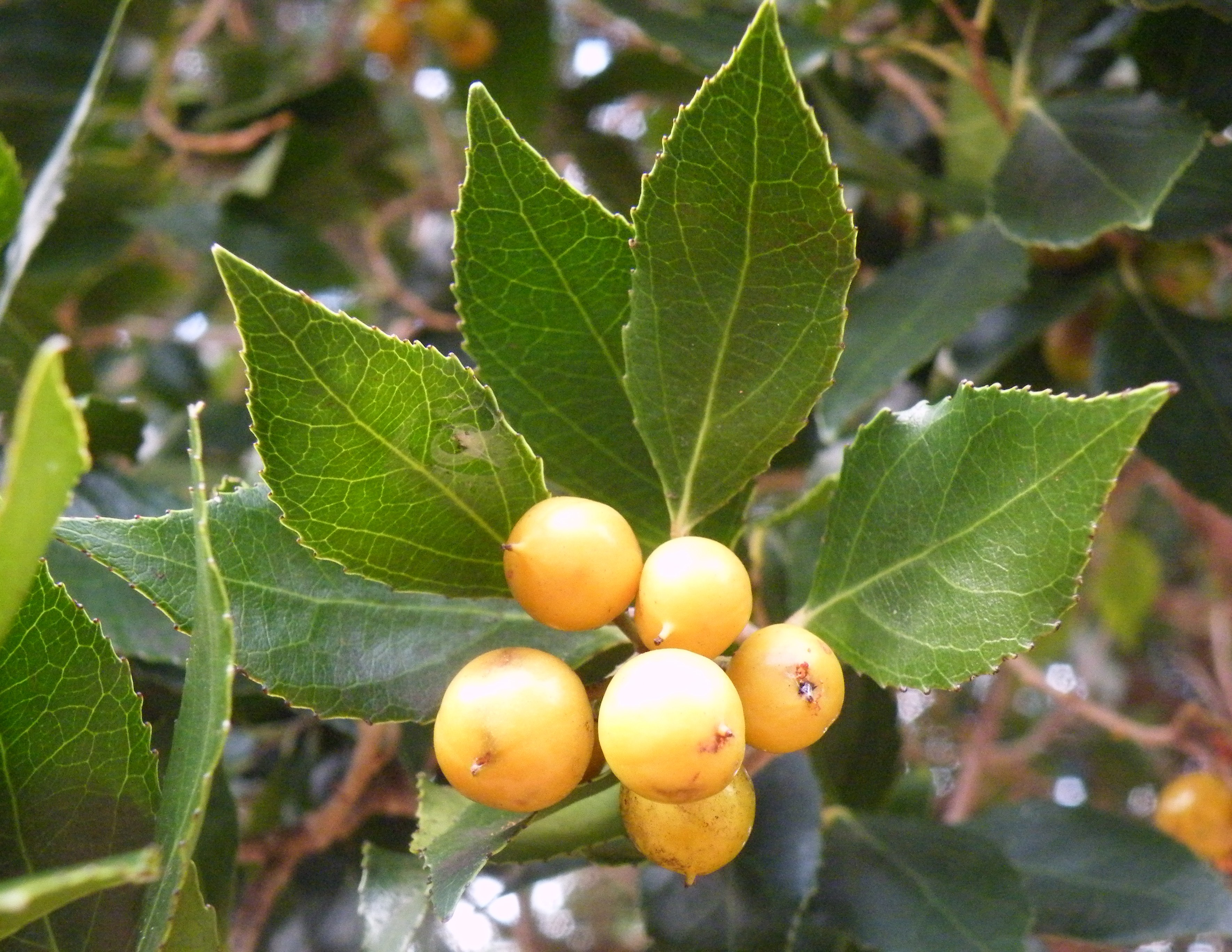
- Detail of the leaves and berries of Scolopia mundii.

Conservation status
- Least Concern (IUCN 3.1)

Scientific classification
- Kingdom: Plantae
- Clade: Tracheophytes
- Clade: Angiosperms
- Clade: Eudicots
- Clade: Rosids
- Order: Malpighiales
- Family: Salicaceae
- Genus: Scolopia
- Species: S. mundii

Binomial name
- Scolopia mundii (Ecklon & Zeyher) Warb.

Synonyms
- List: Eriudaphus mundii (Ecklon & Zeyher) Warb.; Eriudaphus serratus Harv.; Phoberos mundii (Nees) Arn.; Adenogyrus krebsii Klotzsch; Eriudaphus closianus Baill.; Rhamnicastrum mundii (Nees) Kuntze; Scolopia closiana (Baill.) Warb.

= Scolopia mundii =

Species of tree

Scolopia mundii, the red pear or mountain saffron, is a tree in the family Salicaceae found in Eswatini, Lesotho, South Africa and Zimbabwe. It has dark green foliage and bright yellow or orange berries. A very adaptable species, it can be found in forests, forest edges and mountain slopes from 30-2200m in elevation. While it is not considered threatened over its entire range, it is rare and considered Critically Endangered (CR) in Zimbabwe.

== Taxonomy ==
There has been confusion over the correct authorship citation for Scolopia mundii. The species was originally described as Eriudaphus mundii in Enumeratio plantae africae australis extra-tropicae written by Christian Friedrich Ecklon and Karl Ludwig Philipp Zeyher in 1836. Two other species in the now-invalid genus Eriudaphus were described in the book, both with Christian Gottfried Daniel Nees von Esenbeck attributed as the species author. However, Eriudaphus mundii did not specify any species author in its description. This confusion led to some botanists regarding Christian Nees von Esenbeck as the correct author, including in the taxonomic revision which transferred the species to the genus Scolopia. It was later suggested in 1974 by the botanist Donald Killick that since Ecklon and Zeyher had otherwise very consistently attributed authorship to each species in their book, the lack of an authorship for Eriudaphus mundii most likely meant they inserted the description in the book themselves. Thus, the correct authorship citation should be (Ecklon & Zeyher) Warb.

== Description ==
Scolopia mundii is a tree or shrub with glossy, dark green leaves and yellow to orange fruits. It has two growth forms, one under forest conditions and one under more open conditions. The forest form is a medium to tall tree 10-35m in height, with a spreading crown and generally fluted trunk. The form found in more open conditions is a shrub to small tree 3-10m in height, with a more compact, dense crown.

The leaves are serrated, simple, glabrous and leathery, with an alternating arrangement. They are ovate in shape, tapering abruptly at the apex and rounded at the base. There are 4-6 lateral pairs of leaf veins, which curve upwards without reaching the leaf margin and are visible on the upper and lower surfaces of the leaf. Leaves range from 20-80mm in length and 20-50mm in width, and the pink to red petioles are 3-10mm in length.

The flowers are small and green-white, with dense axillary racemes 20-30 mm in length. The flowers themselves are bisexual and 4-8 mm in width. The fruit are smooth and globose, up to 13 mm in diameter. Each fruit contains 1-2 seeds and becomes yellow to orange when ripe.

== Biology ==
Scolopia mundii is found across South Africa, Lesotho, Eswatini and sporadically in eastern Zimbabwe in forests, forest margins and grassy mountain slopes between the altitudes of 30-2200m. They are a significant species in some forest areas in the region and have been used in conjunction with other species to define certain vegetation types. The tree flowers from May to August, and fruits from October to January. Once fruits are ripe, they fall from the tree and are commonly eaten and spread by birds.

The gall wasp Qwaqwaia scolopiae forms galls on Scolopia mundii.
