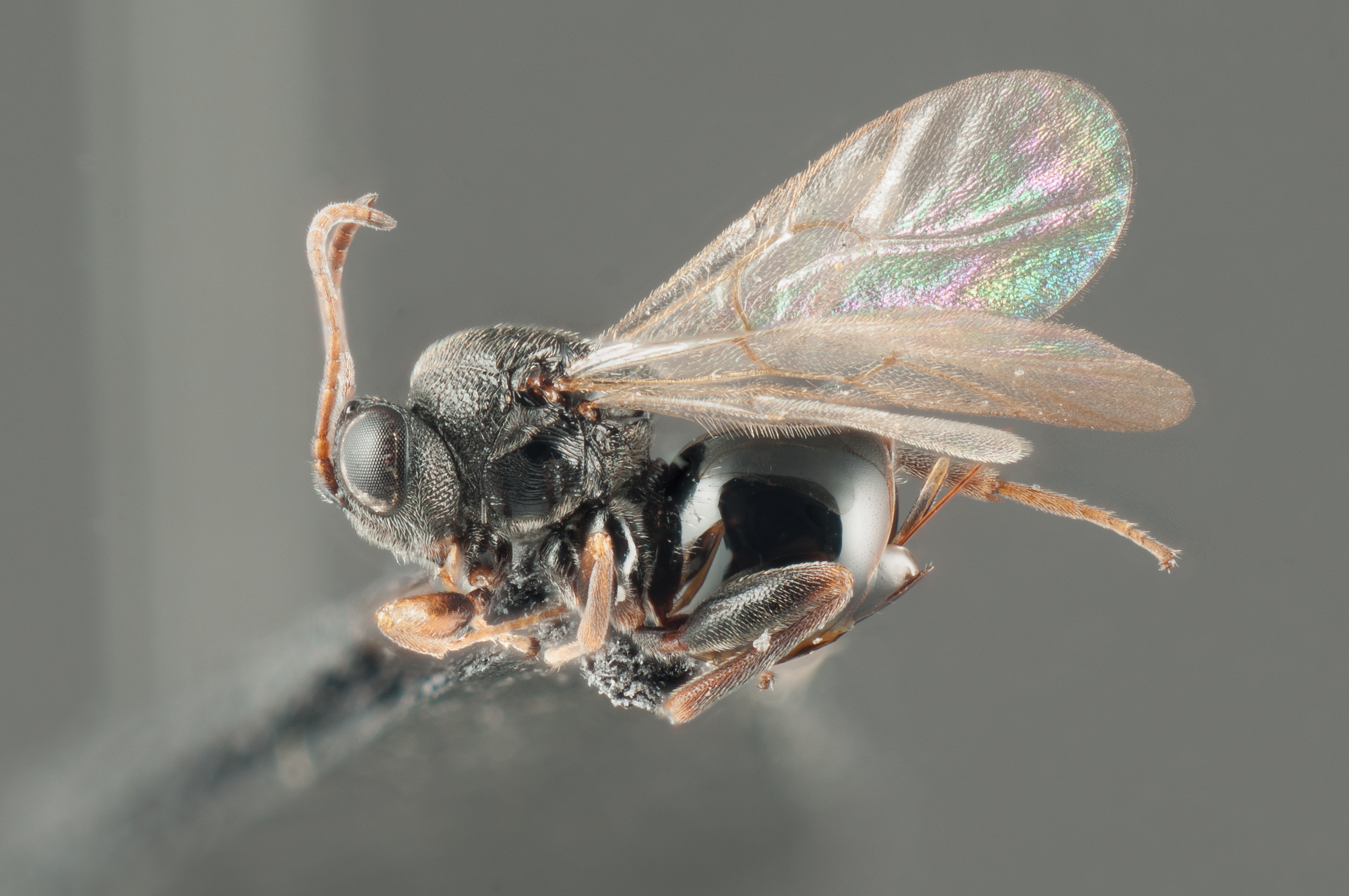
- A male Periclistus brandtii

Scientific classification
- Kingdom: Animalia
- Phylum: Arthropoda
- Class: Insecta
- Order: Hymenoptera
- Family: Cynipidae
- Subfamily: Cynipinae
- Tribe: Diastrophini

Genera
- Diastrophus; Periclistus; Synophromorpha; Xestophanes; Xestophanopsis

Diversity
- 25 species

= Diastrophini =

Tribe of wasps

Diastrophini is a tribe of gall wasps in the subfamily Cynipinae. It was established in 2015 by Fredrik Ronquist et al. Species in this tribe are associated with host plants in the rose family.

== Genera ==
The following genera are generally accepted within Diastrophini:

- Diastrophus
- Periclistus
- Synophromorpha
- Xestophanes
- Xestophanopsis

The genera Diastrophus and Xestophanes are gall-inducers, while the genera Perclistus and Synophromorpha are inquillines, making use of galls left behind by other wasps. Xestophanes induces galls on Potentilla, while Synophromorpha inquilines in Diastrophus galls on Rubus bushes.

Diastrophini genera are distributed throughout the holarctic realm, with some species transgressing into the neotropical.
