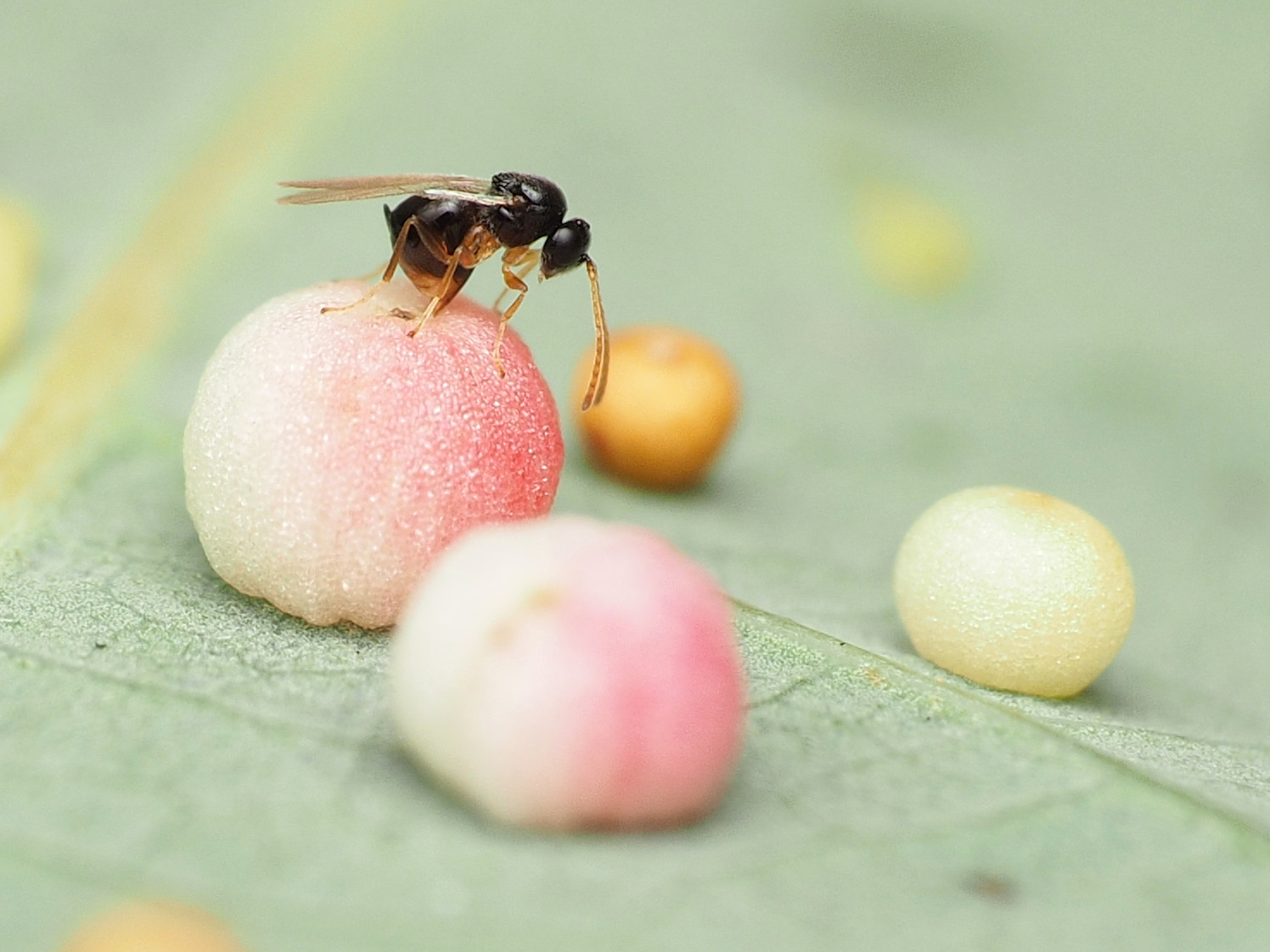

Scientific classification
- Kingdom: Animalia
- Phylum: Arthropoda
- Clade: Pancrustacea
- Class: Insecta
- Order: Hymenoptera
- Family: Cynipidae
- Subfamily: Cynipinae
- Tribe: Ceroptresini; Nieves-Aldrey, Nylander & Ronquist, 2015

= Ceroptresini =

Tribe of insects

Ceroptresini is a tribe of oak gall wasps in the family Cynipidae, and includes two genera: Ceroptres and Buffingtonella. All but one of the 44 species currently recognized are in Ceroptres. Ceroptresini, containing only Ceroptres, was first proposed as a tribe in 2015, and Buffingtonella was included the tribe in 2019 when the genus was first described. Most known species in this tribe are inquilines in galls induced by other gall wasps, but some have been reared from gall midge galls.
