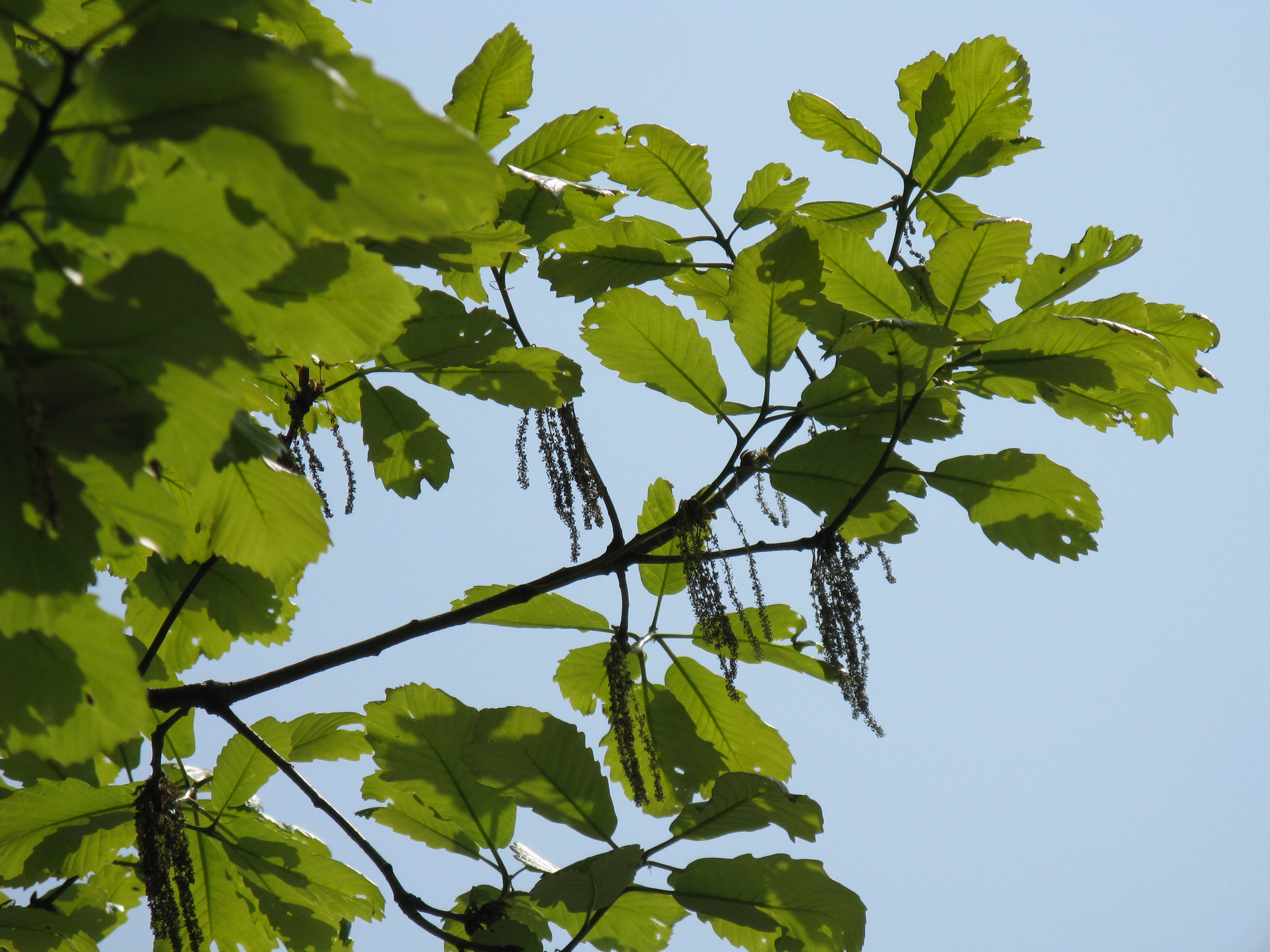
- Leaves and pollen catkins. Osaka, Japan.

Conservation status
- Least Concern (IUCN 3.1)

Scientific classification
- Kingdom: Plantae
- Clade: Embryophytes
- Clade: Tracheophytes
- Clade: Spermatophytes
- Clade: Angiosperms
- Clade: Eudicots
- Clade: Rosids
- Order: Fagales
- Family: Fagaceae
- Genus: Quercus
- Subgenus: Quercus subg. Quercus
- Section: Quercus sect. Quercus
- Species: Q. aliena

Binomial name
- Quercus aliena Blume

= Quercus aliena =

Species of oak tree

Quercus aliena, the galcham oak or oriental white oak, is a species of oak in the family Fagaceae, in the white oak section Quercus. It is a tree native to eastern and Southeast Asia.

== Description ==
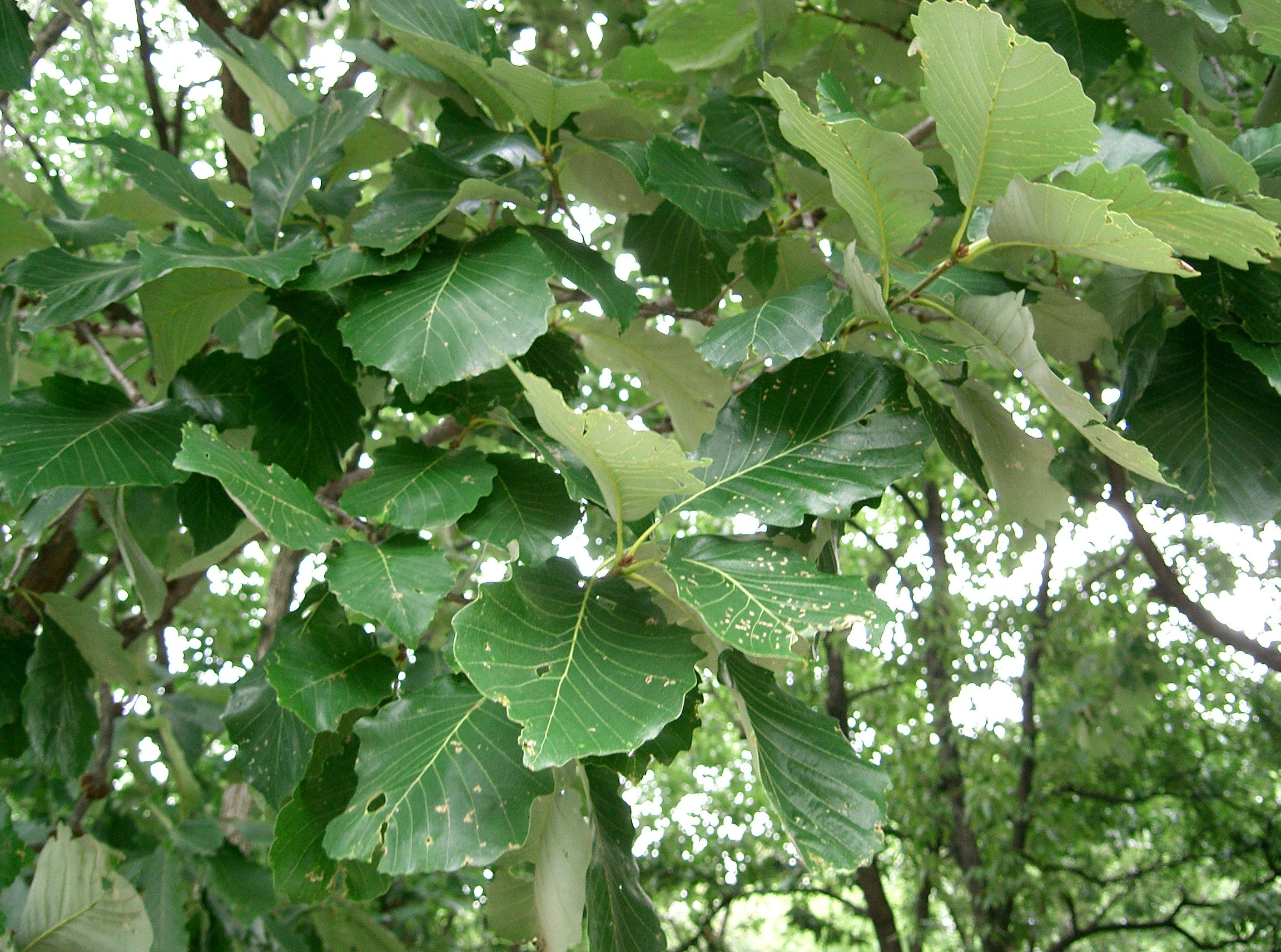
Foliage, showing the grey-white undersides of the leaves

It is a deciduous tree growing to 30 metres (98 ft) tall with a trunk up to 1 m (3 ft) in diameter with fissured gray-brown bark. The leaves are obovate to oblong, glabrous above, glabrous to densely grey-white hairy below, mostly 10–20 centimetres (4–8 inches) long and 5–14 cm (2–5 1/2 in) wide (rarely up to 30 cm (12 in) long and 16 cm (6 in) wide), with 9 to 15 lobes on each side, and a 10–13 mm (3/8–1/2 in) petiole.

The flowers monecious catkins. The acorns are 17–25 mm (5/8–1 in) long and 13–18 mm (1/2–3/4 in) wide, a third to a half enclosed in a green-grey cup on a short peduncle; they are solitary or 2–3 together, and mature in about six months from pollination. A long-lived tree, it is slow-growing.

== Taxonomy ==
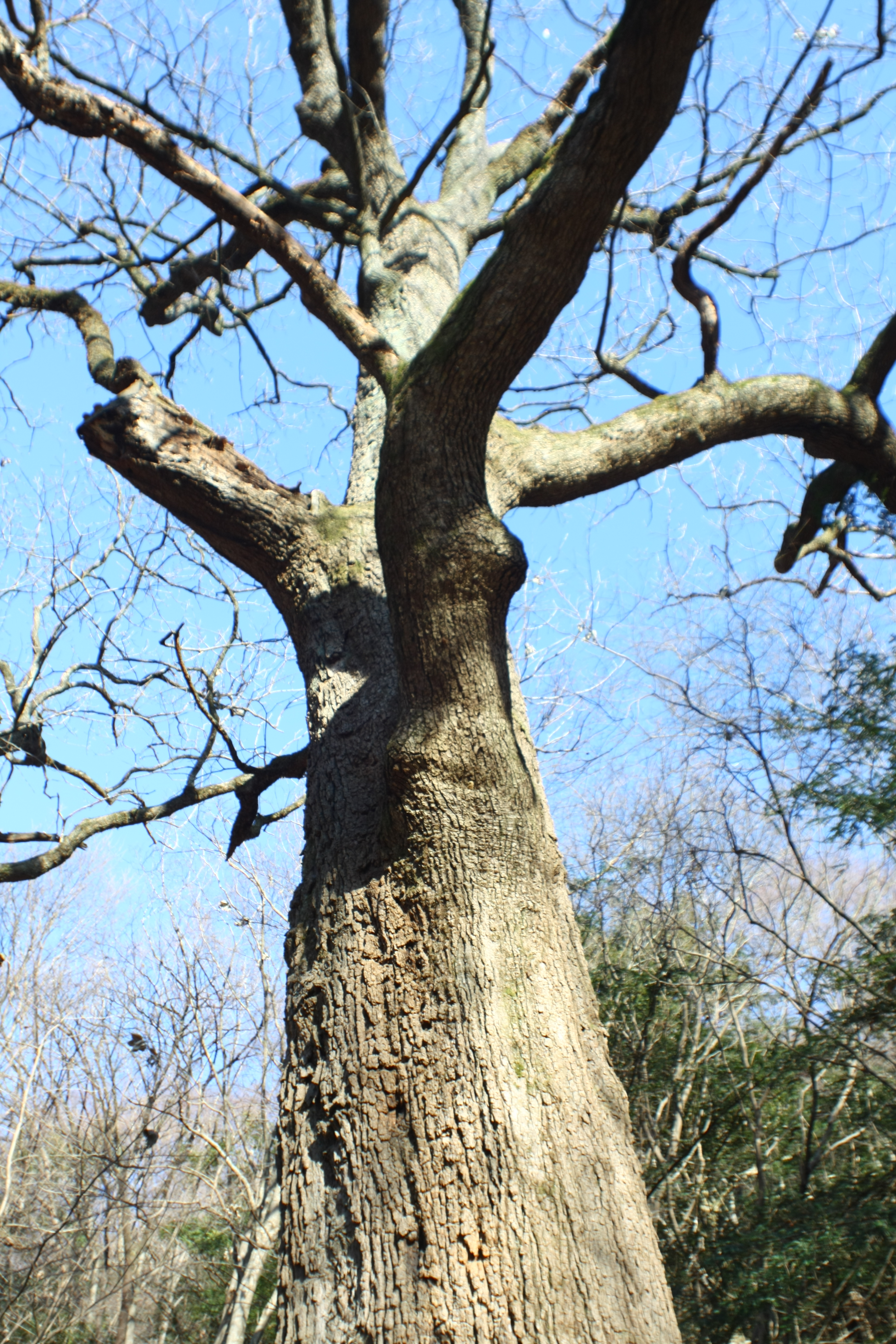
Tree in winter

Three to five varieties are accepted:

- Quercus aliena var. aliena. Leaf margin wavy; leaf greyish below.
- Quercus aliena var. acutiserrata Maxim. Leaf margin serrated, with sharp serration; leaf densely hairy below with greyish hairs.
- Quercus aliena var. pekingensis Schottky. Leaf margin serrated, with rounded serration; leaf glabrous or only slightly hairy below.
- Quercus aliena var. alticupulifirmis H.Wei Jen & L.M.Wang (not accepted by Flora of China).
- Quercus aliena var. pellucida Blume (not accepted by Flora of China).

Hybrids between Quercus aliena and several other oaks in Quercus sect. Quercus are known.

=== Common names ===
In China it is called ruìchí húlì, or húlì. Quercus aliena var. acutiserrata is referred to as ruìchí húlì, while var. aliena is referred to as húlì. In Japan it is called naragashiwa.

== Distribution ==
It is native to Korea, Japan (where it occurs in Honshu, Shikoku, and Kyushu), Taiwan, China (where it occurs in the provinces of Anhui, Gansu, Guangdong, Guangxi, Guizhou, Hainan, Hebei, Henan, Hubei, Hunan, Jiangsu, Jiangxi, Liaoning, Shaanxi, Shandong, Shanxi, Sichuan, Yunnan, and Zhejiang), Primorsky Krai in the Russian Far East, Laos, Myanmar, and Thailand.

== Cultivation and uses ==
The wood is used in East Asia for boat building and wood flooring for houses. The seeds can be crushed into a powder and used as a soup thickener and for mixing into cereals and breads. The seeds when roasted can also be used as a substitute for coffee. Galls produced by the larvae of insects are a rich source of tannin.

Quercus aliena was introduced to Europe in 1908, but remains rare in cultivation outside of its native area. The taproot is deep, making older plants difficult to move. It grows in full sun or partial shade and tolerates strong winds. It can grow in almost any type of soil as long as not waterlogged.
