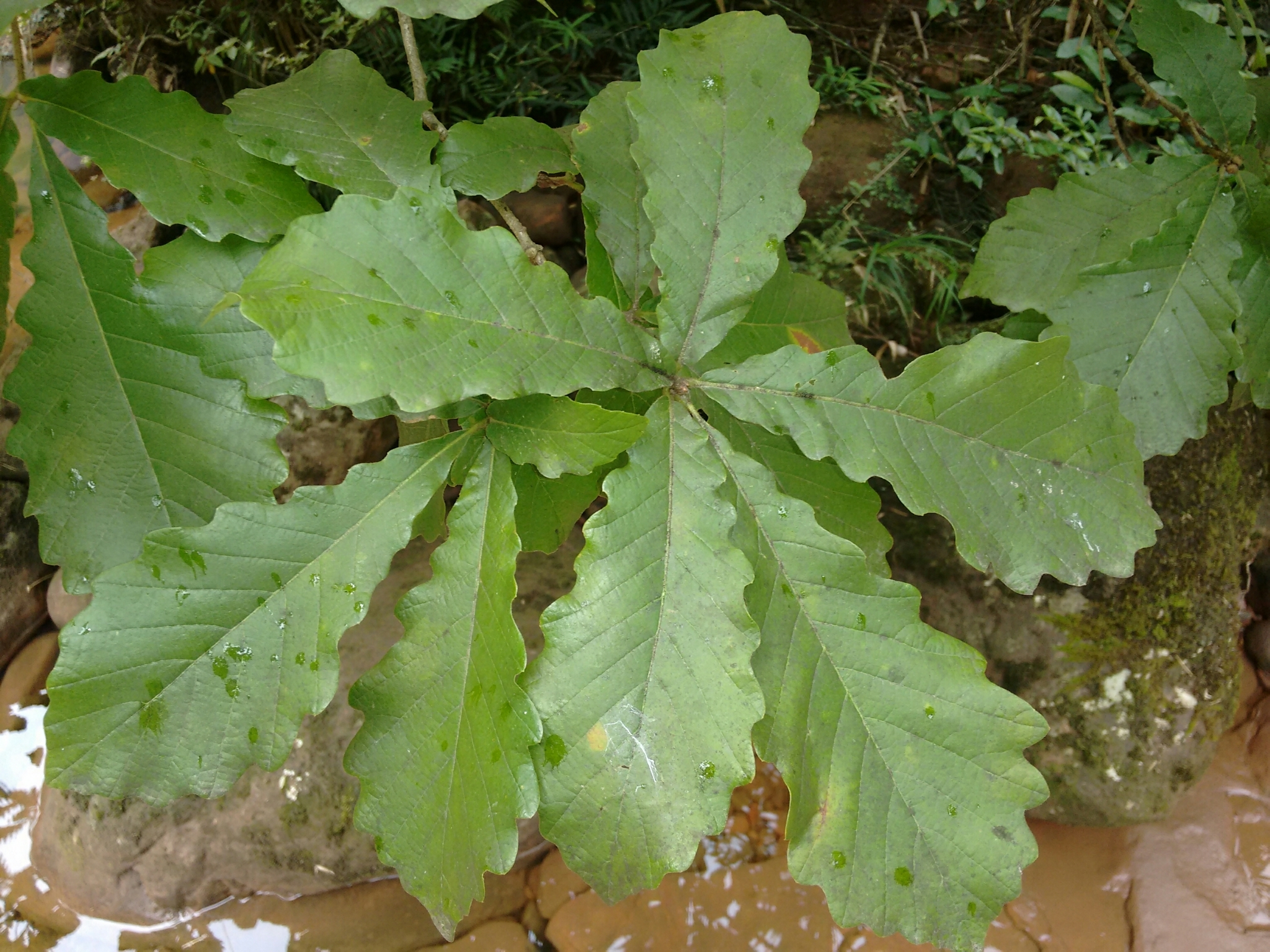

Conservation status
- Least Concern (IUCN 3.1)

Scientific classification
- Kingdom: Plantae
- Clade: Embryophytes
- Clade: Tracheophytes
- Clade: Spermatophytes
- Clade: Angiosperms
- Clade: Eudicots
- Clade: Rosids
- Order: Fagales
- Family: Fagaceae
- Genus: Quercus
- Subgenus: Quercus subg. Quercus
- Section: Quercus sect. Quercus
- Species: Q. fabri

Binomial name
- Quercus fabri Hance

Synonyms
- Quercus fabrei Hance

= Quercus fabri =

Faber's oak

Species of oak tree

Quercus fabri, or Faber's oak, is a species of deciduous oak tree found in southern China and Korea.

Faber's oak can take on the form of either a large shrub or a tree, with the latter form reaching up to 20 metres in height. The tree has elongated leaves, with the tip of the leaf being wider than the base. The leaves are serrated, although the teeth are smaller than those of more well-known oak species such as Quercus robur.
