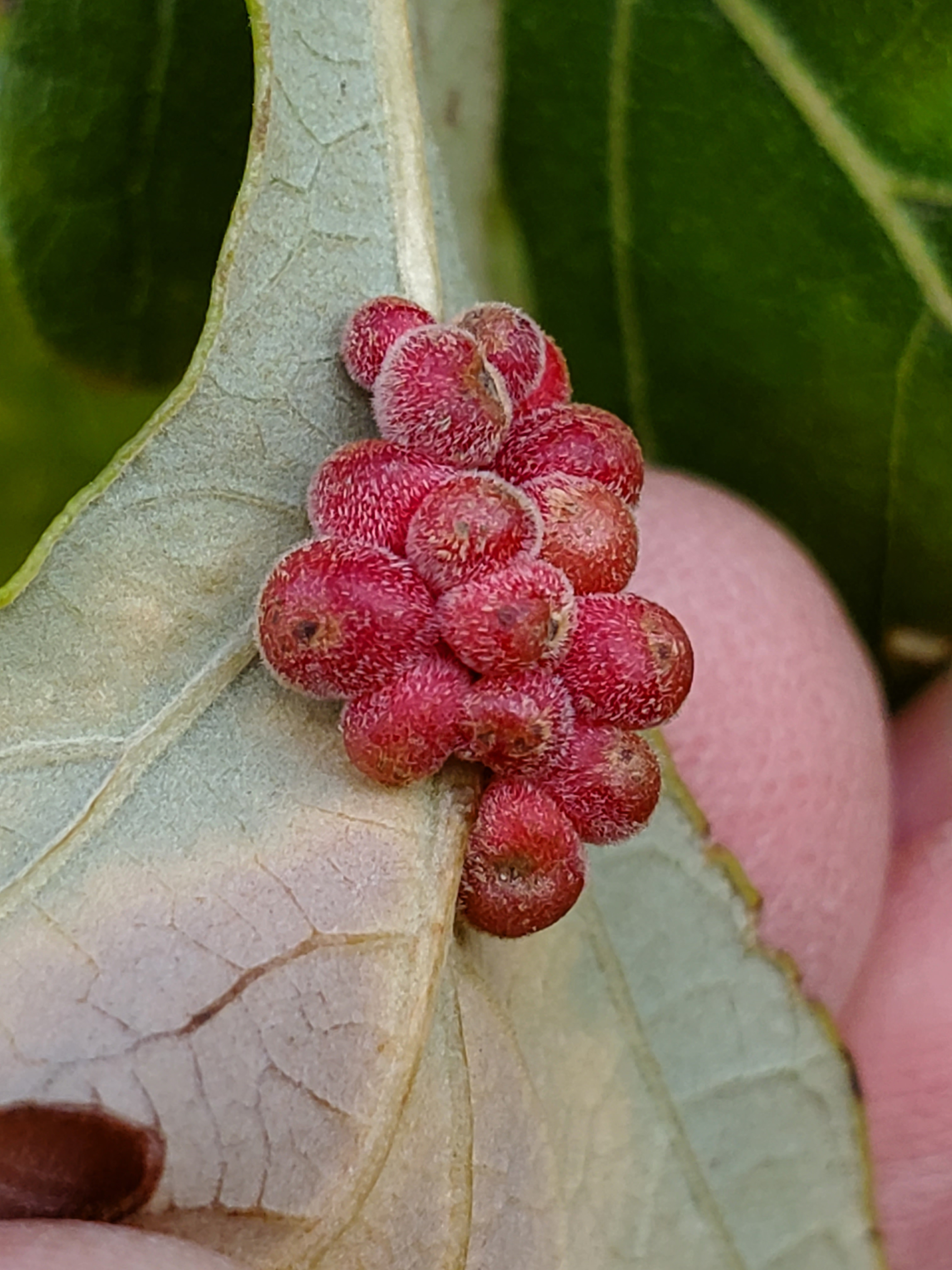
- Andricus dimorphus galls on Bur Oak leaf

Scientific classification
- Kingdom: Animalia
- Phylum: Arthropoda
- Class: Insecta
- Order: Hymenoptera
- Family: Cynipidae
- Subfamily: Cynipinae; Latreille, 1802

= Cynipinae =

Subfamily of insects

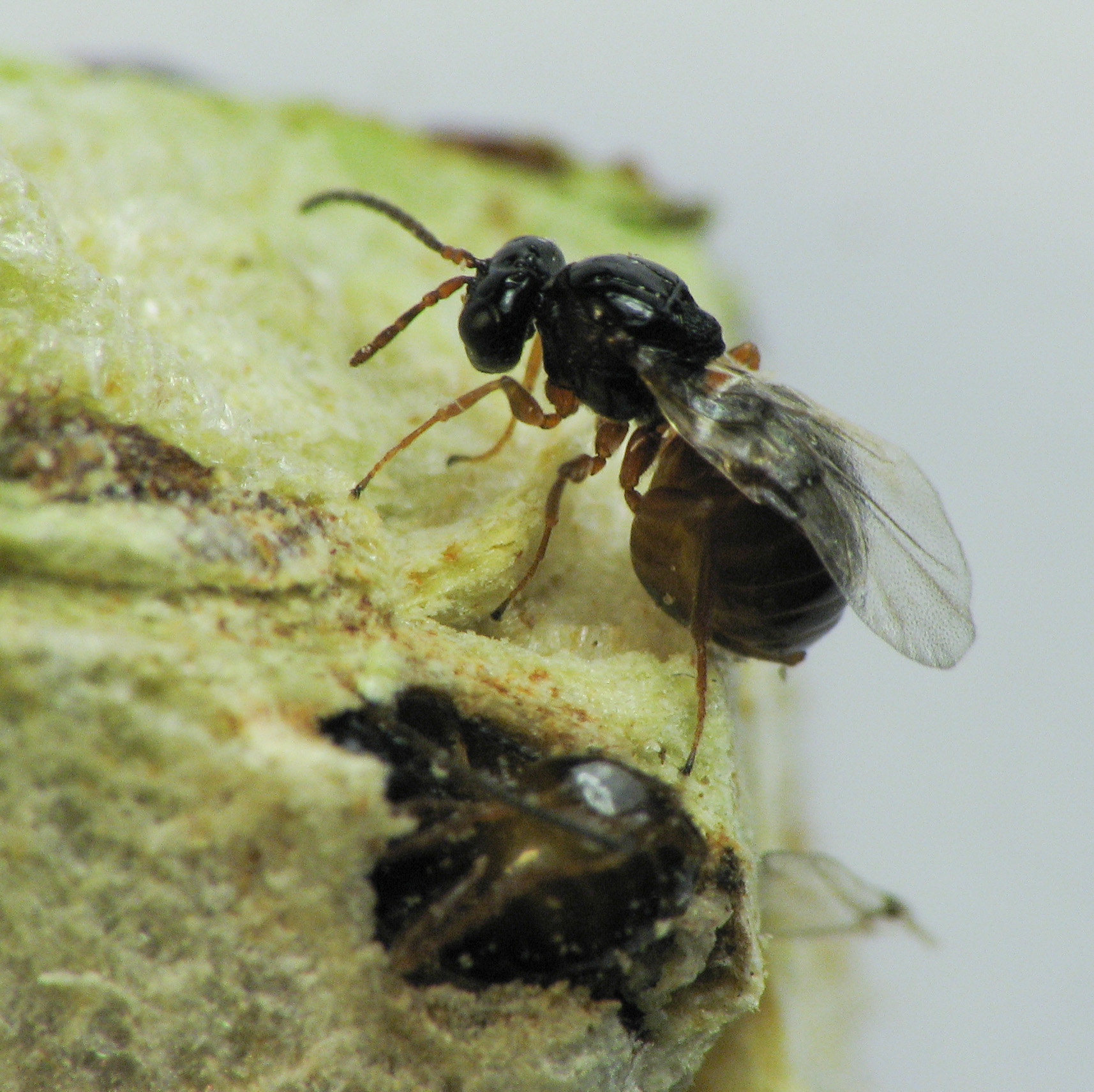
Diastrophus nebulosus (tribe Diastrophini) emerging from gall

Cynipinae is a subfamily of gall wasps (Cynipidae). Many of the approximately 1,500 described species cause galls on oaks, but some induce galls on other plant species or are inquilines of the gall-inducing species. Species occur on all continents, except Antarctica, with most found in the temperate regions of the northern hemisphere. All extant cynipid species are within Cynipinae since the only other recognized subfamily is Hodiernocynipinae, which is based on the fossil genus Hodiernocynips.

== Tribes ==
There are 9 tribes currently recognized within Cynipinae:

- Aylacini
- Aulacideini
- Ceroptresini
- Cynipini (oak gall wasps)
- Diastrophini
- Eschatocerini
- Phanacidini
- Qwaqwaiini
- Synergini
