= Inquiline =

Animal that lives commensally in the dwelling place of another species

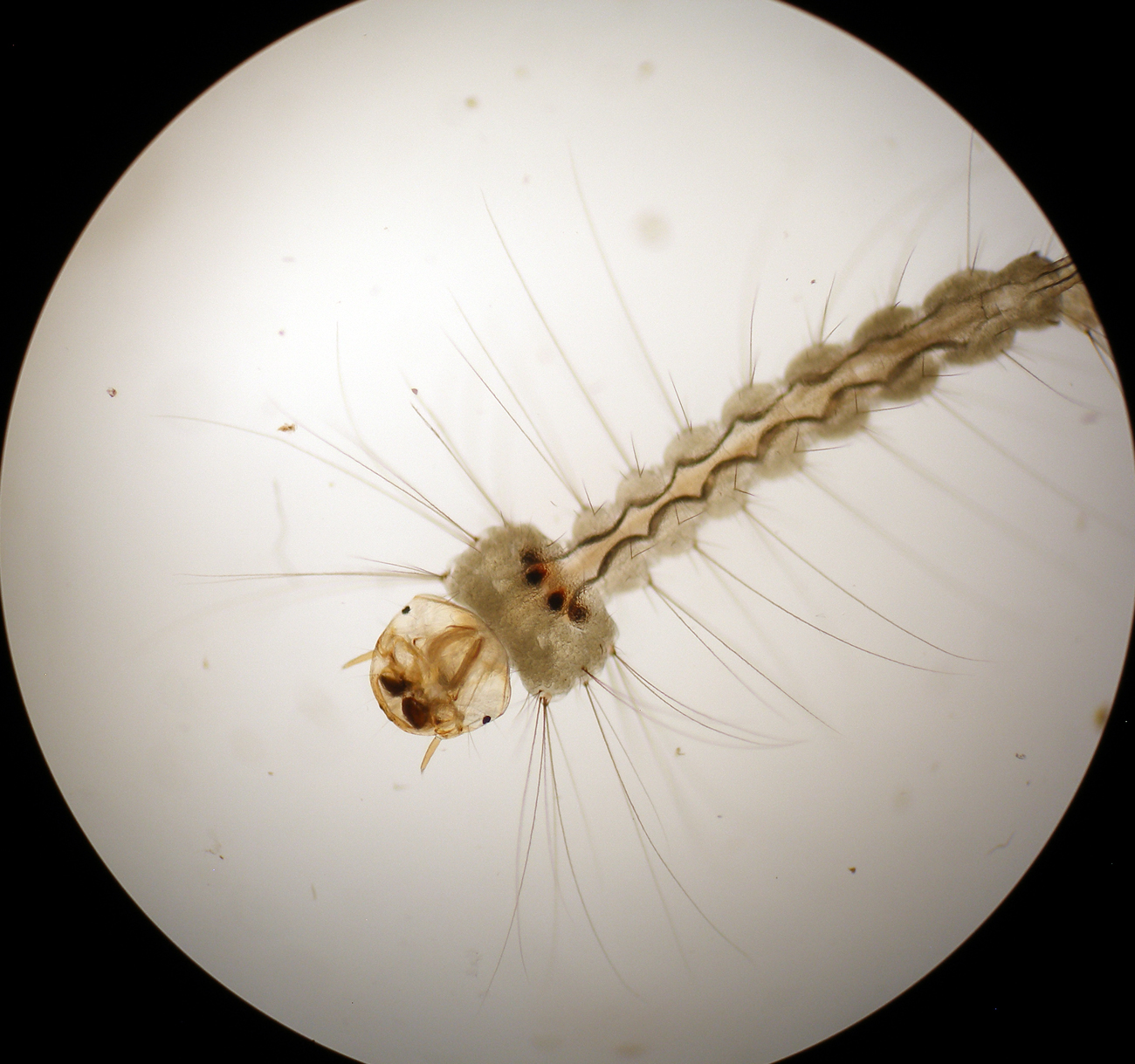
Wyeomyia smithii larva is an inquiline species in the pitcher leaves of Sarracenia purpurea (magnification 40X).

In zoology, an inquiline (from Latin inquilinus, "lodger" or "tenant") is an animal that lives in the nest, burrow, or dwelling place of an animal of another species. For example, some organisms, such as insects, may live in the homes of gophers or the garages of humans and feed on debris, fungi, roots, etc. The most widely distributed types of inquiline are those found in association with the nests of social insects, especially ants and termites – a single colony may support dozens of different inquiline species. The distinctions between parasites, social parasites, and inquilines are subtle, and many species may fulfill the criteria for more than one of these, as inquilines do exhibit many of the same characteristics as parasites. However, parasites are specifically not inquilines, because by definition they have a deleterious effect on the host species, while inquilines have not been confirmed to do so.

In the specific case of termites, the term "inquiline" is restricted to termite species that inhabit other termite species' nests whereas other arthropods cohabiting termitaria are called "termitophiles". It is important to reiterate that inquilinism in termites (Blattodea, formerly Isoptera) contrasts with the inquilinism observed in other eusocial insects such as ants and bees (Hymenoptera), even though the term "inquiline" has been adopted in both cases. A major distinction is that, while in the former the species mostly resemble forms of commensalism, the latter includes species currently confirmed as social parasites, thus, being closely related to parasitism.

Inquilines are known especially among the gall wasps (Cynipidae family). In the sub-family Synerginae, this mode of life predominates. These insects are similar in structure to the true gall-inducing wasp but do not produce galls, instead, they deposit their eggs within those of other species. They infest certain species of galls, such as those of the blackberry and some oak galls, in large numbers, and sometimes more than one kind occur in a single gall. Perhaps the most remarkable feature of these inquilines is their frequent close resemblance to the insect that produces the gall they infest.

The term inquiline has also been applied to aquatic invertebrates that spend all or part of their life cycles in phytotelmata, water-filled structures produced by plants. For example, Wyeomyia smithii, Metriocnemus knabi, and Habrotrocha rosa are three invertebrates that make up part of the microecosystem within the pitchers of Sarracenia purpurea. Some species of pitcher plants like the Nepenthes and Cephalotus produce acidic, toxic or digestive fluids and host a limited diversity of inquilines. Other pitcher plant species like the Sarracenia or Heliamphora host diverse organisms and depend to a large extent on their symbionts for prey utilization.

== See also ==
- Mutualism (biology)
