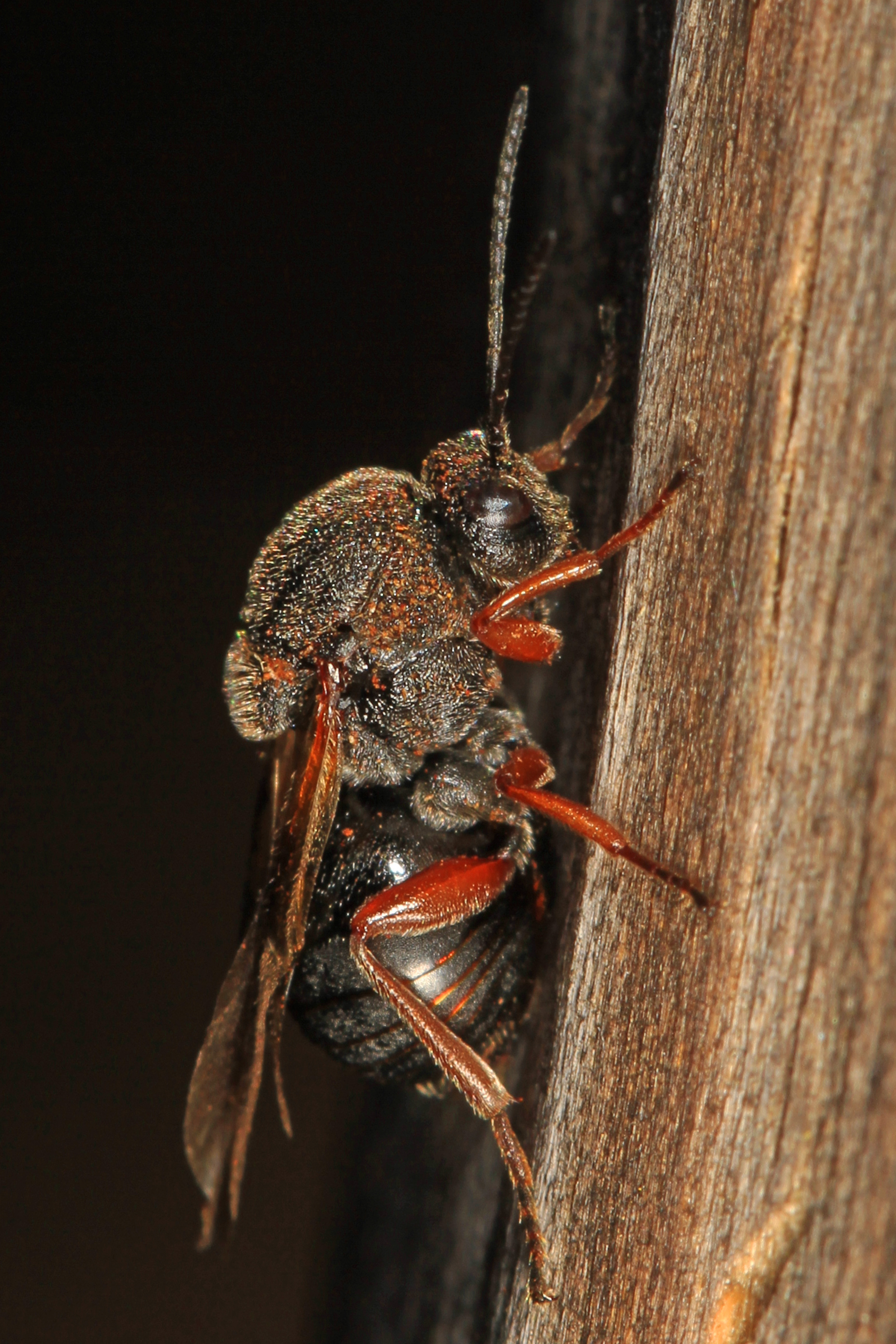

Scientific classification
- Kingdom: Animalia
- Phylum: Arthropoda
- Clade: Pancrustacea
- Class: Insecta
- Order: Hymenoptera
- Suborder: Apocrita
- Infraorder: Proctotrupomorpha
- Superfamily: Cynipoidea
- Family: Cynipidae; Latreille, 1802

Diversity
- at least 80 genera

= Gall wasp =

Family of wasps

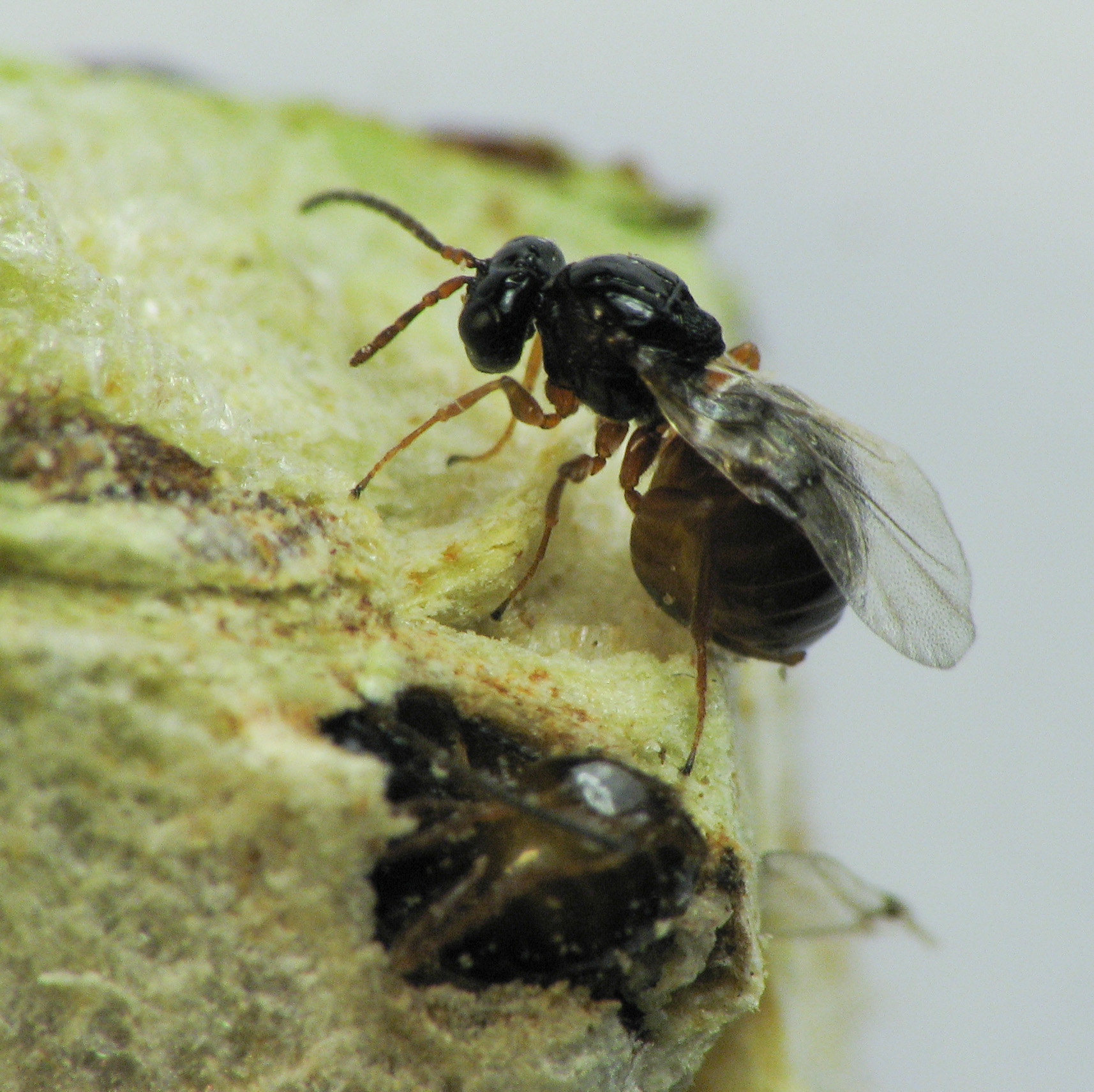
Diastrophus nebulosus on a raspberry gall

Gall wasps, also traditionally called gallflies, or cynipids, are hymenopterans of the family Cynipidae in the wasp superfamily Cynipoidea. Their common name comes from the galls they induce on plants for larval development. About 1,300 species of cynipids are known worldwide, with about 360 species of 36 different genera in Europe and some 800 species in North America. Paraulacidae and Diplolepididae were traditionally included within the Cynipidae but have since been designated as their own families after recent phylogenetic studies.

== Features ==
Like all Apocrita, gall wasps have a distinctive body shape, the so-called wasp waist. The first abdominal tergum (the propodeum) is conjoined with the thorax, while the second abdominal segment forms a sort of shaft, the petiole. The petiole connects with the gaster, which is the functional abdomen in apocritan wasps, starting with the third abdominal segment proper.

For macropterous species, wing venation is used to diagnose the superfamily Cynipoidea and to separate the family Cynipidae proper from similar families within Cynipoidea (e.g. Figitidae, Liopteridae).

The antennae are straight and consist of two or three segments. In many species, the backside of the mesosoma appears longitudinally banded. The wings are typically simply structured. The female's egg-depositing ovipositor is often seen protruding from the tip of the metasoma.

== Reproduction and development ==
Gall wasp larvae typically develop as either gall inducers or as inquilines of other gall wasps, as is the case in the genus Synergus. Females lay eggs in various plant tissues from which the growth of the gall structure is induced. Larvae feed on the nutritive tissues of these galls before pupating and emerging from the galls as adults. Different gall wasp species are able to induce galls on a large variety of plant organs with species producing galls on leaves, petioles, buds, flowers, roots, fruits, and branches/stems.

The reproduction of gall wasps is usually heterogonic, where lifecycles feature both a parthenogenic generation, in which individuals reproduce asexually, and a dioecious generation, requiring both males and females for sexual reproduction. Most species have alternating generations, with one sexual generation and one asexual parthenogenic generation annually. However, some species reproduce entirely parthenogenically. Both thelytoky and arrhenotoky have been observed among the heterogonic species. The cause of the arisal of parthenogenesis among Cynipidae remains unclear. Though infection by endosymbiotic Wolbachia bacteria has been shown to cause parthenogenesis in some studies, the evidence is inconsistent among different tribes in the family.

Gall wasps are known from a large variety of plant species, including many species of the Fagaceae, Rosaceae, Asteraceae, Papaveraceae, Lamiaceae, and Caprifoliaceae, among the more common host families. Host breadth is moderately conserved among gall wasps, with multiple repeated host shifts representing major divergences among the various lineages in the family. In contrast, speciation events and divergence at lower taxonomic levels are more associated with shifts in plant organ use. Host breadth within a species is usually restricted to one or a few closely related plant host species. However, the different generations within a species may exploit different sets of host species as well as different plant organs to complete their life cycles.

== Natural enemies ==
Despite being concealed within galls, gall wasp larvae and pupae are the target of many parasitoid species, particularly wasps in the superfamily Chalcidoidea. These parasitoids penetrate gall tissues with their ovipositors to lay eggs on or in the host gall wasp. Gall wasps may also be accidentally or facultatively killed by inquilines which accidentally injure the gall wasp while feeding on surrounding plant gall tissue or by causing changes to gall morphology.

The evolutionary pressure caused by these natural enemies provides the basis for one of the explanations for the evolution of galling behaviour across multiple galling insect lineages. The enemy hypothesis states that galls and their diverse morphologies evolved as defenses against parasitoids and other natural enemies. This hypothesis explains the wide variety in gall surface ornaments, internal gall morphology, and the overall shape of the galls produced by gall wasps. The many parasitoids present across the Cynipidae, though, indicate that the parasitoids are able to adapt to these defenses and that some form of coevolution is present in this biological system.

Documenting and studying the community of natural enemies exploiting cynipids and their galls remains an active research avenue in ecology and evolutionary biology. Due to the concealed nature of this community, though, designating emerging insects as hosts, parasitoids of the hosts, inquilines, parasitoids of the inquilines, or hyperparasitoids is often difficult.

== Gall morphology ==
The mechanism underlying gall development historically has been one of the main challenges in understanding the biology of gall wasps. Female wasps lay their eggs within the meristematic tissue of the host plant and secrete chemicals inducing apoptosis of surrounding plant tissue. The metabolome of the local plant tissue changes, causing the development of the abnormal gall growth. These changes are modulated by the gall wasp and thus, galls represent an extended phenotype of the wasp. Although past hypotheses have suggested mutualisms with viruses or virus-like particles, little evidence exists for these as effectors in gall development.

Galls produced by cynipid gall wasps bear a striking diversity in external and internal morphology. The presence of varying levels of anthocyanins lead to a diversity of colours and colour patterns on galls which is hypothesized to be an aposematic adaptation among galls more broadly. Galls may bear various ornaments, such as hairs, hooks, spines, pegs, or thorns of varying lengths and densities. Some species produce sticky substances on the gall surface, which is hypothesized to deter parasitoids, either by making walking on gall surfaces more difficult for parasitoids, or through myrmecophily by recruiting ants to defend the gall. Internally, galls can also possess various empty cavities or hairs, which may also render parasitism more difficult.

Below are some selected images of various galls produced by cynipid gall wasps:

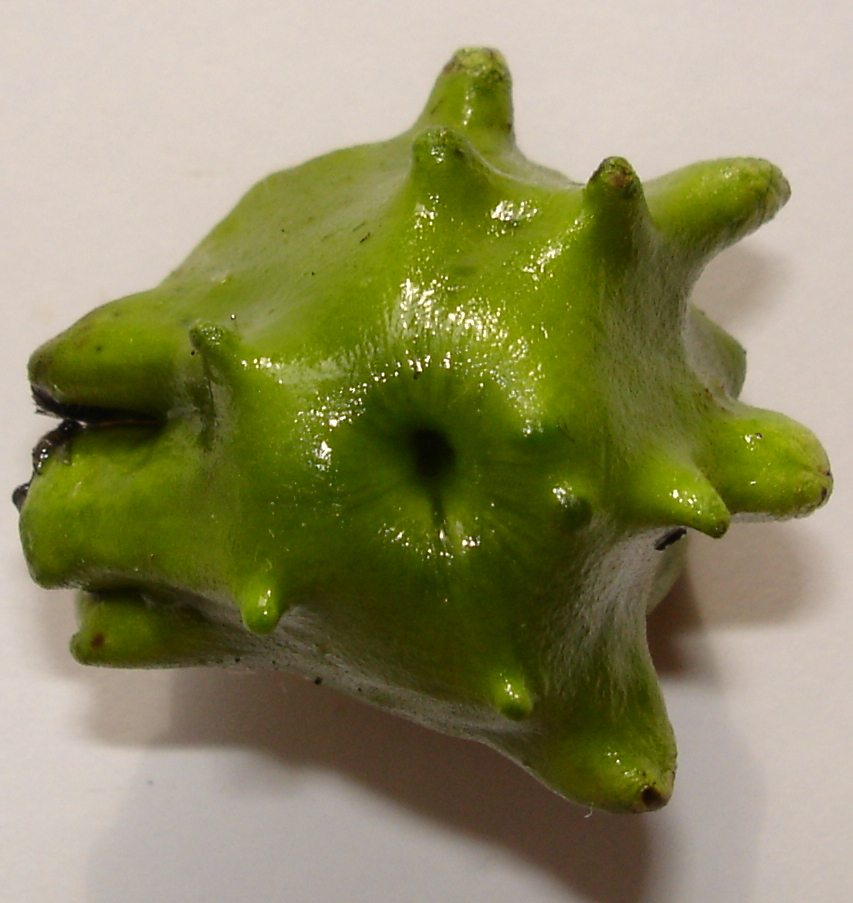
Andricus quercuscalicis parthenogenetic generation gall

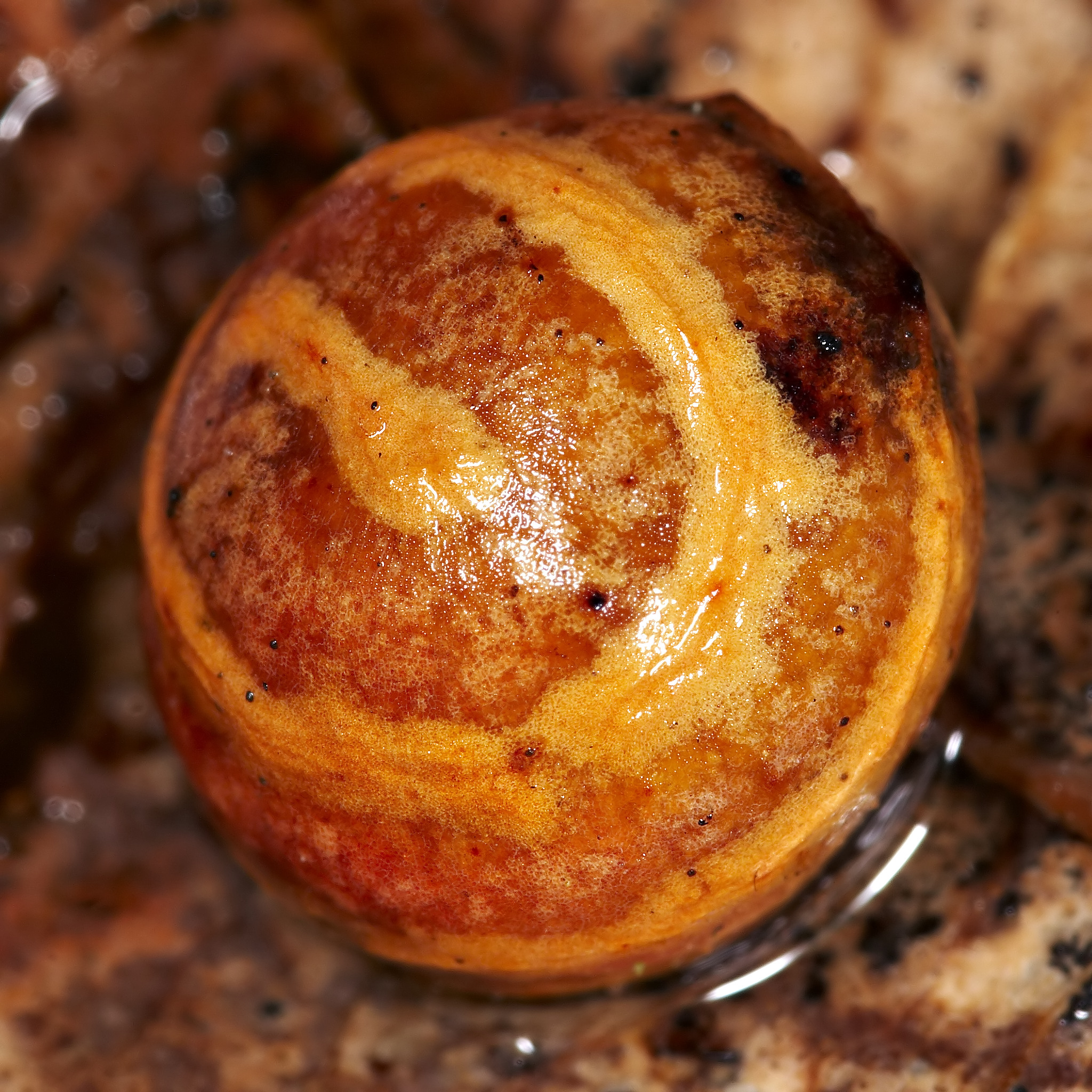
Cynips longiventris parthenogenetic generation gall

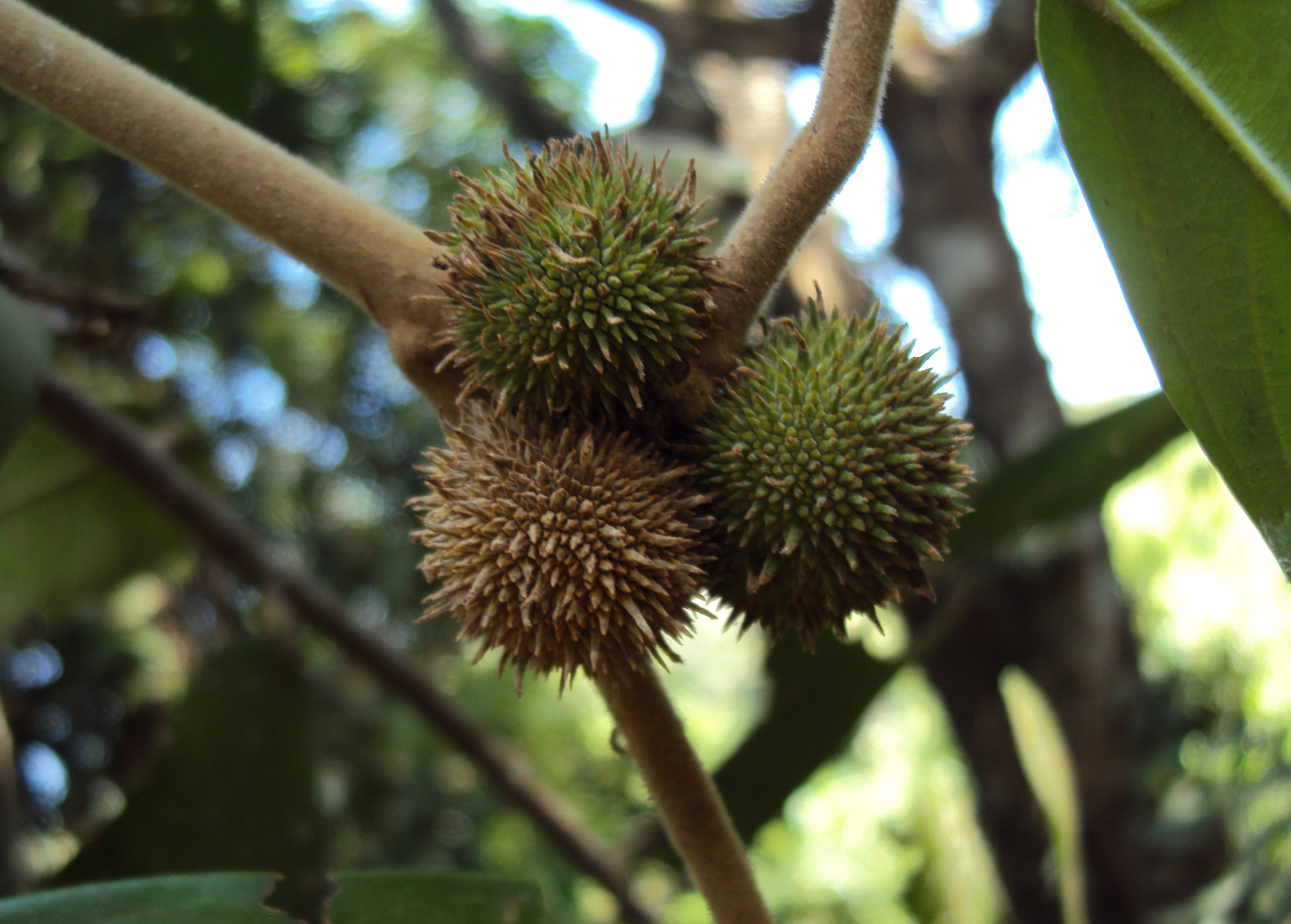
Galls on Hopea ponga at Peravoor

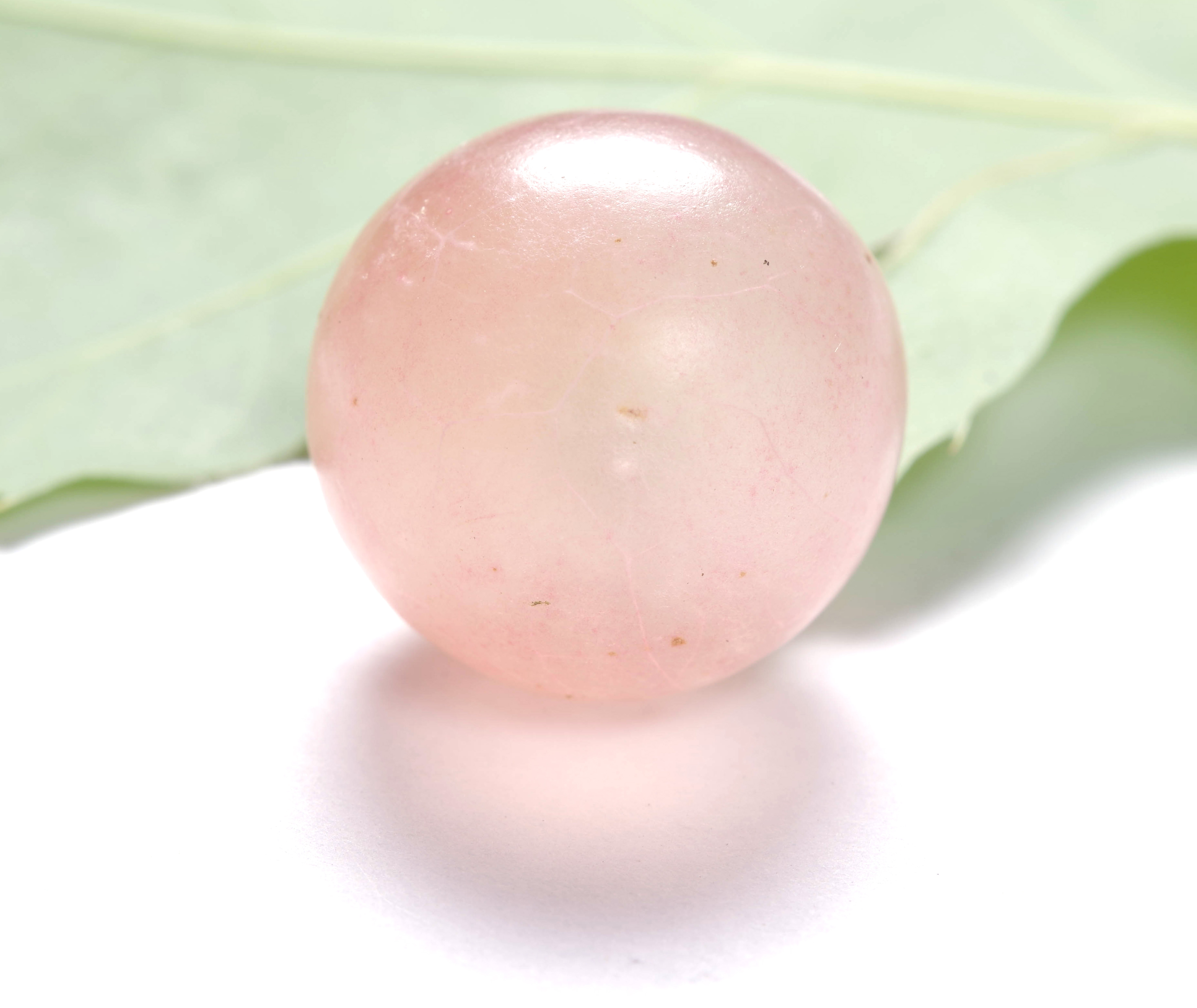
Amphibolips nubilipennis gall from Pennsylvania, USA

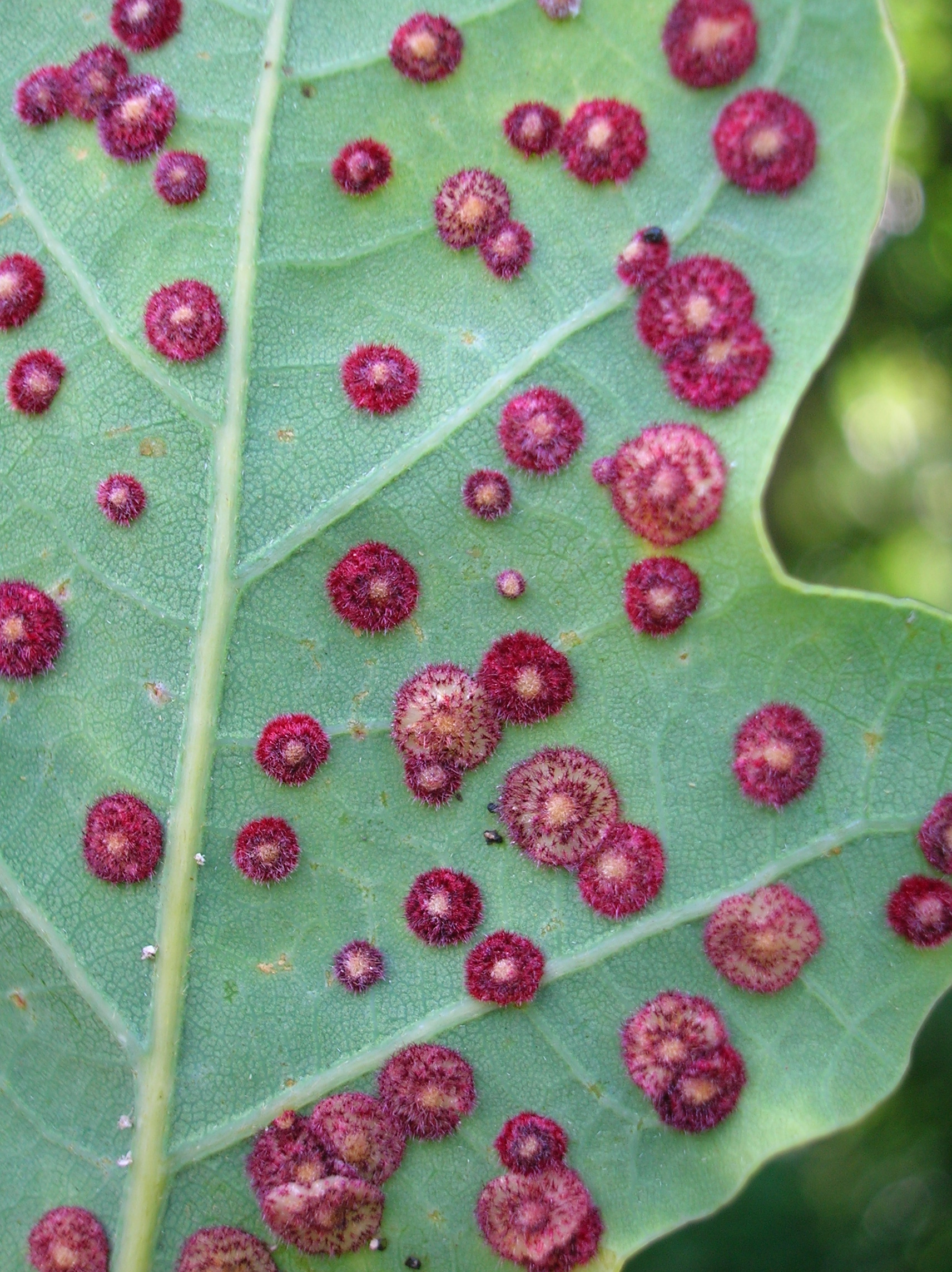
Neuroterus quercusbaccarum gall from Scotland, UK

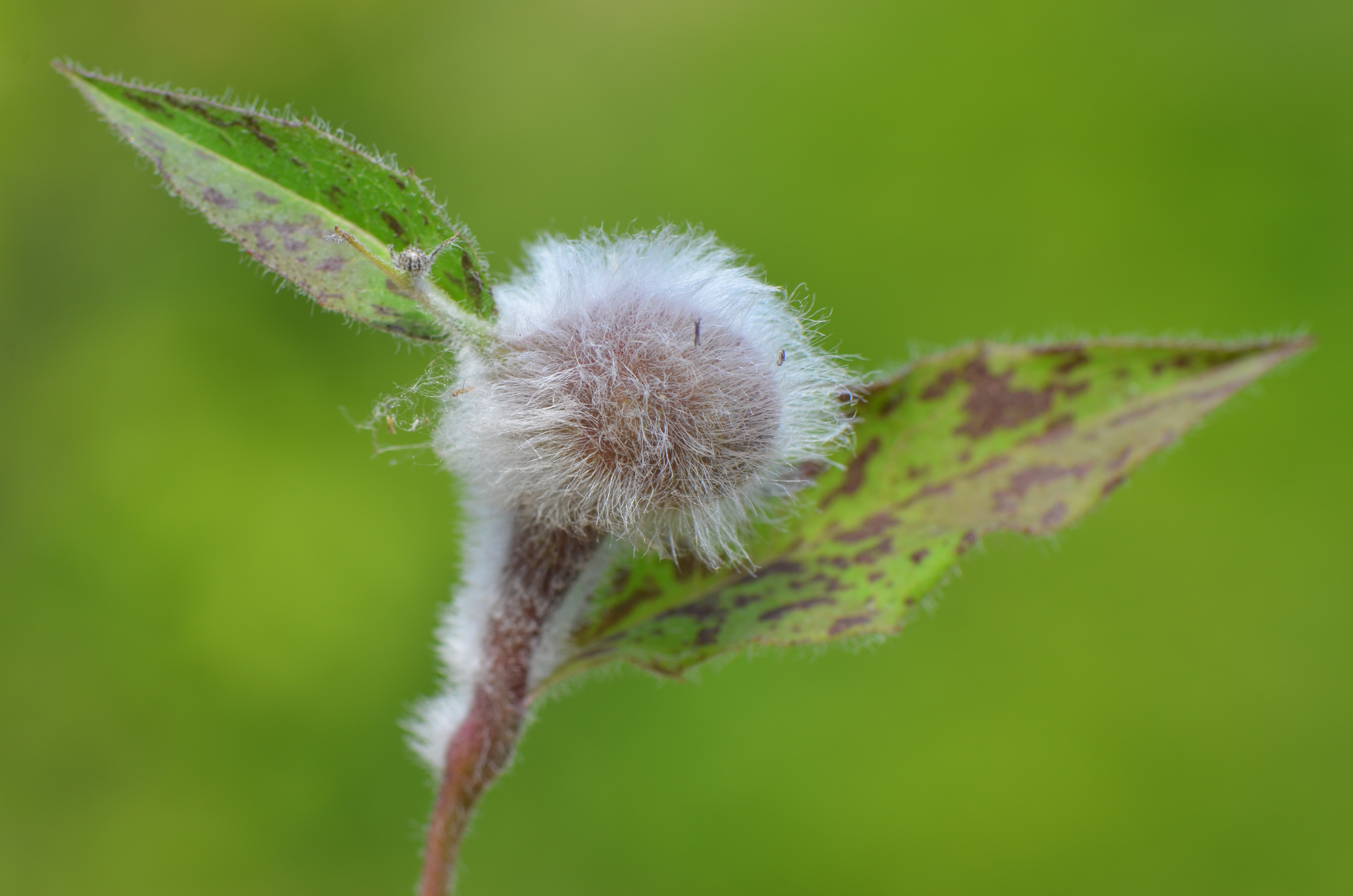
Aulacidea hieracii gall

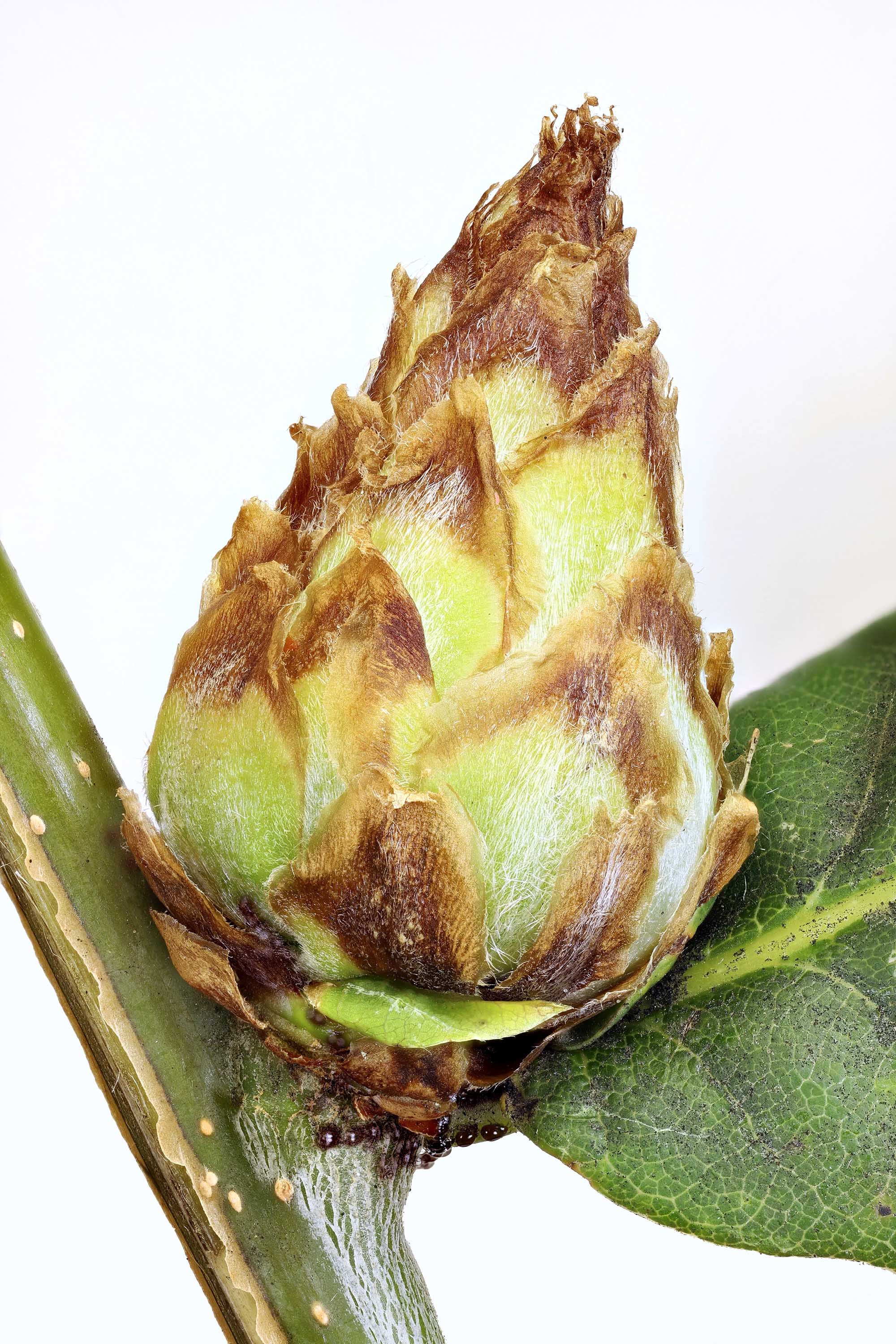
Andricus foecundatrix gall from Wales, UK

== Evolution ==
=== External phylogeny ===
The external phylogeny of the Cynipidae is based on Peters et al. 2017. The Apocrita are within the "sawflies", which are shown separately for simplicity here.

- Hymenoptera
  - Sawflies (paraphyletic)
  - Apocrita
    - Parasitoida
      - - Ceraphronoidea
        - Ichneumonoidea
      - Proctotrupomorpha
        - Cynipoidea
          - Cynipidae
          - other families
        - Chalcidoidea and other groups
    - - - Evanioidea
        - Stephanoidea
      - - Trigonaloidea
        - Aculeata (stinging wasps, bees, ants)

=== Internal phylogeny ===
The internal phylogeny of gall wasps in the cladogram is based on the molecular phylogenetic analysis of Hearn et al. 2023.

- Cynipidae
  - - Eschatocerini
    - - - Phanacidini
        - Aulacideini
      - - - Qwaqwaiini
          - Synergini (inquiline gall wasps)
        - - Diastrophini
          - - - Ceroptresini (inquiline oak gall wasps)
              - Aylacini
            - - Cynipini (oak gall wasps)

=== Taxonomy ===
The Cynipidae contain two subfamilies, one extinct and one extant:

- Cynipinae
- Hodiernocynipinae†

The Cynipinae consist of nine tribes:

- Aulacideini Nieves-Aldrey, Nylander & Ronquist, 2015.
- Aylacini Ashmead, 1903.
- Ceroptresini Nieves-Aldrey, Nylander & Ronquist, 2015.
- Cynipini Billberg, 1820.
- Diastrophini Nieves-Aldrey, Nylander & Ronquist, 2015.
- Eschatocerini Ashmead, 1903.
- Phanacidini Nieves-Aldrey, Nylander & Ronquist, 2015.
- Qwaqwaiini Liljeblad, Nieves-Aldrey & Melika, 2011.
- Synergini Ashmead, 1896.

== In human culture ==
- The galls of several species, especially Mediterranean variants, were once used as tanning agents.
- Before his work in human sexuality, Alfred Kinsey was known for his study of gall wasps.
- Galls formed on oak trees are one of the main ingredients in iron gall ink.
- Galls of some species have been used across various cultures in traditional medicine.

== See also ==
- Oak apple
- Oak marble gall
- Knopper gall
- Common spangle gall
- Silk button gall
