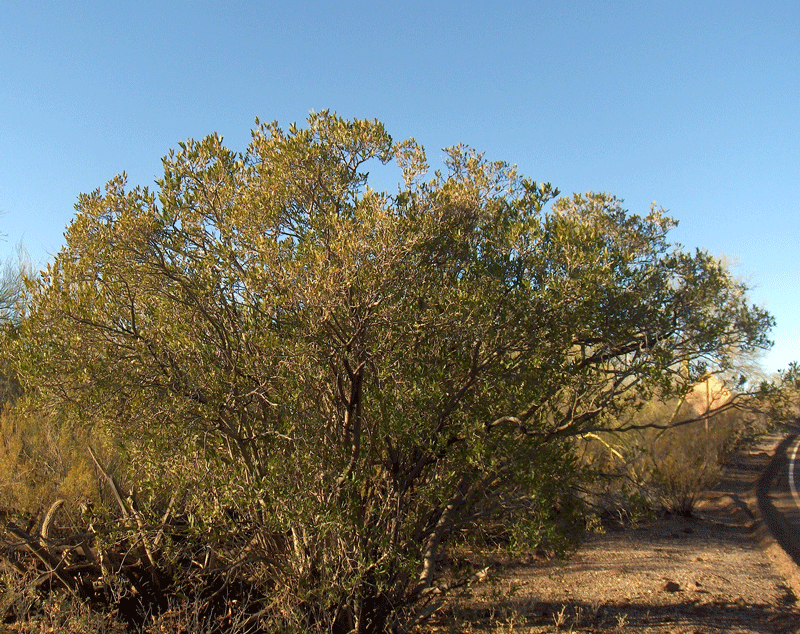

Scientific classification
- Kingdom: Plantae
- Clade: Tracheophytes
- Clade: Angiosperms
- Clade: Eudicots
- Clade: Rosids
- Order: Malpighiales
- Family: Euphorbiaceae
- Genus: Sebastiania
- Species: S. pavoniana

Binomial name
- Sebastiania pavoniana (Müll.Arg.) Müll.Arg., 1866
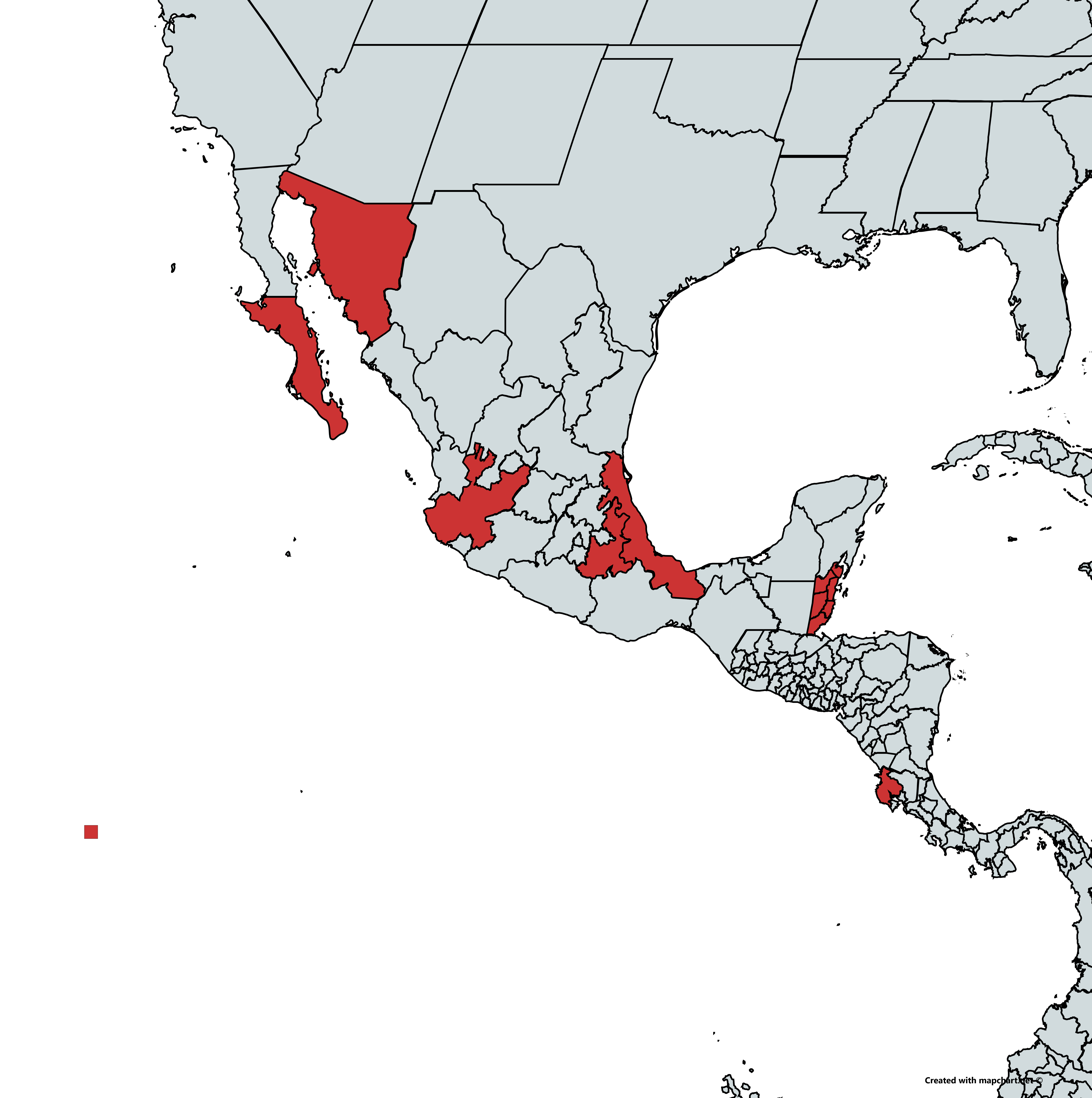
- Range of Sebastiania pavoniana

Synonyms
- Gymnanthes pavoniana Müll.Arg.; Gymnanthis pavoniana Müll.Arg.; Gymnanthes pringlei S.Watson ex Pax; Sebastiania palmeri Rose; Sebastiania pringlei S.Watson; Sebastiania ramirezii Maury

= Sebastiania pavoniana =

Species of tree

Sebastiania pavoniana is a species of tree in the spurge family native to Mexico and northwest Costa Rica. It is the 'bean' part of the Mexican jumping bean, despite not being a legume like true beans. The 'jumping' is provided by the larva of the jumping bean moth (Cydia saltitans).

== Name ==
The term 'Mexican jumping bean' usually refers to the seeds that have been attacked by moth larvae, but the entire plant is also called a 'Mexican jumping bean.' It was difficult to determine the species of plant responsible for the novelty item at first, as the C. saltitans larva leaves the seed sterile. In addition, a related plant Sapium biloculare (syn. Pleradenophora bilocularis) also has jumping seeds and is also commonly called 'Mexican jumping bean.' However S. pavoniana is the species most commonly sold as curios.

In Spanish, it is called semillas brincadoras ('jumper seeds'), or simply brincador ('jumper'). Other Spanish names include palo de flecha ('arrow wood') and yerba de flecha ('arrow herb'), but it is not used to create or poison arrows. In Mayan it is called túbucti. The Aztecs call it mincapatli (or miccapatli) which means "herb of death," but the name is understood as 'seeds against death' and not as causing death. The Yaqui named the seeds echimu-chechepete (seeds that jump). The seeds are called wurmiger Kaffee in German.

Johannes Müller Argoviensis when he originally described the species first placed it in Gymnanthes sect. Stenogussonia, but the species was later transferred to Sebastiania.

The specific epithet pavoniana might derive from the Latin pavon ('peafowl'). However neither the flowers nor fruit are peacock blue or any other shade of blue, but more of a greenish yellow. The seeds do have a spot that might abstractly resemble the eyespot on a peacock's tail feathers. The most likely etymology honors José Antonio Pavón Jiménez, from whose collection the species was originally described.

== Description ==
S. pavoniana is a slender tree or large shrub that grows up to 10–12 metres (33–39 ft) tall. The trunk diameter at breast height is 6.7–10.1 centimetres (2.6–4.0 in). Initially it can resemble Excoecaria indica, but the female calyx is eglandulose (lacking glands) inside.

The branches have subterete twigs with leaves that are up to 8 cm long by 3 1/2 cm wide, but often smaller. The leaves are membranous, fuscous, and glabrous. The leaf shape is oblong-ovate to oblong-subelliptical. The base is obtuse, with the apex shortly cuspidate-acuminate. Margins are bluntly crenate-serrate. Petioles are short, about 8 mm long.

Spines are shorter than the leaves, about 3-5 1/2 cm long.

Bracts are broadly ovate, subtruncate, and lacerate-denticulate.

The plant is monoecious, and thus has both male flowers and female flowers on the same individuals. Female flowers have a calyx with sessile laciniae. The ovary is appressed, broadly ovate, apiculate, and denticulate. The style column is very short. Sepals of male flowers are subulate and entire. Male flowers have short pedicels with younger ones subsessile.

S. pavoniana has cryptic fruit with hard capsules. Each fruit has three sections.

== Distribution ==
S. pavoniana is native to northwest Costa Rica in Guanacaste Province, and Mexico, including the states of Baja California Sur, Puebla, Sonora, Jalisco, and Veracruz. Specimens have also been found in Belize. It is one of the most common trees of the Tropical dry broadleaf forest, especially in late-succession forests as it is shade-tolerant. It can be found growing at 275–925 metres (902–3,035 ft) in elevation. It typically grows in arroyos or other riparian zones.

== Ecology ==
S. pavoniana flowers in both March and June through August. The pollination syndrome is entomophily (insect-pollinated).

Fruiting occurs mainly from the start of the summer wet season in July. White-headed capuchins (Cebus capucinus) eat the fruit of S. pavoniana, as does Cydia saltitans. Occasionally military macaws (Ara militaris) will also eat the fruit.

The leaf phenology is late-drought deciduous.

The ello sphinx (Erinnyis ello) also feeds on S. pavoniana, and in turn can be parasitized by the braconid wasp Microplitis figueresi.

== Use by humans ==
Besides the seeds selling as novelty items, the Yaqui grate the unpeeled (and unparasitized) seeds turning them into flour which is baked into loaves for feast days. The chuculi-buahuame, or 'bread of hunger,' as it's called, is thought to provide a boost of energy. An American entrepreneur in Havana once tried to sell the flour mixed with chicle to make an energizing gum, but was stopped over concern for accidentally introducing the moth to the island of Cuba.

It is not known if this is a true pharmacological effect or a placebo effect, hoping that the observed jumping vigor of the seeds is transferred. If a true biological effect is taking place, it would be similar to chewing coca leaves or drinking very strong coffee.

== See also ==
- Calindoea trifascialis, a moth that jumps inside a rolled up leaf 'sleeping bag'
- Colliguaja odorifera, a related jumping seed plant
- Emporia melanobasis, the moth that parasitizes Spirostachys africana
- Nanodes tamarisci, acting similarly in the seed of Tamarix
- Neuroterus saltatorius, the California jumping gall wasp
- Sapium biloculare or the Arizona jumping bean, a related plant with jumping seeds
- Spirostachys africana, the jumping seed parasitized by Emporia melanobasis
- Tortricidae, the family of moths containing many of the jumping species
