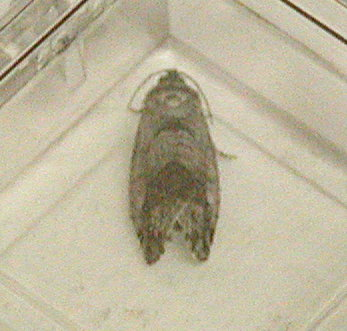
- adult C. saltitans

Scientific classification
- Kingdom: Animalia
- Phylum: Arthropoda
- Class: Insecta
- Order: Lepidoptera
- Family: Tortricidae
- Genus: Cydia
- Species: C. saltitans

Binomial name
- Cydia saltitans (Westwood, 1858)

Synonyms
- Carpocapsa saltitans Westwood, 1858; Carpocapsa deshaisiana Lucas, 1858 (Unav.); Laspeyresia saltitans (Westwood, 1858); Laspeyresia deshaisiana (Lucas, 1858) (Unav.); Cydia deshaisiana (Lucas, 1858) (Unav.)

= Cydia saltitans =

Species of moth

Cydia saltitans or jumping bean moth is a moth from Mexico that is most widely known as its larva, where it inhabits the carpels of seeds from several related shrubby trees, mainly Sebastiania pavoniana or Sapium biloculare (syn. Pleradenophora bilocularis). These seeds are commonly known as Mexican jumping beans.

The moth lays the egg on the young capsule. The hatched larva gnaws into the fruit, which closes the minute hole during its growth. The larva attaches itself to the capsule with many silken threads by hooks on its anal and four hind abdominal prolegs. When the fruit is warmed, for instance by being held in the palm of the hand, the larva twitches, pulling on the threads and causing the characteristic hop. "Jump" is often an exaggeration, but the beans nonetheless do move around quite a bit.

The larva may live for months inside the fruit with periods of inactivity. It eats away the seed inside the capsule, making a hollow for itself. If the fruit is cut, the larva will repair the hole with silk.

If the larva has suitable conditions such as moisture, it will live long enough to go into a pupal stage. In preparation for this, it eats a circular hole through the shell and closes it again with a silken plug. This is to enable the jawless adult moth to escape from the fruit. After completion of the exit hole, it spins a cocoon within the fruit, with a passageway leading to the opening. During the following pupal stage, the larva will not move any more. Normally in the spring, the moth will force its way out of what remains of the fruit, through the round "trapdoor", leaving behind the pupal casing.

The small, jawless silver and gray-colored moth will live for only a few days.

== Nomenclature ==
In most of the historical literature prior to 2020, the name of this species is given as deshaisiana and attributed to Lucas, 1858. However, careful examination of the source literature revealed that Lucas' name has never been available (a nomen nudum under the ICZN rules), and also that Westwood's original name, Carpocapsa saltitans, had evidently been introduced earlier in that same year (Westwood's first appeared in July 1858 and Lucas' in November). Westwood coined the name using elements referring to the behavior; carpo and capsa indicating that it lives within a seed (see podocarp), and saltitans referring to its jumping behavior.

== Gallery ==
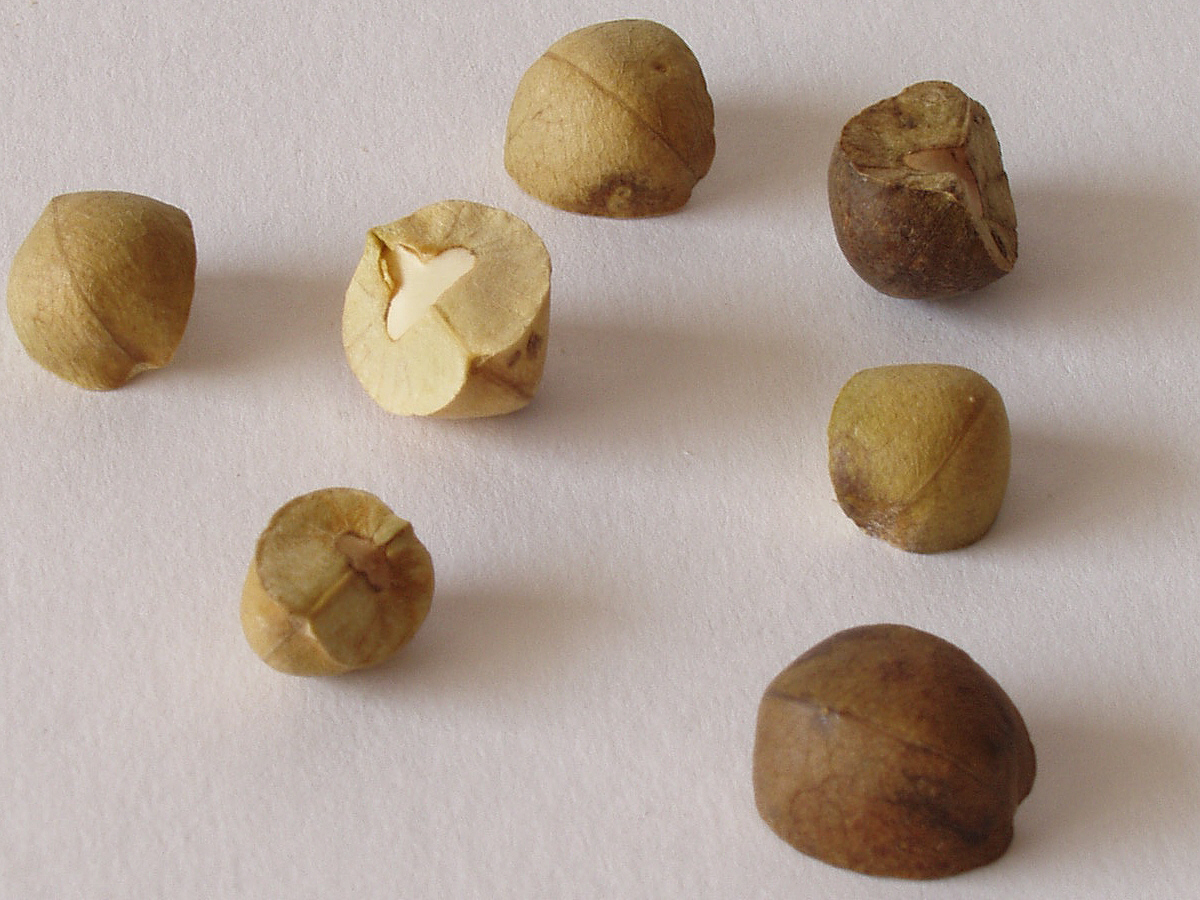
Mexican jumping beans jump to prevent dryness

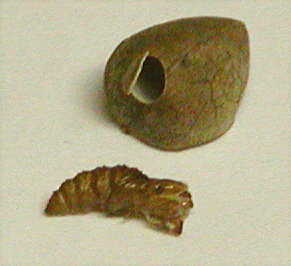
Bean showing "trap door", pupal casing

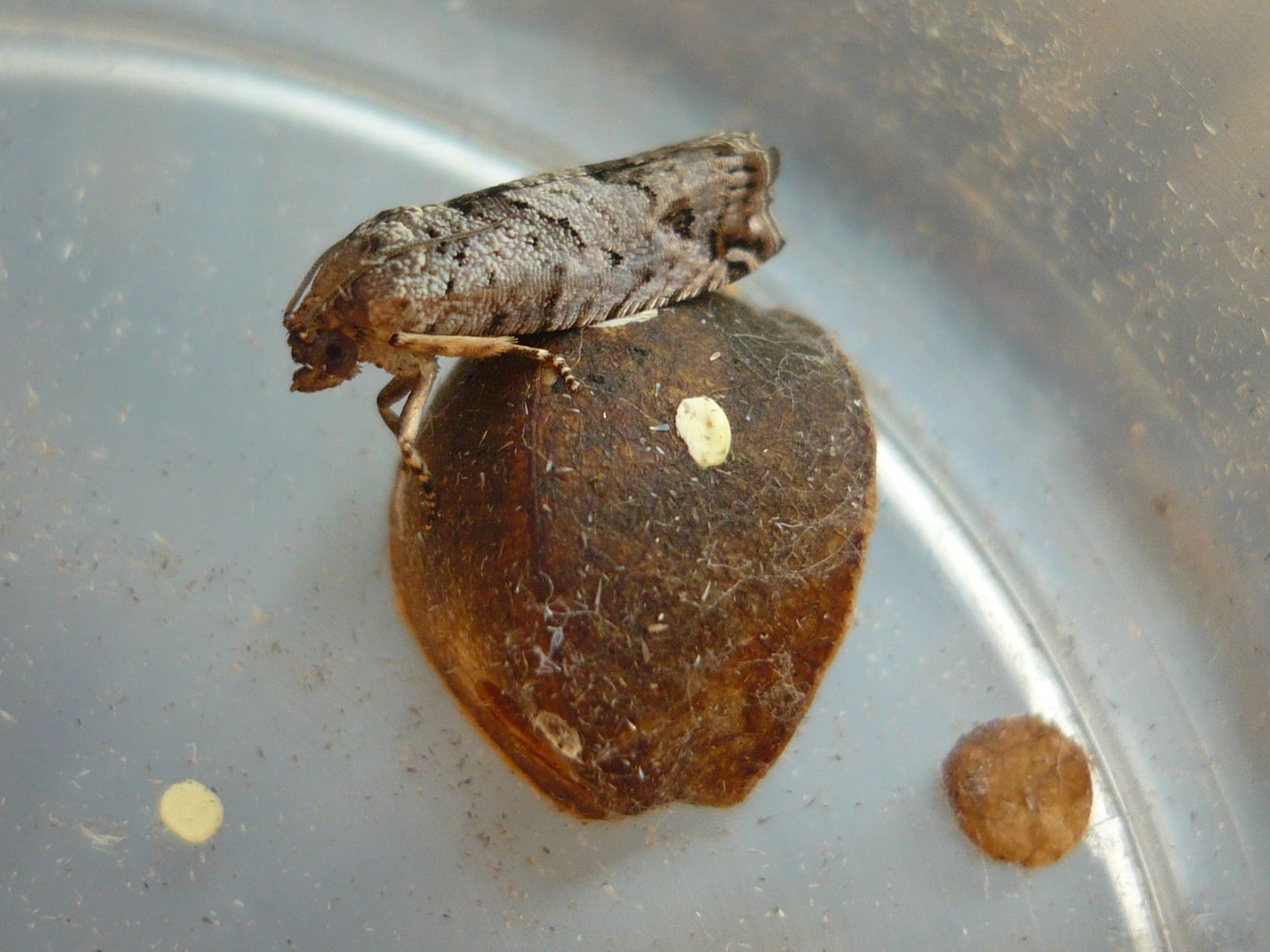
The bean and its moth

== See also ==
- Colliguaja odorifera, a related jumping seed plant
- Emporia melanobasis, a moth with similar habits, parasitizing in Spirostachys africana.
- the California jumping gall wasp (Neuroterus saltatorius) shows similar behavior in galls produced in several oak species, although during the pupal stage.
- Spirostachys africana, the jumping seed parasitized by Emporia melanobasis
- Tortricidae, the family of moths containing many of the jumping species
