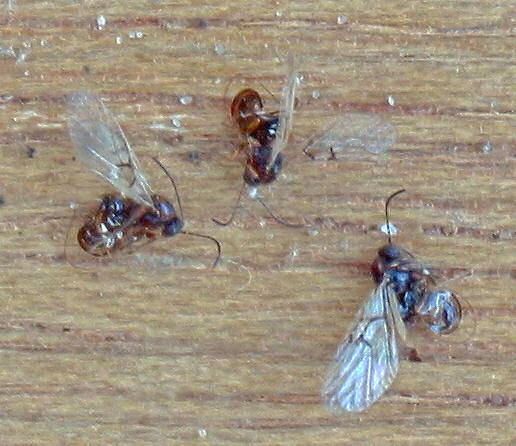
- Neuroterus albipes

Scientific classification
- Kingdom: Animalia
- Phylum: Arthropoda
- Class: Insecta
- Order: Hymenoptera
- Family: Cynipidae
- Tribe: Cynipini
- Genus: Neuroterus; Hartig, 1840

Species
- Many; see text

Synonyms
- Spathegaster Hartig, 1840; Trichagalma Mayr, 1907

= Neuroterus =

Genus of wasps

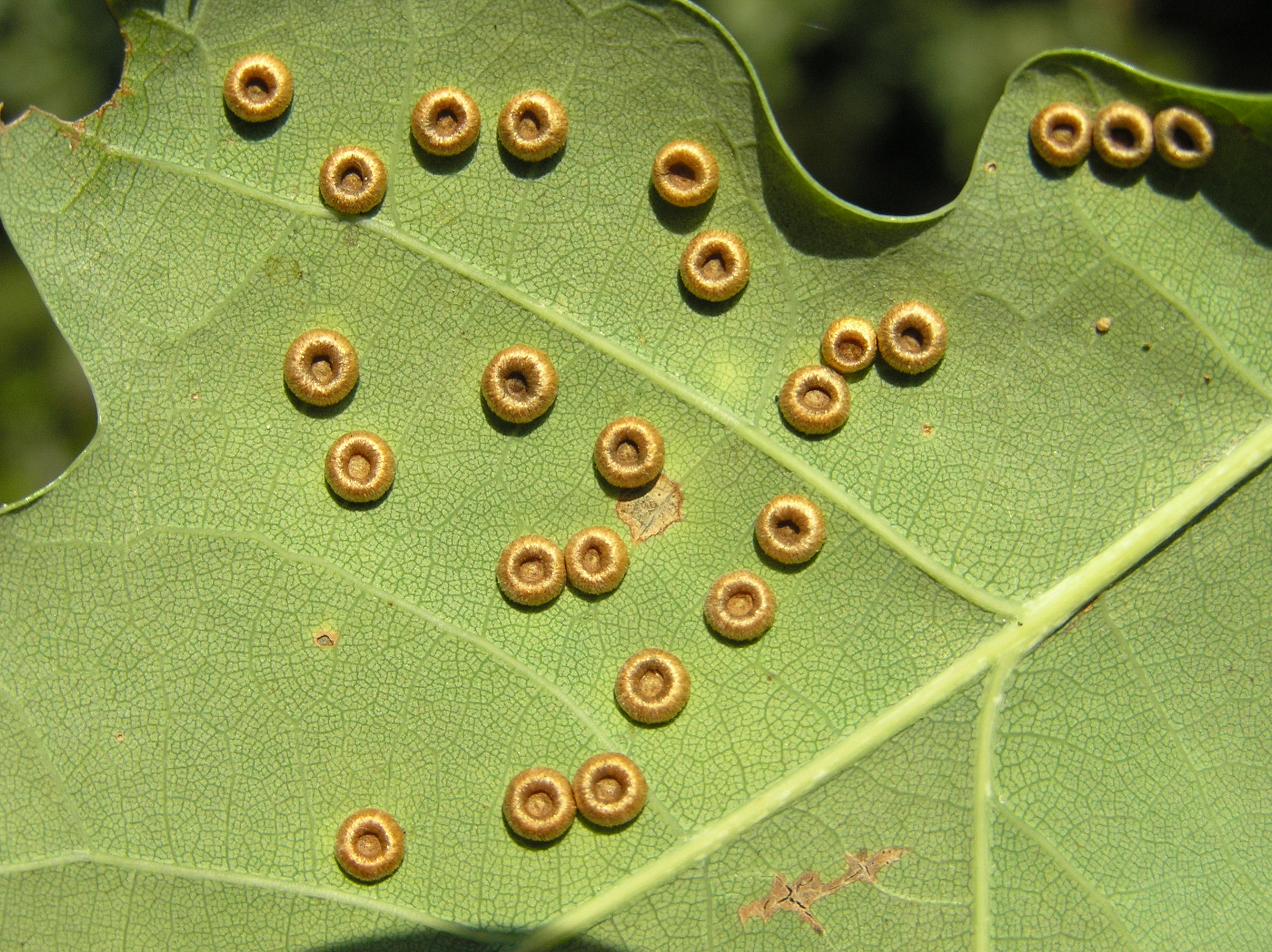
The galls of Neuroterus numismalis parthenogenetic generation on Quercus robur leaf

Neuroterus is a genus of gall wasps that induce galls on oaks in which the wasp larvae live and feed. Some species produce galls that fall off the host plant and 'jump' along the ground due to the movement of the larvae within.

Neuroterus saltatorius—formerly named Cynips saltatorius—produces such Mexican jumping bean-like jumping galls about 1 to 1.5 mm in diameter.

This genus was first described by Theodor Hartig in 1840. Like most oak gall wasps, Neuroterus species have two generations each year, one sexual and one asexual (or agamic). The galls induced by each generation of the same species are usually produced on different parts of the host plant.

Recent studies indicate this genus is poly- or paraphyletic, thus many species will likely be moved to other genera.

Species include:

- Neuroterus acrotrichias Pujade-Villar, 2017
- Neuroterus affinis (Bassett, 1881)
- Neuroterus aggregatus (Wachtl, 1880)
- Neuroterus albipes (Schenck, 1863)
- Neuroterus ambrusi Melika, Stone & Csoka, 1999
- Neuroterus alexandrae Nicholls & Melika, 2021
- Neuroterus aliceae Melika, Nicholls & Stone, 2021
- Neuroterus anthracinus (Curtis, 1838)
- Neuroterus aprilinus Giraud, 1859
- Neuroterus archboldi Melika & Abrahamson, 1997
- Neuroterus argentatus Weld, 1944
- Neuroterus asymmetricus (Kinsey, 1922)
- Neuroterus bassettii Bassett, 1890
- Neuroterus bussae Melika & Nicholls, 2021
- Neuroterus cerrifloralis Mullner, 1901
- Neuroterus chapmanii Melika & Abrahamson, 1997
- Neuroterus chinanteco Pujade-Villar & Clark, 2023
- Neuroterus christi Melika & Abrahamson, 1997
- Neuroterus chrysolepis Lyon, 1984
- Neuroterus clarkeae Beutenmüller, 1910
- Neuroterus clavensis Weld, 1944
- Neuroterus cockerelli Beutmüller?, ?
- Neuroterus congregatus Gillette, 1893
- Neuroterus consimilis Bassett, 1900
- Neuroterus contortus (Weld, 1921)
- Neuroterus distortus Bassett, 1900
- Neuroterus dubius Bassett, 1900
- Neuroterus ellongatum Pujade-Villar & Melika, 2014
- Neuroterus elvisi Medianero & Nieves-Aldrey, 2017
- Neuroterus engelmanni Kinsey, 1922
- Neuroterus escharensis Weld, 1926
- Neuroterus eugeros Pujade-Villar, 2018
- Neuroterus evanescens Kinsey, 1922
- Neuroterus evolutus Weld, 1926
- Neuroterus exiguus Bassett, 1900
- Neuroterus floccosus (Bassett, 1881)
- Neuroterus floricola Kinsey, 1923
- Neuroterus floricomus Weld, 1957
- Neuroterus florulentus Weld, 1957
- Neuroterus fragilis Bassett, 1900 (succulent gall wasp)
- Neuroterus fugiens Weld, 1926
- Neuroterus fusifex Pujade-Villar & Ferrer-Suay, 2016
- Neuroterus gillettei Bassett, 1900
- Neuroterus glandiphilus Medianero & Nieves-Aldrey, 2017
- Neuroterus howertoni Bassett, 1890
- Neuroterus haasi (Kieffer, 1904)
- Neuroterus junctor Kinsey, 1938
- Neuroterus lamellae Weld, 1957
- Neuroterus lanuginosus Giraud, 1859
- Neuroterus laurifoliae Ashmead, 1887
- Neuroterus minutulus Giraud, 1859
- Neuroterus minutus (Bassett, 1881)
- Neuroterus nervus Pujade-Villar & Bravo-Cuautle, 2025
- Neuroterus niger Gillette, 1888
- Neuroterus numismalis (Fourcroy, 1785)
- Neuroterus oblongifoliae Nicholls, Stone & Melika, 2021
- Neuroterus obtectus (Wachtl, 1880)
- Neuroterus pallidus Beutenmüller, 1910
- Neuroterus papillosus Beutenmüller, 1910
- Neuroterus pattersoni Kinsey, 1923
- Neuroterus perminimus Bassett, 1900
- Neuroterus politus Hartig, 1840
- Neuroterus pseudostreus (Kustenmacher, 1894)
- Neuroterus pulchrigalla Medianero & Nieves-Aldrey, 2017
- Neuroterus punctatus Bignell, 1892
- Neuroterus quaili Melika, Nicholls & Stone, 2021
- Neuroterus quercicola Dalla Torre, 1892
- Neuroterus quercusbaccarum (Linnaeus, 1758)
- Neuroterus quercusbatatus (Fitch, 1859)
- Neuroterus quercusirregularis (Osten Sacken, 1861)
- Neuroterus quercusminutissimus Kinsey, 1923
- Neuroterus quercusverrucarum (Osten Sacken, 1861)
- Neuroterus reconditus Kinsey, 1938
- Neuroterus rileyi Kinsey, 1920
- Neuroterus rosieae Melika, Nicholls & Stone, 2021
- Neuroterus sadlerensis Weld, 1926
- Neuroterus saliens (Kollar, 1857)
- Neuroterus saltarius Weld, 1926
- Neuroterus saltatorius (Edwards, 1874) (jumping gall wasp)
- Neuroterus serratae
- Neuroterus stonei Melika & Nicholls, 2021
- Neuroterus tantulus Weld, 1952
- Neuroterus tectus Bassett, 1900
- Neuroterus titou Pujade-Villar & Hanson, 2021
- Neuroterus tricolor (Hartig, 1841)
- Neuroterus tumba Kinsey, 1938
- Neuroterus umbilicatus Bassett, 1900
- Neuroterus valhalla Brandão-Dias, Zhang, Pirro, Vinson, Weinersmith, Ward, Forbes & Egan, 2022
- Neuroterus varians Kinsey, 1920
- Neuroterus verrucum Pujade-Villar, 2014
- Neuroterus vesicula (Bassett, 1881)
- Neuroterus virgens Gillette, 1893
- Neuroterus visibilis Kinsey, 1938
- Neuroterus volutans Kinsey, 1938
- Neuroterus vulpinus Kinsey, 1938
- Neuroterus weldi Melika & Abrahamson, 1997
- Neuroterus washingtonensis (Beutenmüller, 1913)
