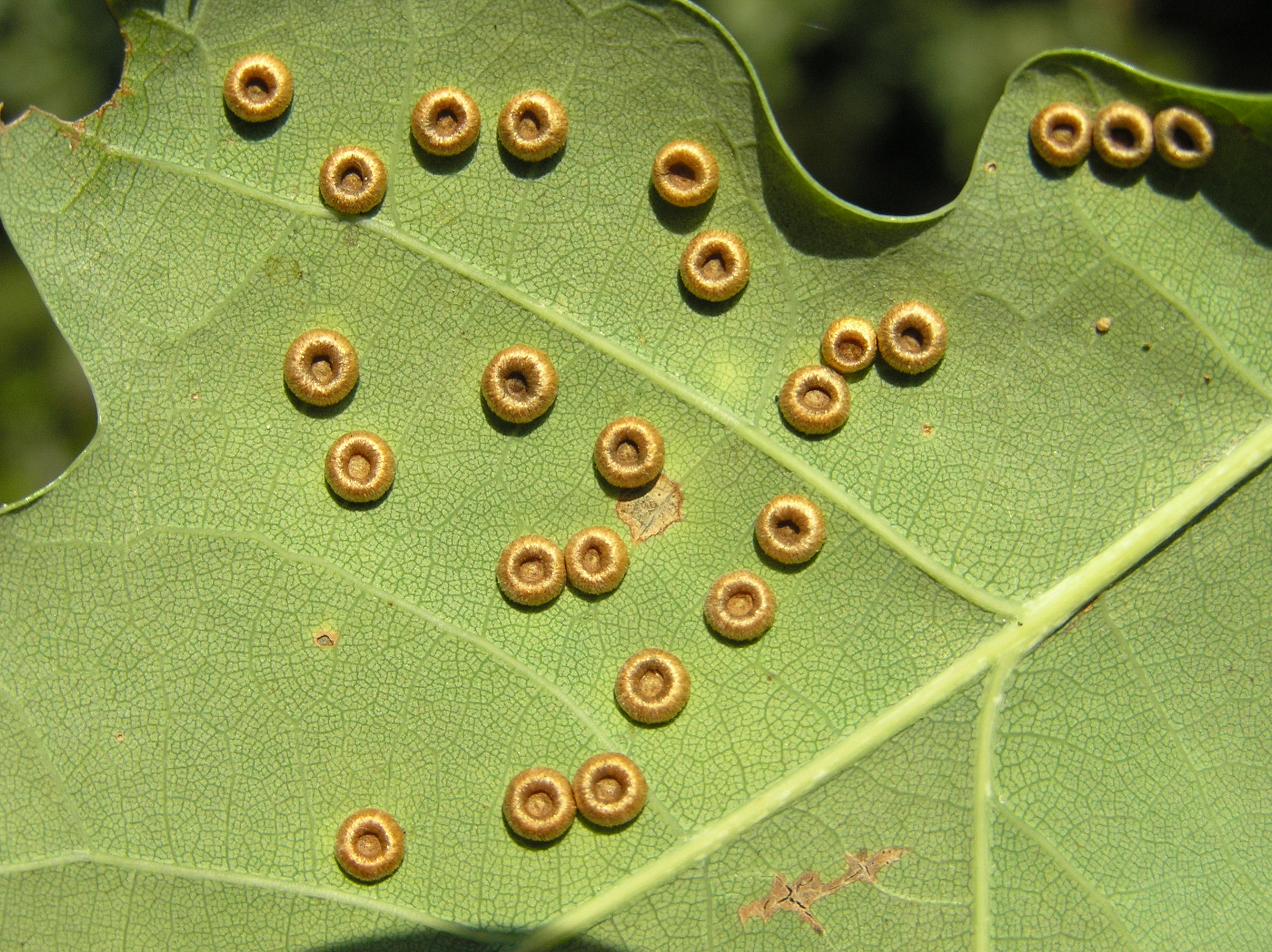
- Silk button gall on pedunculate oak

Scientific classification
- Kingdom: Animalia
- Phylum: Arthropoda
- Class: Insecta
- Order: Hymenoptera
- Family: Cynipidae
- Genus: Neuroterus
- Species: N. numismalis

Binomial name
- Neuroterus numismalis Geoffroy in Fourcroy, 1785

= Neuroterus numismalis =

Species of wasp

Neuroterus numismalis is a gall wasp that forms chemically induced leaf galls on oak trees. It has both bisexual and agamic (parthenogenetic) generations and forms two distinct galls on oak leaves, the silk button gall and blister gall. The galls can be very numerous with more than a thousand per leaf.

== Synonyms ==
Neuroterus reaumuri, N. vesicator, Spathegaster vesicatrix, Cynips numismalis, and C. quercus-tiarae are previous binomials found in the literature.

== Physical appearance ==
=== Galls ===
This silk button spangle gall has a cover of golden hairs that give the impression of silk thread. The 0.3 cm button-shaped galls have a pronounced concavity and sit tightly against the leaf lamina.

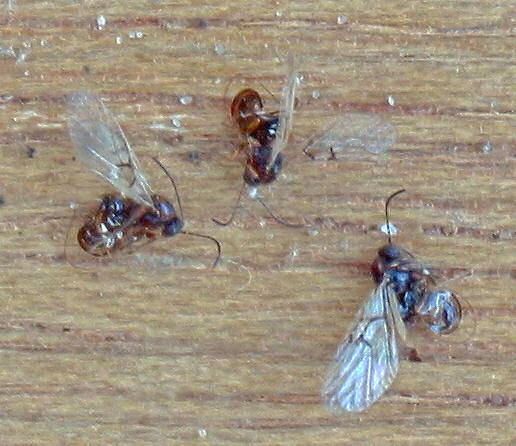
The similar gall wasp N. albipes

Blister galls are about 0.3 cm in diameter and green or greyish in colour; well camouflaged with the leaf lamina. The gall has narrow ridges running downwards on all sides from a central papilla on the upper surface and sometimes on the lower surface as well. Both galls are both unilocular and unilarval.

=== Gall wasp ===
The female wasp of the bisexual generation is about 1.8–2.4 mm in length; largely brown in colour with clear wings and hairy legs. The male is also winged and slightly shorter than the female.

The agamic generation consists of only female wasps which measure approximately 2.5 mm in length. The pointed head is black, with pale brown eyes and long clear wings are present with dark brown veins and hairs.

== Life cycle ==
=== Agamic generation ===
In late summer the agamic generation develops in the circular, golden brown, raised, and disc-shaped structure, known as a 'silk button spangle gall'. The gall increase in size even after they fall to the ground in autumn, this being achieved by cell enlargement rather than through further cell division. The gall wasp that causes the agamic generation was previously named as N. vesicator until the two generational status of the species was understood.

=== Bisexual generation ===
After having overwintered on the ground the females emerge from the silk button gall in early spring and the lay their parthenogenetic (unfertilised) eggs in expanding oak leaf buds, forming the so-called 'blister gall.' This second N. numismalis gall is located on the leaf blade as a structure which forms a convexity protruding from both the upper and lower lamina

The blister galls produce the males and females of the bisexual generation in mid-summer and the fertilised eggs result in the silk button gall generation.

== Inquilines and parasites ==
The spangle gall generation in particular is affected by inquilines and parasites. Synergus albipes is an inquiline on the blister gall, while common hyperparasites include Aulogymnus arsames, Aprostocetus aethiops, Eurytoma brunniventris, Mesopolobus fasciiventris, M. fuscipes, M. sericeus, M. tibialis and Torymus flavipes.

Silk button galls also have Synergus albipes as an inquiline and examples of hyperparasites include; Aulogymnus gallarum, Mesopolobus fasciventris, M. tibialis, Pediobius lysis and Torymus flavipes.

== See also ==
- Knopper gall
- Oak marble gall
- Neuroterus quercusbaccarum
- Neuroterus albipes
- Neuroterus anthracinus
