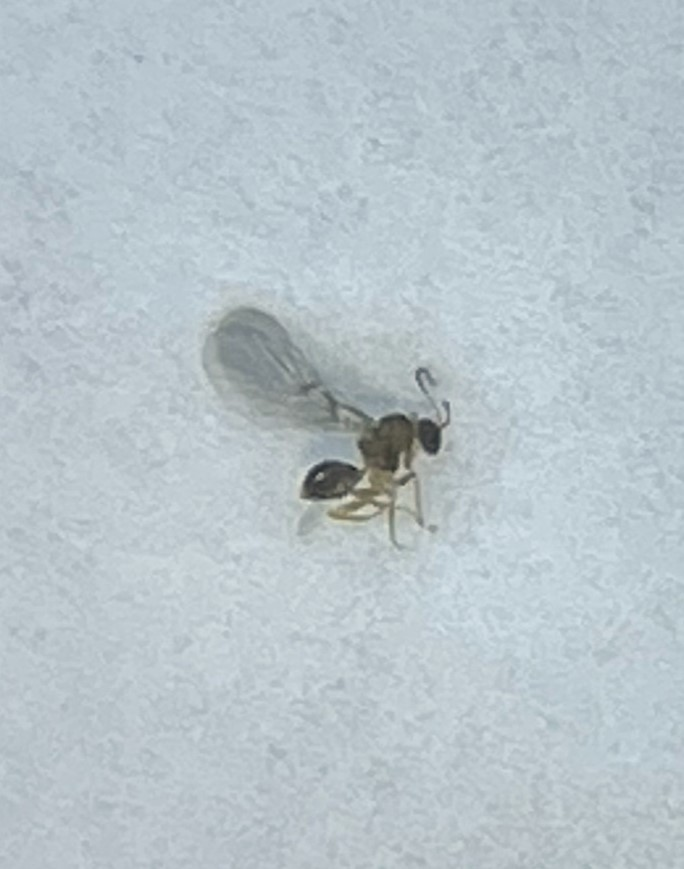
- Adult male Neuroterus fragilis

Scientific classification
- Kingdom: Animalia
- Phylum: Arthropoda
- Class: Insecta
- Order: Hymenoptera
- Family: Cynipidae
- Genus: Neuroterus
- Species: N. fragilis

Binomial name
- Neuroterus fragilis Bassett, 1900

= Neuroterus fragilis =

Species of wasp

Neuroterus fragilis, also known as the succulent gall wasp, is a species of oak gall wasp. It induces galls in oak trees in California, including leather oak, California scrub oak, blue oak, and valley oak. Adults are small, 0.7–1.2 millimetres (0.028–0.047 in), with yellow legs. The galls it induces are 10–30 millimetres (0.39–1.18 in), and present as swellings of the petioles and midribs of oak leaves. In this species of oak gall wasp, only the spring bisexual generation, consisting of both males and females, is known. However, an all-female parthenogenic generation in summer, which most oak gall wasps have, is possible.

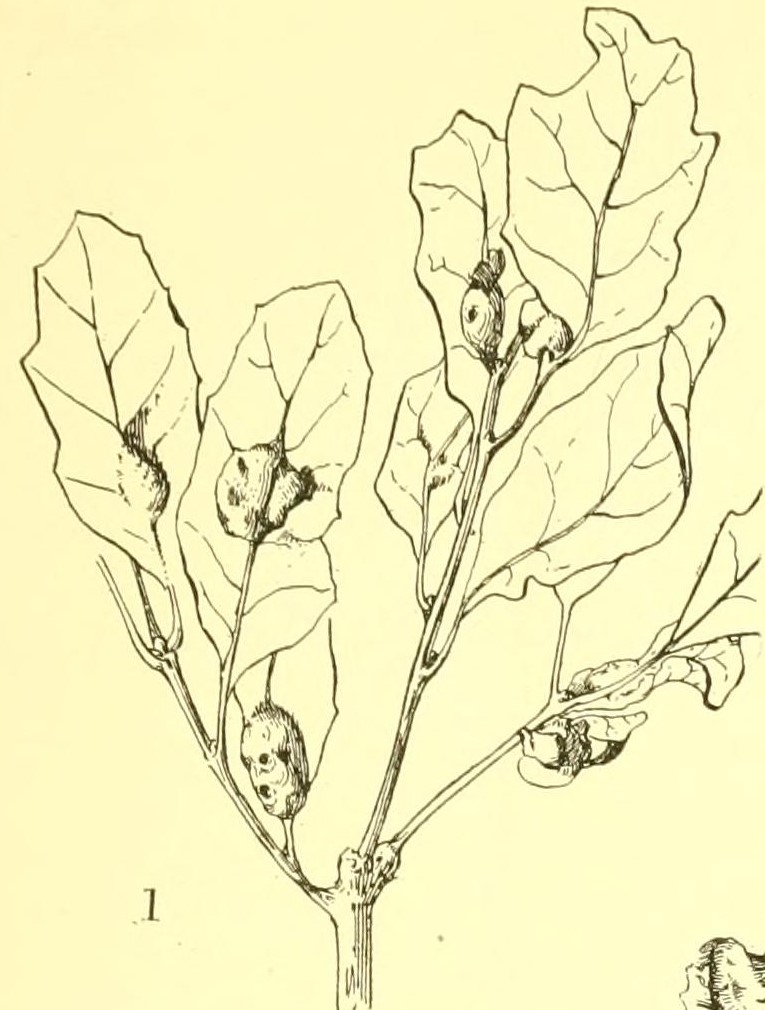
An illustration of N. fragilis galls by Edna Libby Beutenmüller
