= Neuroterus valhalla =

Scientific classification
- Kingdom: Animalia
- Phylum: Arthropoda
- Clade: Pancrustacea
- Class: Insecta
- Order: Hymenoptera
- Family: Cynipidae
- Genus: Neuroterus
- Species: N. valhalla

Binomial name
- Neuroterus valhalla Brandão-Dias, Zhang, Pirro, Vinson, Weinersmith, Ward, Forbes & Egan, 2022

Species of insect

Neuroterus valhalla is a species of gall wasp from North America that forms galls on the southern live oak (Quercus virginiana). It was first discovered on the campus of Rice University and was named for the campus pub.

This species of gall wasp produces a chemical which in turn manipulates the host tree into providing for the wasp eggs. The tree does this by providing a protective layer around the eggs and nutrition for the larva.
