= Emporia (moth) =

Scientific classification
- Domain: Eukaryota
- Kingdom: Animalia
- Phylum: Arthropoda
- Class: Insecta
- Order: Lepidoptera
- Family: Pyralidae
- Subfamily: Phycitinae
- Genus: Emporia; Ragonot, 1887

Synonyms
- Emposia Carus, 1888

Genus of moths

Emporia is a genus of snout moths. It was described by Ragonot in 1887, and is known to hail from South Africa.

== Species ==
- Emporia grisescens Ragonot, 1887
- Emporia melanobasis Balinsky, 1991
