= William Beutenmuller =

U.S. entomologist (1864–1934)

William Beutenmuller (March 31, 1864 - February 24, 1934), was an American entomologist who served as curator of entomology at the American Museum of Natural History (1888-1912), editor of the Journal of the New York Entomological Society (1893-1903), and president of the New York Entomological Society (1900). He published numerous scientific articles on many insect groups, including beetles, flies, gall wasps, and butterflies and moths.

Beutenmuller was born in Hoboken, New Jersey, and attended school in New York. He was married to scientific illustrator Edna Hyatt. He lived his later years in Tenafly, New Jersey, and died of heart disease at Englewood Hospital in 1934.
