= Emporia grisescens =

Scientific classification
- Domain: Eukaryota
- Kingdom: Animalia
- Phylum: Arthropoda
- Class: Insecta
- Order: Lepidoptera
- Family: Pyralidae
- Genus: Emporia
- Species: E. grisescens

Binomial name
- Emporia grisescens Ragonot, 1887

Species of moth

Emporia grisescens is a species of snout moth in the genus Emporia. It was described by Ragonot in 1887. It is found in Tunisia.
