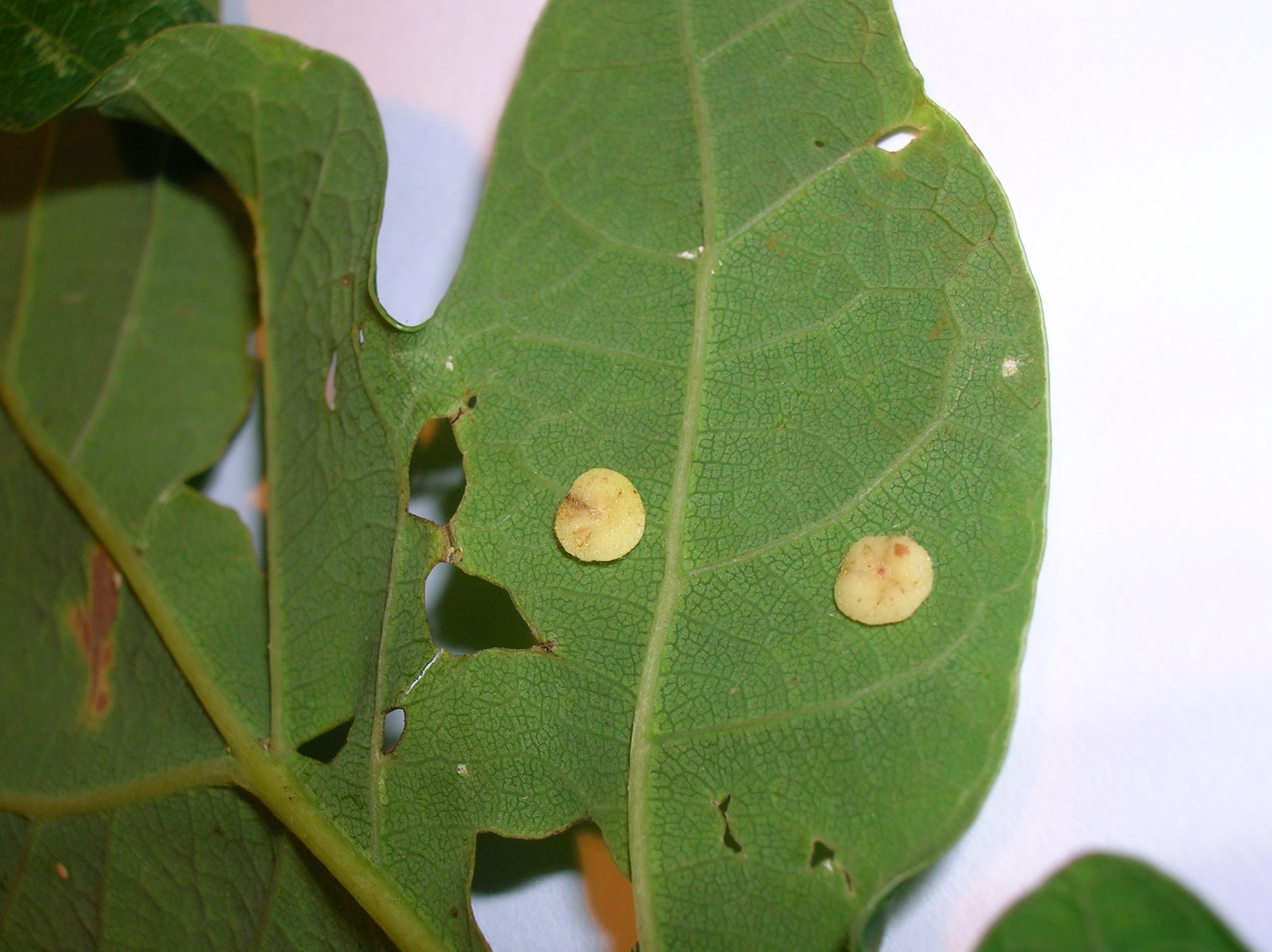
- Smooth spangle gall on pedunculate oak

Scientific classification
- Domain: Eukaryota
- Kingdom: Animalia
- Phylum: Arthropoda
- Class: Insecta
- Order: Hymenoptera
- Family: Cynipidae
- Genus: Neuroterus
- Species: N. albipes

Binomial name
- Neuroterus albipes Schenck, 1863

= Neuroterus albipes =

Species of wasp

Neuroterus albipes is a gall wasp that forms chemically induced leaf galls on oak trees which has both bisexual and agamic generations and therefore forms two distinct galls, the smooth spangle gall and Schenck's gall. Neuroterus laeviusculus and Spathegaster albipes are previous binomials found in the literature.

== Galls ==
The normally cream coloured saucer of the smooth spangle gall has a small cone elevated in its centre, a pronounced rim and they are sometimes found almost folded in two. The gall may have streaks of purple, red or other colours through it. Typically found on the lower surface, this gall is found more often on the upper surface than other spangle galls and although often grouped together, the numbers on each leaf are far fewer than in species such as Neuroterus quercusbaccarum. The gall is observed to swell appreciably once it has detached and fallen in late autumn. The gall has also been recorded as green, purple, red or pink.

Schenck's gall is an oval-shaped structure, about 0.1 × 0.2 cm and a light green colour, well camouflaged with the leaf lamina. A distinct indentation of the lamina margin is apparent through the inhibition of the normal growth of the leaf by the developing gall; the gall may also appear on the midrib.

Both galls are both unilocular and unilarval.

== Life cycle ==
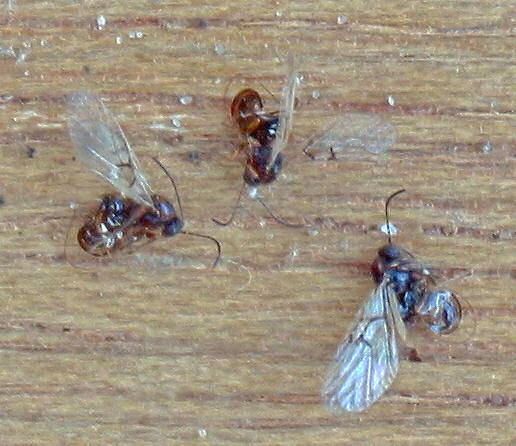
The gall wasp N. albipes

=== Agamic generation ===
Emerging in spring the female of the agamic generation develops in the discus-shaped structure about 0.4 cm across, known as a 'Smooth Spangle gall'. The gall falls to the ground in autumn, having developed in June or July of the previous summer.

=== Bisexual generation ===
The females emerge from the smooth spangle gall in early spring and the lay their unfertilised eggs in oak leaves, usually in the margin of the leaf blades, forming the so-called 'Schenck's gall.' This second N. albipes gall is hairy to start with and smooth later; not all that obvious and growing as a solitary structure. Schenck's gall produces the bisexual generation in mid-summer and the eggs result in the Smooth Spangle gall generation.

== Inquilines ==
The fly Clinodiposis galliperda is often found as an inquiline within the agamic 'smooth spangle gall' generation.

== See also ==
- Neuroterus numismalis
- Neuroterus anthracinus
- Knopper gall
- Oak marble gall
- Oak artichoke gall
