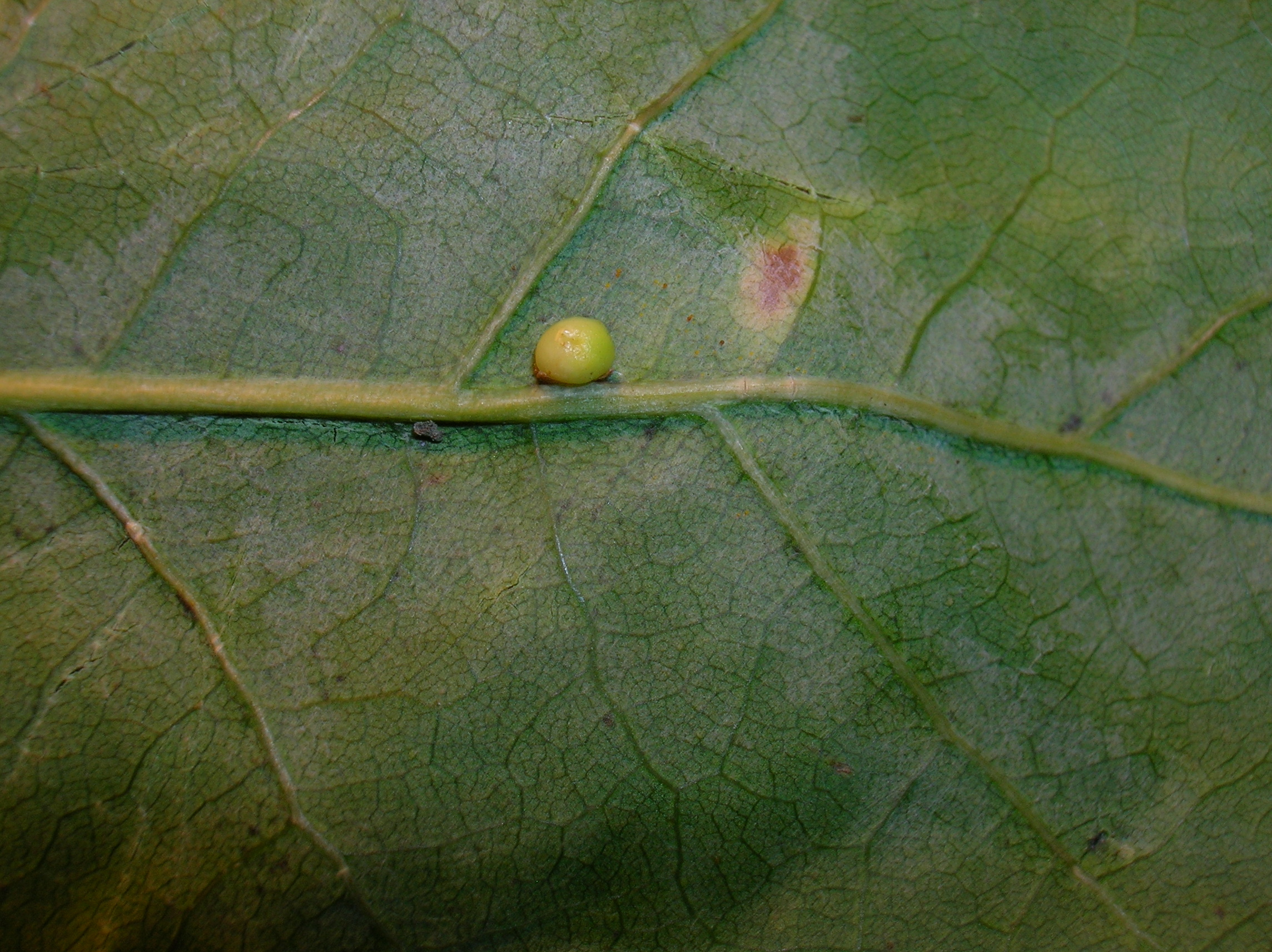
- Oyster gall on pedunculate oak

Scientific classification
- Kingdom: Animalia
- Phylum: Arthropoda
- Class: Insecta
- Order: Hymenoptera
- Family: Cynipidae
- Genus: Neuroterus
- Species: N. anthracinus

Binomial name
- Neuroterus anthracinus (Curtis, 1838)

= Neuroterus anthracinus =

Species of wasp

Neuroterus anthracinus is a widely distributed gall wasp that forms chemically induced leaf galls on oak trees. N. anthracinus has both sexual and agamic generations and in consequence forms two distinct galls, the oyster gall and April-bud gall.

== Synonyms ==
Ameristus Förster 1869, Diplobius Kinsey 1923, Dolichostrophus Ashmead 1887, Neospathogaster Kinsey 1923, Spathegaster Hartig 1840, furunculus Beyerinck 1882, ostreus Giraud 1859, ostria Hartig 1840, Andricus ostreus, Neuroterus schlechtendali and Andricus furunculus are all previous nomenclatures found in the literature.

== Galls ==
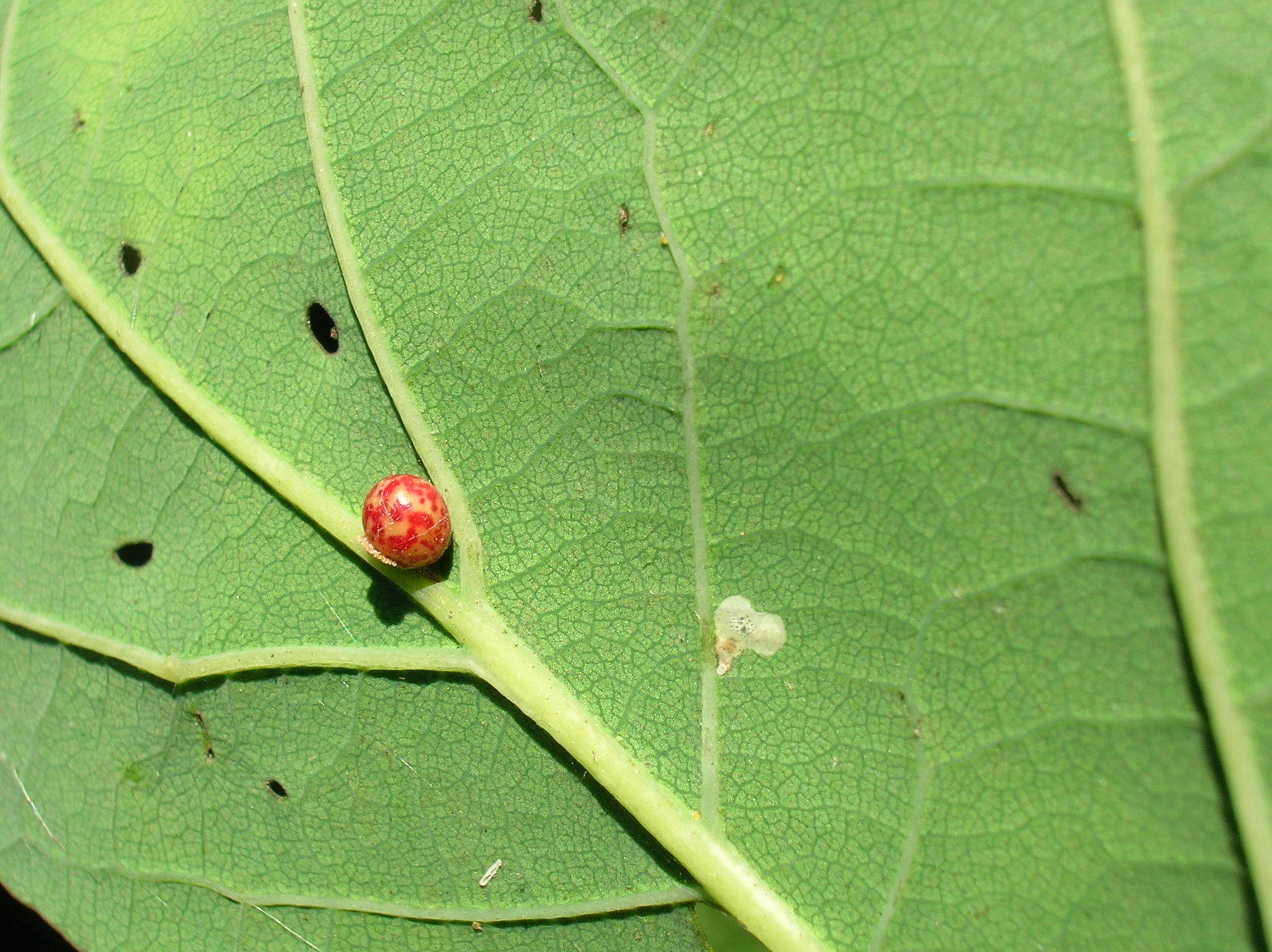
A red spotted example of the gall

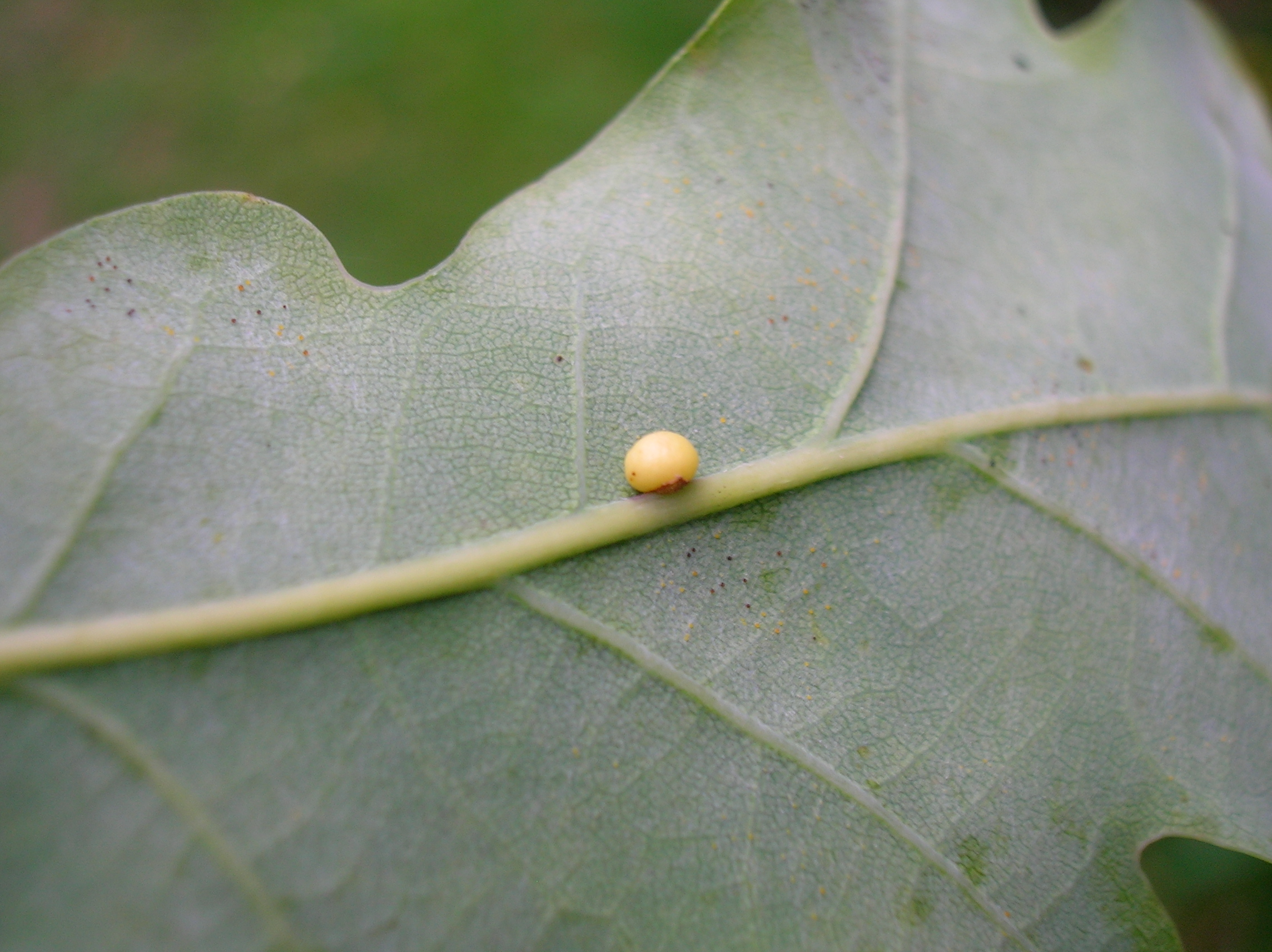
Oyster gall on a Quercus robur leaf

The oyster gall is found on the leaf underside, rarely above, and is around 0.3 cm across, located between the midrib and the lateral veins. It develops under the lower epidermis and when it emerges it has two flaps of valve-like tissue which remain, even after the gall has fallen. The gall has also been recorded as green, brown, pink and even with red spots.

The April-bud gall is of brief duration, the bud swelling and the insect emerging within a week from the smooth and oval 0.8 cm gall, tucked up within the bud scales. The old galls show the escape aperture clearly.

== Life cycle ==
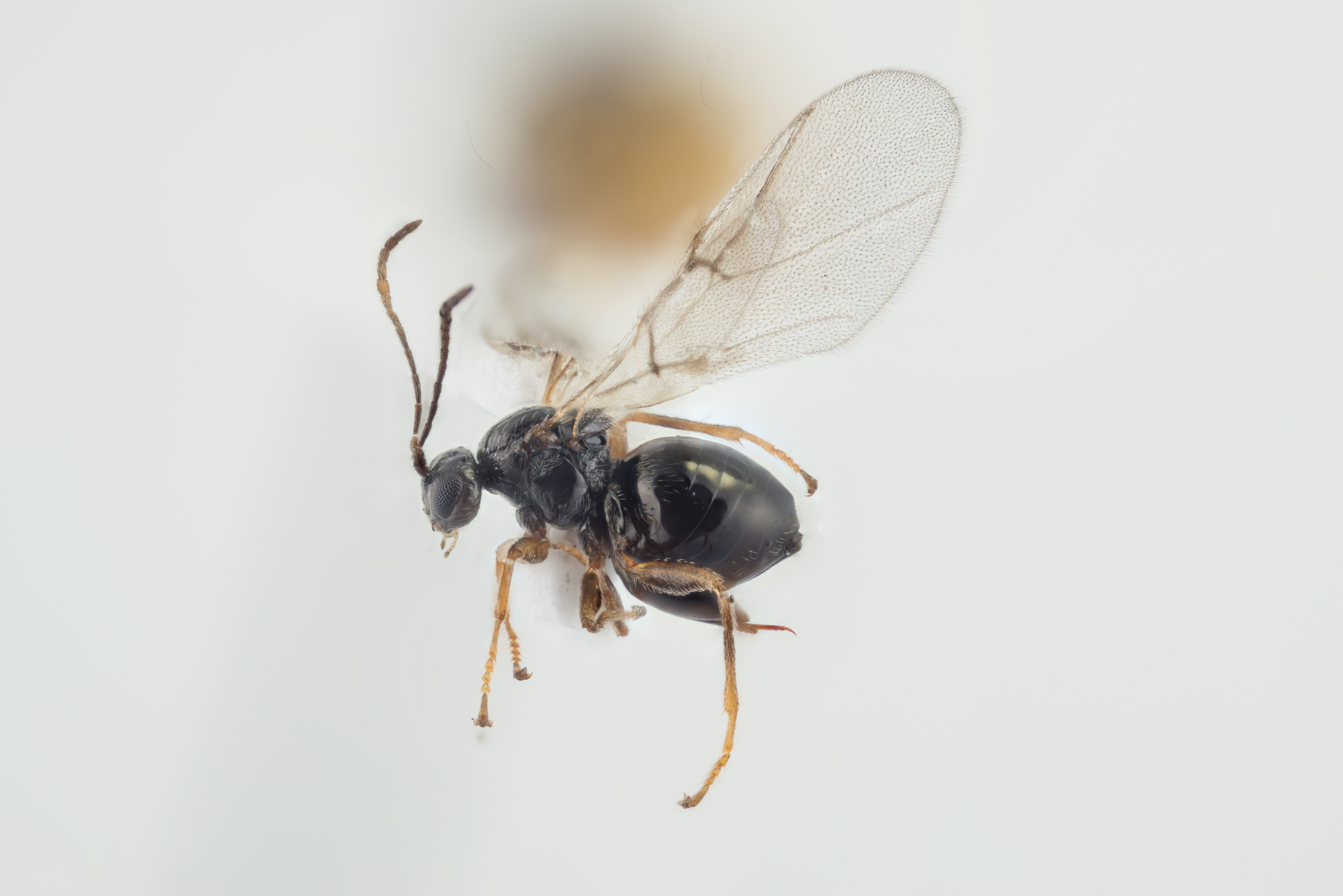
The gall wasp N. anthracinus

=== Agamic generation ===
Emerging in autumn the parthenogenetic female of the agamic generation developed in the unilocular and unilarval bean-shaped structure, which is about 0.8 cm across, known as the 'oyster gall'; they lay eggs within the buds which result in the bisexual generation.

=== Sexual generation ===
The males and females emerge from the unilocular and unilarval April-bud galls in the terminal or axillary buds around May; their fertilised eggs placed in the leaf lamina result in the Oyster gall.

== Parasites and inquilines ==
Several parasites and inquilines are found in both the sexual and agamic phases.

== See also ==
- Neuroterus quercusbaccarum
- Neuroterus numismalis
- Neuroterus albipes
- Oak marble gall
- Oak apple
- Oak artichoke gall
