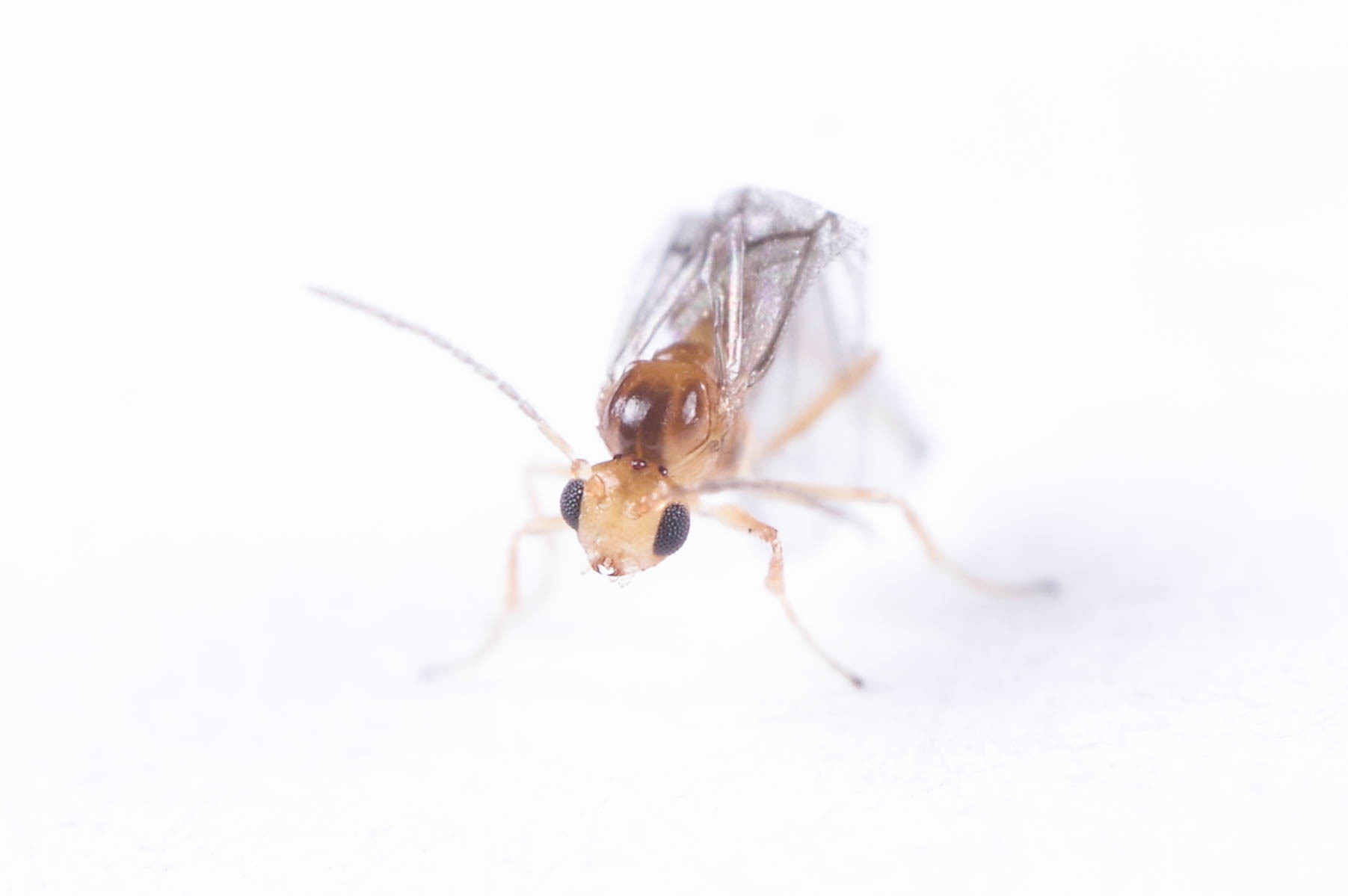
- Adult male Neuroterus saltatorius
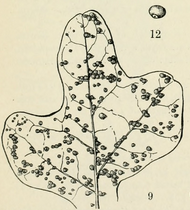
- Illustration by Edna Libby Beutenmüller of the galls induced by parthenogenetic generation of Neuroterus saltatorius

Scientific classification
- Kingdom: Animalia
- Phylum: Arthropoda
- Class: Insecta
- Order: Hymenoptera
- Family: Cynipidae
- Genus: Neuroterus
- Species: N. saltatorius

Binomial name
- Neuroterus saltatorius (Edwards, 1874)

= Neuroterus saltatorius =

Species of wasp

Neuroterus saltatorius, also known as the jumping gall wasp, is a species of oak gall wasp. It is found in North America, where it induces galls on a variety of oak trees, including Oregon oak, valley oak, California scrub oak, blue oak, and leather oak.

Like other oak gall wasps, it has two generations: a bisexual generation, and a parthenogenetic female generation. The all-female generation's galls appear in late spring. These round, 1 mm across galls occur on the underside of leaves, and eventually detach and fall into the leaf litter. Adults emerge early the following spring and lay eggs for the bisexual generation. This generation induces galls that are integral to the leaf.

Adult wasps are .75 millimetres (0.030 in) long, brown and/or black, with reddish legs.

== Jumping behavior ==
Once they have fallen to the ground, the unisexual galls of Neuroterus saltatorius "jump" due to the movements of the larvae inside. A study at University of California, Santa Cruz found this behavior happened during dry weather at temperatures between 20–40 °C (68–104 °F). This behavior might help the galls dig deeper into the leaf litter for protection from the elements or predators.

== Effects on trees and other species ==
The presence of Neuroterus saltatorius does not cause significant damage to their host trees. However, the parthenogenetic generation of galls can damage leaves when in high concentrations. On Quercus garryana, this can potentially have a negative effect on the butterfly Erynnis propertius, whose larvae also feed on Q. garryana leaves.

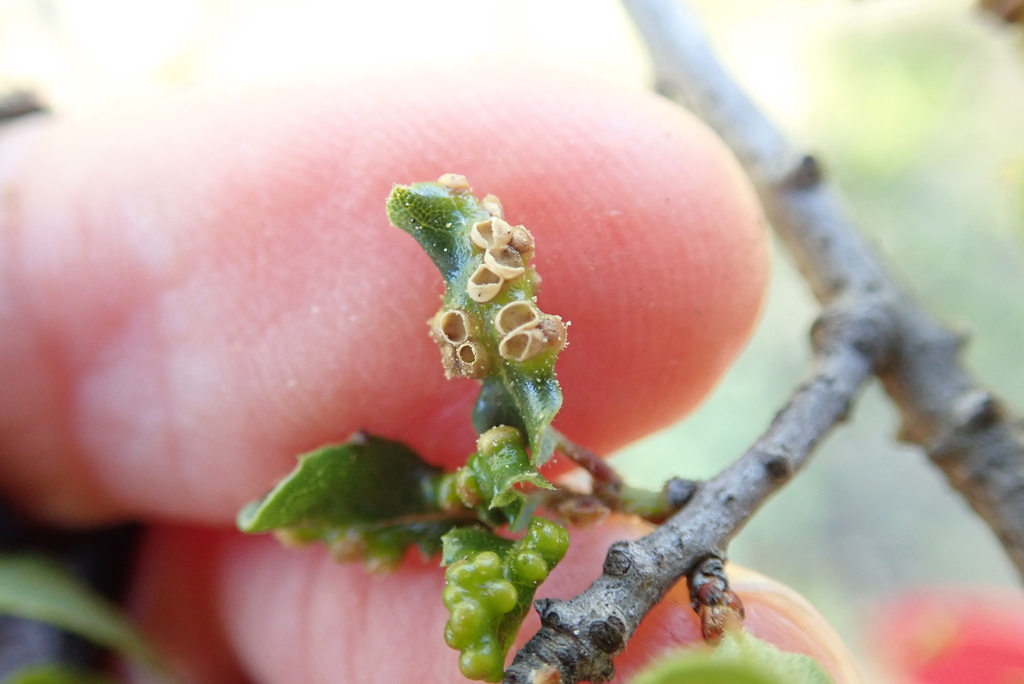
Galls of the bisexual generation
