= Mexican jumping bean =

Seed pods inhabited by a moth larva

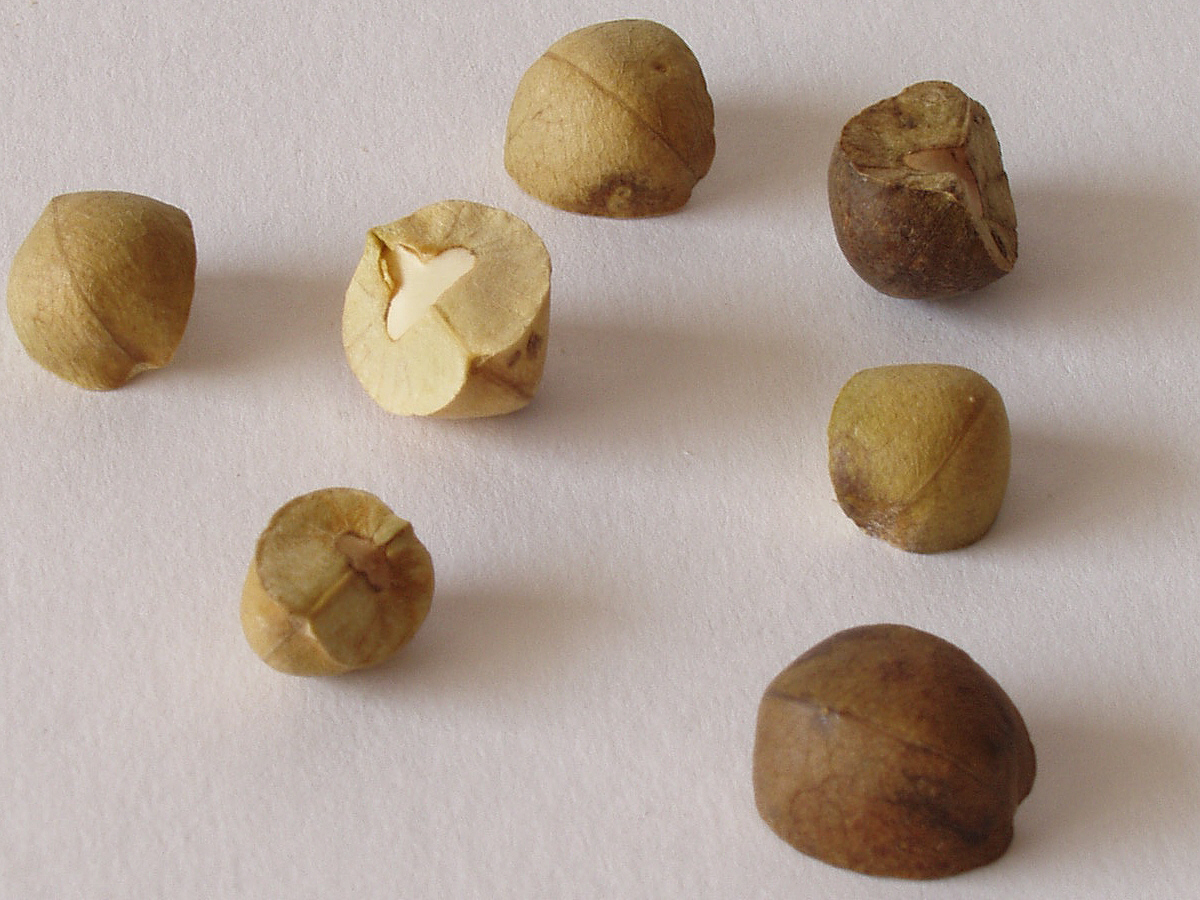
Jumping beans, each about 7 to 10 mm

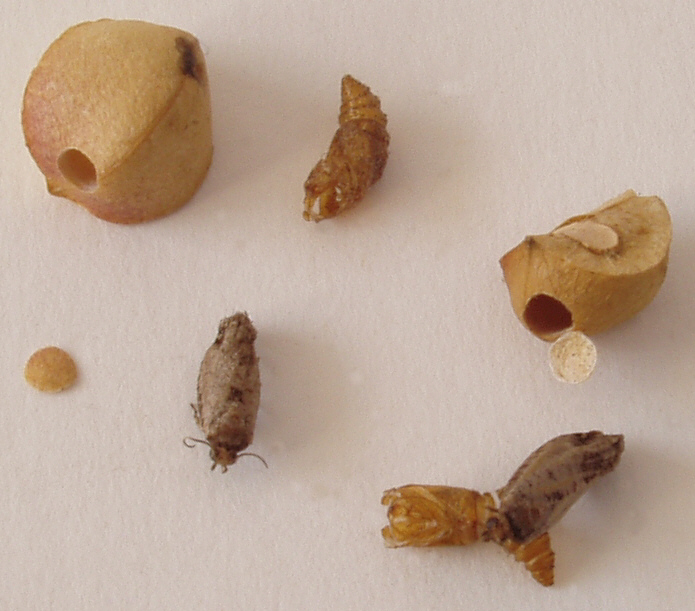
The "trap door" of the jumping bean on the left has been removed, and the one on the right remains attached, next to two moth larvae and their pupal casings.

Mexican jumping beans (Spanish: frijoles saltarines) are seed pods that have been inhabited by the larva of a small moth (Cydia saltitans) and are native to Mexico. The pod is usually tan to brown. They are from the shrub Sebastiania pavoniana, often also referred to as "jumping bean." However, they are not related to actual beans (legume plants), but rather to spurges. The beans are considered non-toxic but are not generally eaten. In the spring, when the shrub is flowering, moths lay their eggs on the shrub's hanging seedpods. When the eggs hatch, tiny larvae bore into the immature green pods and begin to devour the seeds. The pods ripen, fall to the ground and separate into three smaller segments, and those segments are called Mexican jumping beans. As the tiny larvae inside curl up and uncurl, they hit the capsule's wall, and the bean appears to jump. They move more as temperatures rise. The larva eats away the inside of the bean (until it becomes hollow) and attaches itself to the inside of the bean with silk-like thread.

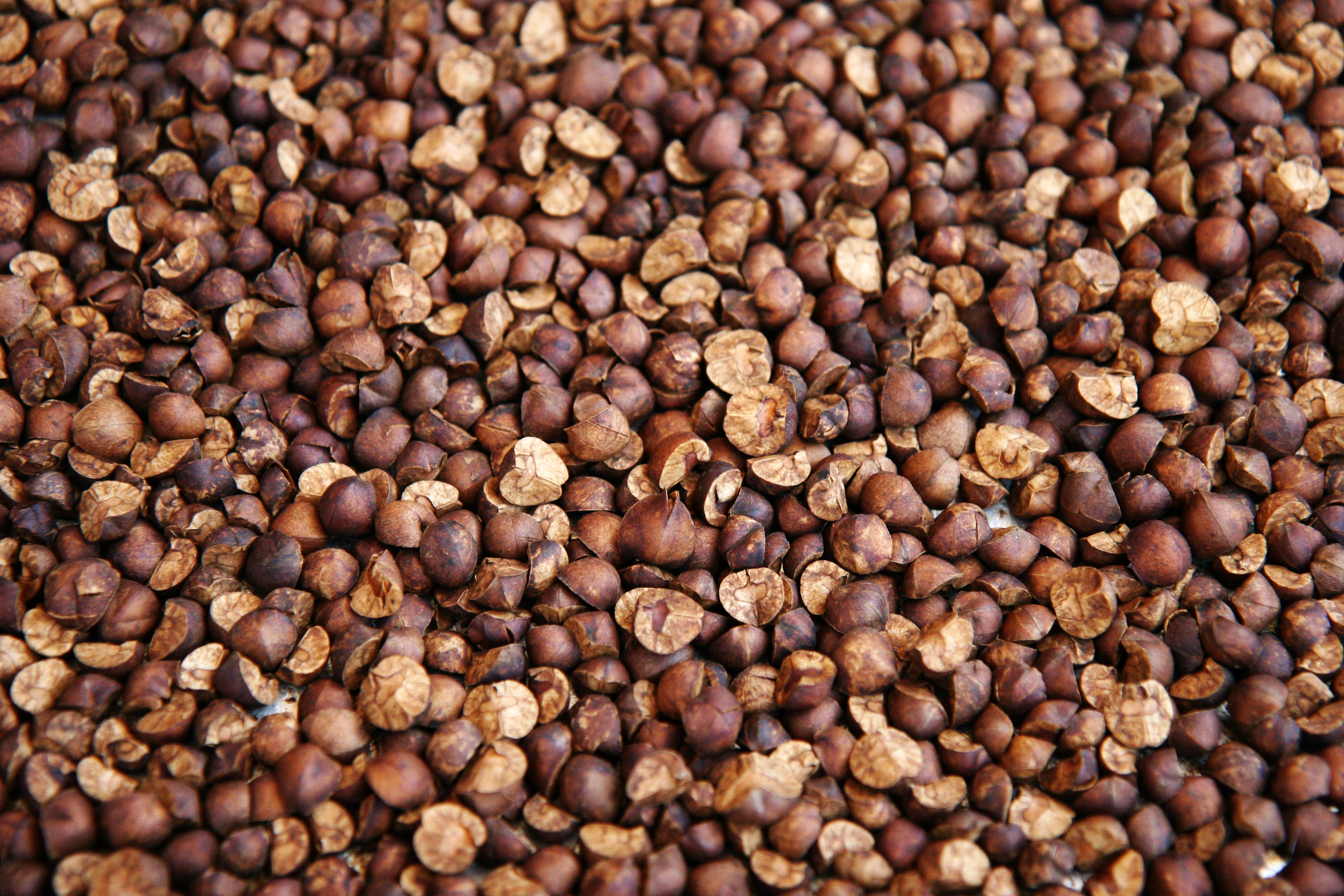
Mexican jumping beans

Physicists at Seattle University theorize, using Brownian motion as a model, that the larva's random walk helps to find shade to survive on hot days. Although it does not optimize for finding shade quickly, the strategy minimizes the chances of never finding shade when shade is sparse.

The larva may live for months inside the bean with varying periods of dormancy. If the larva has adequate conditions of moisture and temperature, it will live long enough to go into a pupal stage. In the spring, the moth forces itself out of the bean through a round "trap door," leaving behind the pupal casing. After its metamorphosis, the small, silver and gray-colored moth lives for no more than a few days.

== Novelty ==
A plastic box of jumping beans sold as a novelty

The beans have long been sold in Mexico as a novelty, where they are known as brincadores. The beans featured in comic books from the 1930s through to the 1950s, and have been sold commercially as novelties in clear plastic boxes containing four or five beans. When the bean is warmed (by being held in the palm of the hand, for example) the larva will move to avoid the heat, pulling on the threads and causing the characteristic hop. According to legend, the first person to sell Mexican Jumping Beans was a 12-year-old boy named Joaquín Hernández, from the town of Álamos in the Mexican state of Sonora, in 1921.

== Sources ==
The Mexican jumping bean comes from the mountains in the states of Sonora, Sinaloa, and Chihuahua. Álamos, Sonora, calls itself the "Jumping Bean Capital of the World." They are in an area approximately 50 by 160 km (31 by 99 mi) where the Sebastiania pavoniana host tree grows. During the spring, moths emerge from last year's beans and deposit their eggs on the flower of the host tree.

== See also ==
- Spirostachys africana, a related plant parasitized by a similar moth
- Emporia melanobasis, the moth parasite of Spirostachys africana
- Sea-Monkeys
- Formicarium
- Mighty Beanz, a plastic toy line in which the toys resemble Mexican jumping beans
