= Emporia melanobasis =

Scientific classification
- Domain: Eukaryota
- Kingdom: Animalia
- Phylum: Arthropoda
- Class: Insecta
- Order: Lepidoptera
- Family: Pyralidae
- Genus: Emporia
- Species: E. melanobasis

Binomial name
- Emporia melanobasis Balinsky, 1991

Species of moth

Emporia melanobasis is a species of snout moth in the genus Emporia. It was described by Boris Balinsky in 1991, and is known from South Africa.

== Jumping beans ==
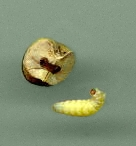
S. africana mericarp with Emporia melanobasis larva

The larvae pupate inside fruit of Spirostachys africana. Larvae develop with the growing fruits which show no external damage. When the fruits are mature each splits into three cocci. The larvae jack-knife inside the fallen segments, causing them to move about erratically and vigorously, to the surprise of the uninitiated. This has led to the name "jumping bean tree".

A similar phenomenon occurs with the Mexican jumping bean, Sebastiania sp., which also belong to the Euphorbia family. This bean is parasitised by the moth Cydia saltitans.
