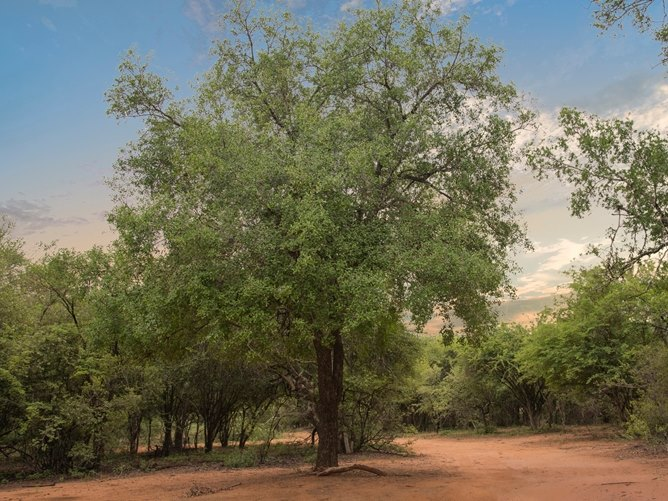

Conservation status
- Least Concern (IUCN 3.1)

Scientific classification
- Kingdom: Plantae
- Clade: Tracheophytes
- Clade: Angiosperms
- Clade: Eudicots
- Clade: Rosids
- Order: Malpighiales
- Family: Euphorbiaceae
- Genus: Spirostachys
- Species: S. africana

Binomial name
- Spirostachys africana Sond.

= Spirostachys africana =

Tamboti

Species of tree

Spirostachys africana is a medium-sized (about 10 metres (33 ft) tall) deciduous tree with a straight, clear trunk, occurring in the warmer parts of Southern Africa. Its wood is known as tamboti, tambotie, tambootie or tambuti.

It prefers growing in single-species copses in deciduous woodland, often along watercourses or on brackish flats and sandy soils.

== Description ==
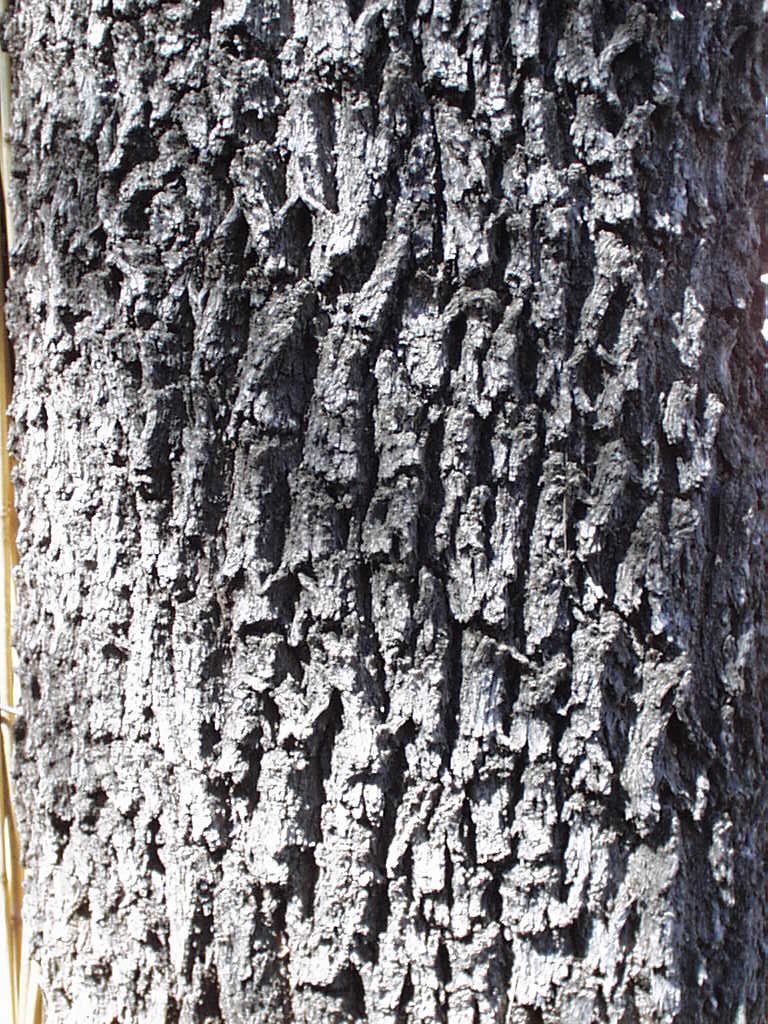
S. africana trunk

The leaves are small, elliptic with crenate margins, and turn bright red in winter before dropping. The petiole has 2 small glands at the distal end. The grey-black rough bark is distinctively split into neat rectangles. The catkin-like flowers appear in early spring before the leaves. Male and female flowers are borne separately on the same tree (monoecious). The small 3-lobed capsules or schizocarps split into three equal indehiscent segments (mericarps or cocci) when ripe; on a warm day this splitting (dehiscence) can sound like a distant fusillade of shots. The seeds are globose with a chartaceous testa.

== Wood and toxicity ==
Despite it being prone to heart-rot, it is prized in the furniture industry for its beautiful, dense and durable timber, which is reddish-brown with darker streaks, a satin-like lustre and extremely fragrant sweet, spicy smell. The underbark exudes a white, poisonous latex when freshly cut, and campfires that burn tamboti fuel give off noxious fumes contaminating meat or other food grilled on the open flames or coals. The latex is used as a fish poison, is applied to arrow-tips and is used as a purgative by indigenous tribes.

== Jumping beans ==
The fruits while green are frequently parasitised by the small grey moth Emporia melanobasis (Pyralidae: Phycitinae). Larvae develop within the growing fruits which show no external damage. When the fruits are mature each splits into 3 cocci. The larvae jack-knife inside the fallen segments, causing them to move about erratically and vigorously, to the surprise of the uninitiated. This has led to the name "jumping bean tree". The Mexican jumping bean, Sebastiania sp., also belongs to the family Euphorbiaceae and is parasitised by the moth Cydia saltitans.

== Gallery ==
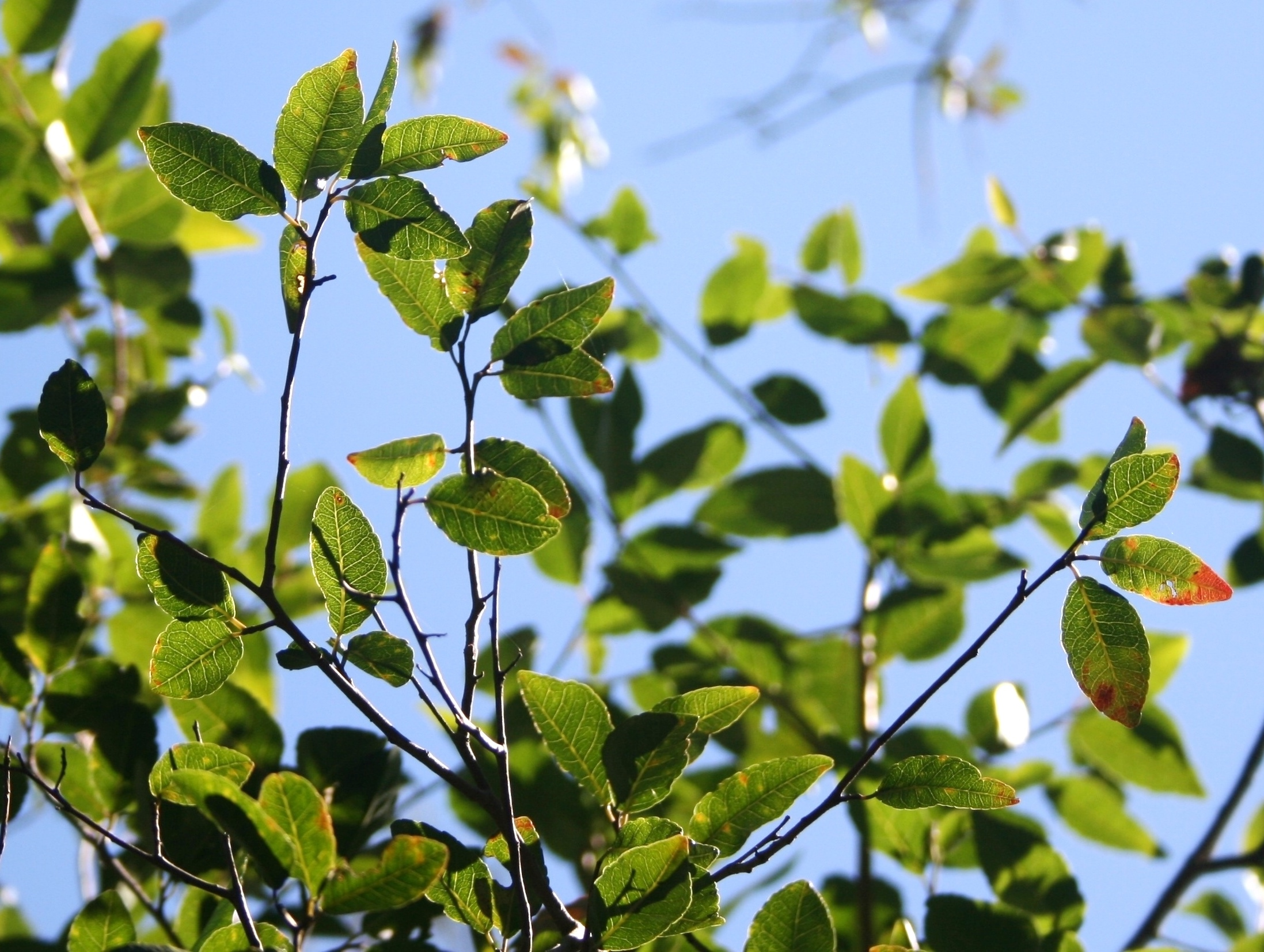
S. africana foliage

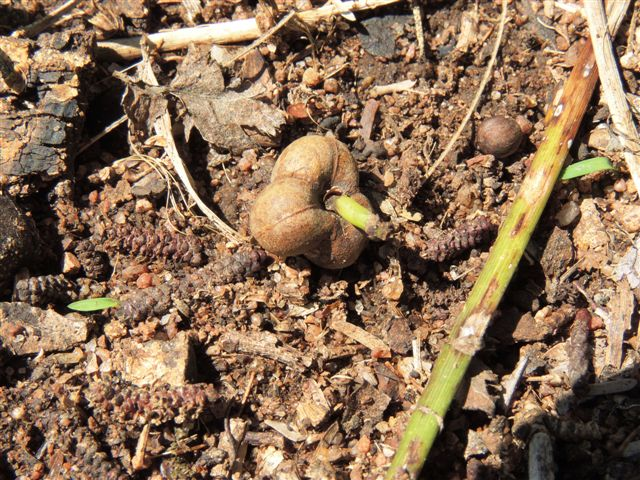
fruit capsule or schizocarp

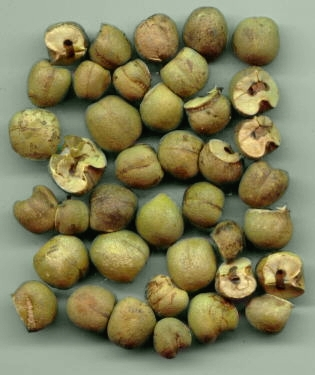
fruit and fruit segments or mericarps

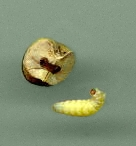
mericarp with Emporia melanobasis larva

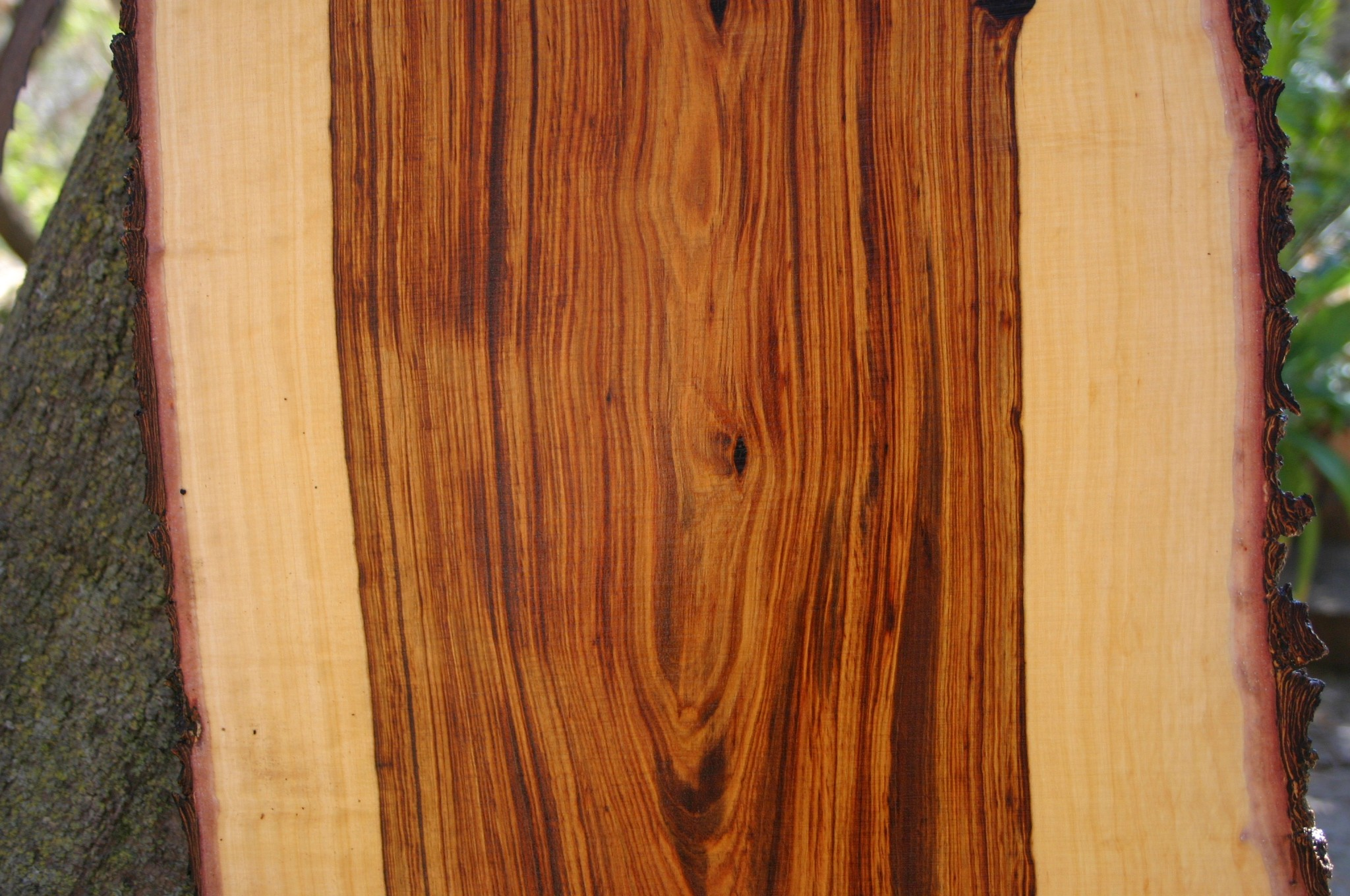
Wood

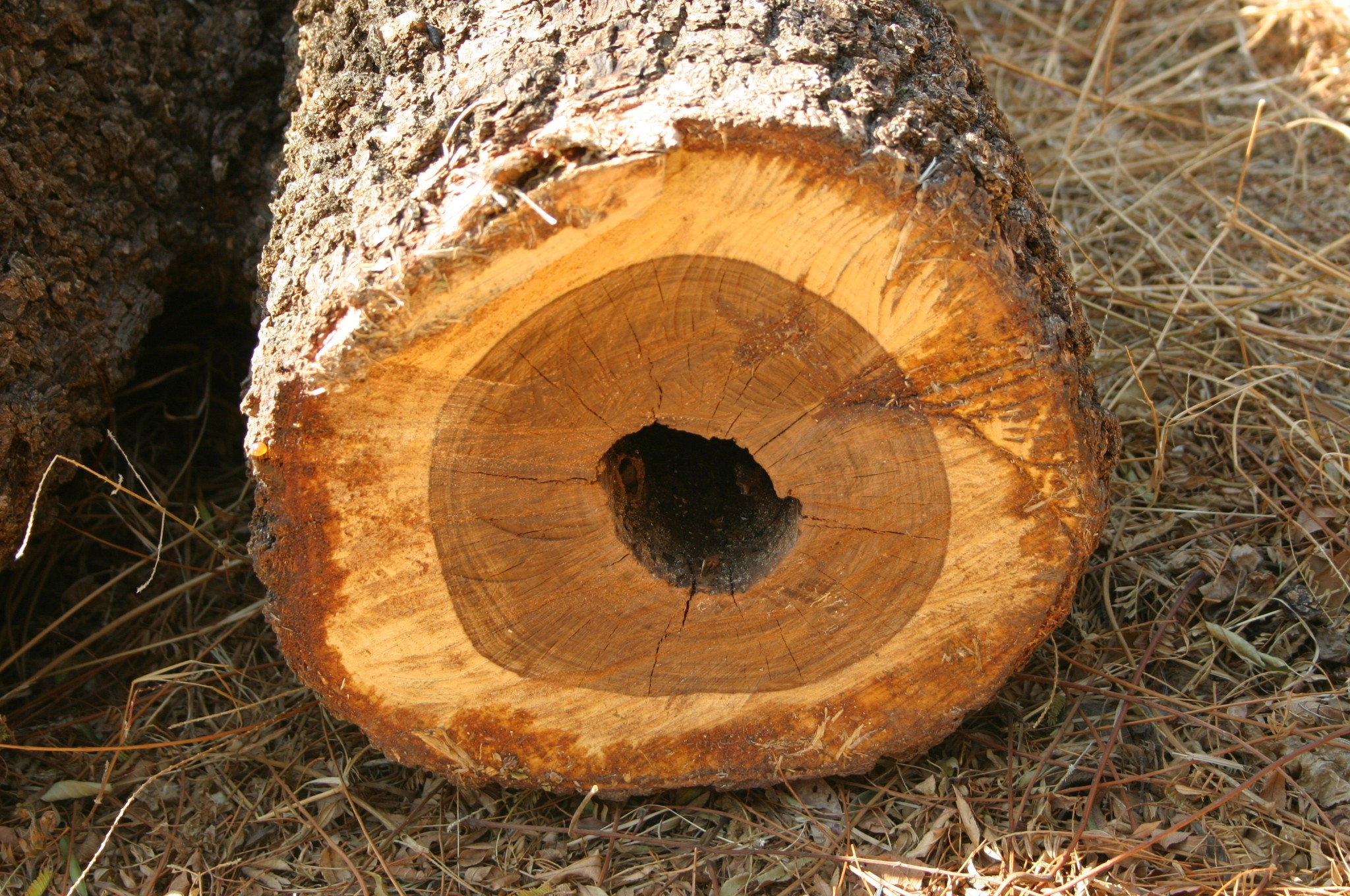
Log with heart-rot

== See also ==
- List of Southern African indigenous trees
