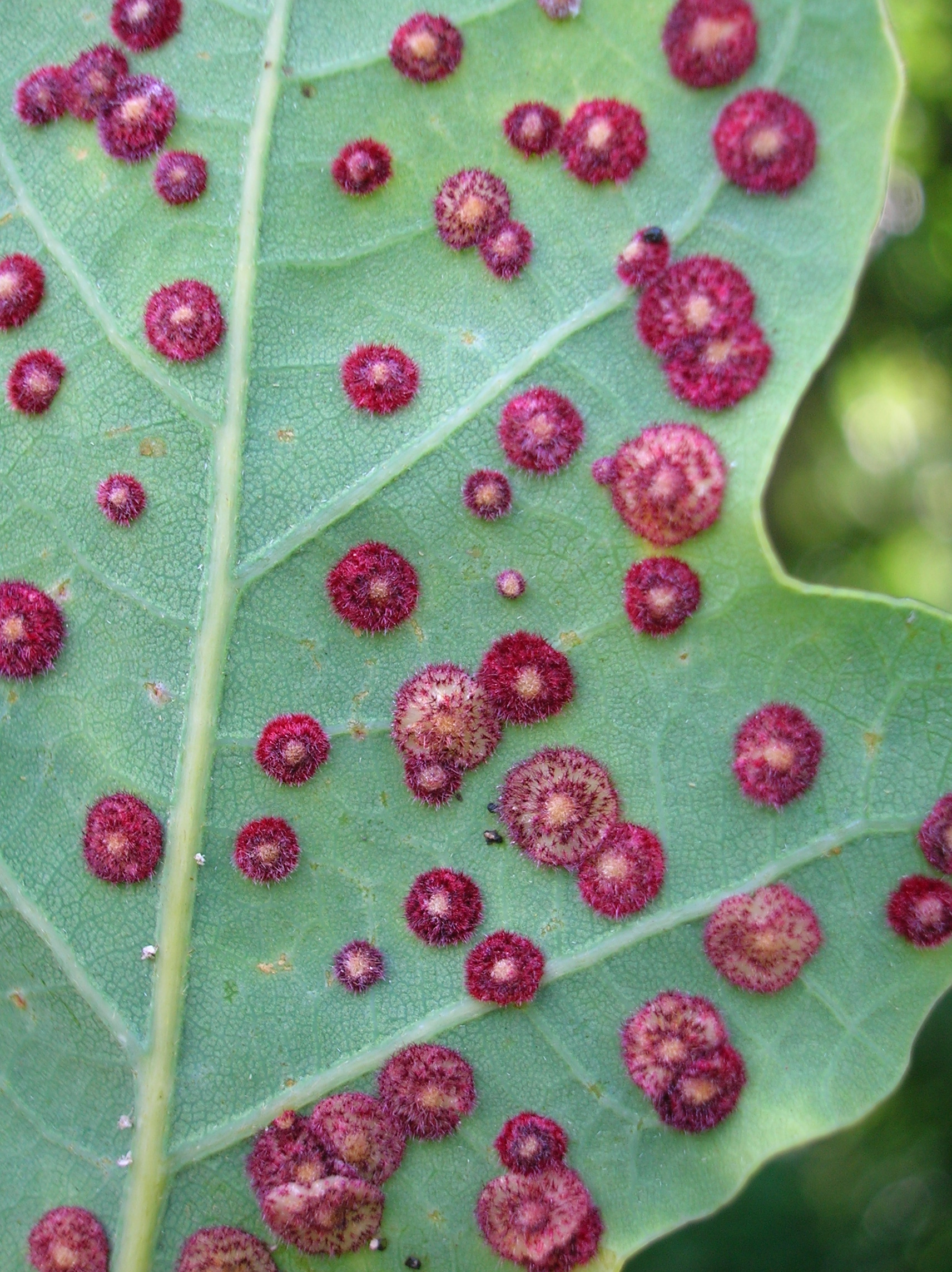

Scientific classification
- Kingdom: Animalia
- Phylum: Arthropoda
- Class: Insecta
- Order: Hymenoptera
- Family: Cynipidae
- Genus: Neuroterus
- Species: N. quercusbaccarum

Binomial name
- Neuroterus quercusbaccarum (Linnaeus, 1758)

= Neuroterus quercusbaccarum =

Species of wasp

The common spangle gall on the underside of leaves and the currant gall on the male catkins or occasionally the leaves, develop as chemically induced distortions on pedunculate oak (Quercus robur), or sessile oak (Quercus petraea) trees, caused by the cynipid wasp Neuroterus quercusbaccarum which has both agamic and bisexual generations.

Previous names or synonyms for this species are Neuroterus baccarum, N. lenticularis, N. malpighii, Cynips lenticularis, C. quercus-baccarum, Spathegaster baccarum, S. varius, S. interruptor.

== Galls ==
The spangle gall generation on the underside of the oak leaves are flat discs, with a distinct central elevation, slightly hairy, yellow-green at first and reddish later, attached by a short stalk. These galls are up to 6 mm in diameter, unilocular, unilarval with a whitish or yellow undersurface; they mature in September, detach and fall to the ground before the leaves themselves. The larva continue to develop in the fallen spangle and, protected by the leaf layer, they overwinter. Any spangle galls that remain attached to the leaves dry and die.

The smooth surfaced currant gall generation appears in April and lay unfertilised eggs in the staminate catkins or occasionally the developing young leaves. The resulting spherical galls are around 4 mm in diameter, unilocular and unilarval, green at first, maturing through pink to red, therefore closely resembling redcurrants.

Several different spangle type galls are found on oak leaves so close inspection is required for proper identification.

The suckers at the base of older trees are often more heavily infested than the mature tree foliage. This may be due to the poor flying abilities of N. quercusbaccarum or it may relate to the physiological age of the leaves.

The spangle galls are sometimes misidentified as scale insects.

== Distribution on the leaves ==
The distribution and numbers of spangle galls on mature oak trees differs from that on young trees; the differences could be partly due to the earlier date of leaf opening on mature trees. No spatial zonation of spangle galls was apparent on the mature trees. Galls on catkins are less parasitised than those on leaves.

== Life cycle ==
The male and female of the bisexual generation emerge in June from the currant galls and after mating the fertilised eggs are laid in the lower epidermis of the oak leaves. The spangle galls develop over the winter and the insects emerge in April, laying their eggs in the catkins or lower epidermis. The cycle, an alternation of generation, then begins again.

== Predators, inquilines, and parasitoids ==
Spangles lying on the ground are often eaten by gamebirds and both of these galls are prone to being colonised by a variety of other organisms. Synergus spp. are inquilines which attack small galls, and the primary parasitoid Mesopolobus tibialis attacks medium size galls and Torymus auratus attacks large galls. The two parasitoids affect the final mature size of the spangle galls, highlighting the galling insects chemical influence upon the host plant.

== Infestations ==
From 80 to 100 spangle galls can develop on the underside of each leaf and therefore vast numbers fall onto the ground in September, sometimes completely colouring and covering the ground. Infestations do not have any serious effect upon galled trees.

== Distribution ==
N. quercusbaccarum is found throughout Europe, Asia Minor and North Africa.

== Gallery ==
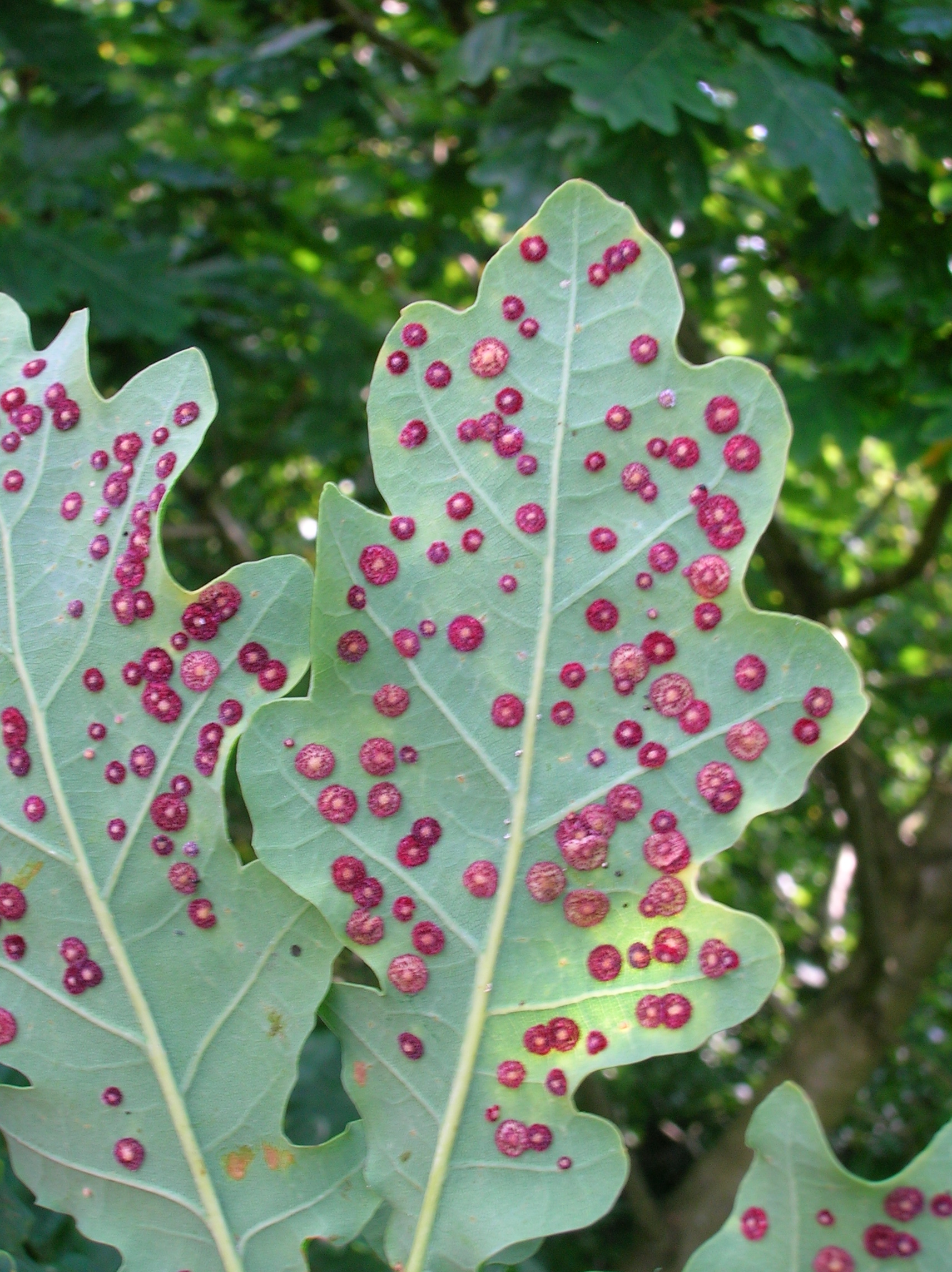
Common spangle galls on a Quercus robur leaf

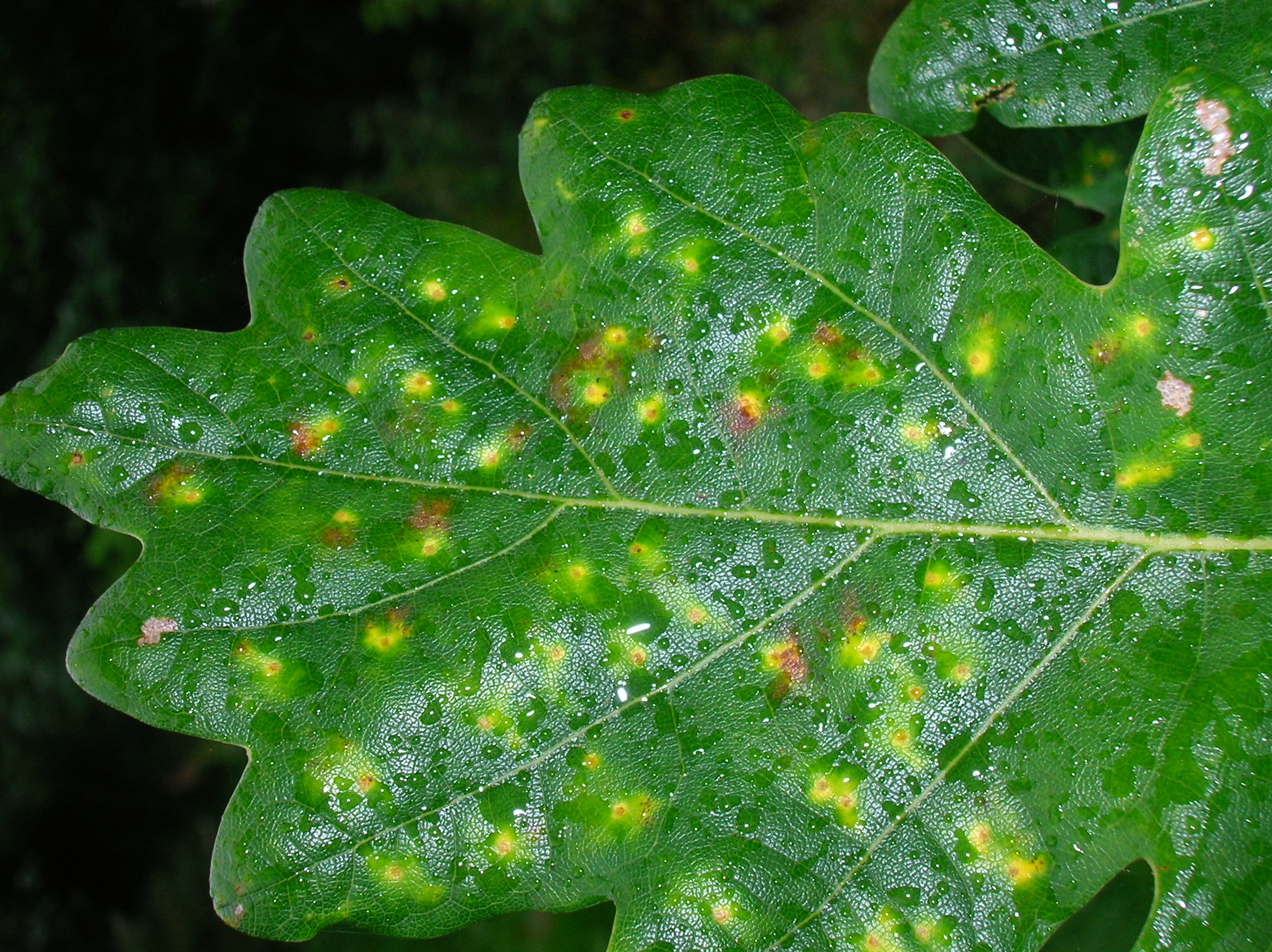
Upper surface of galled leaf

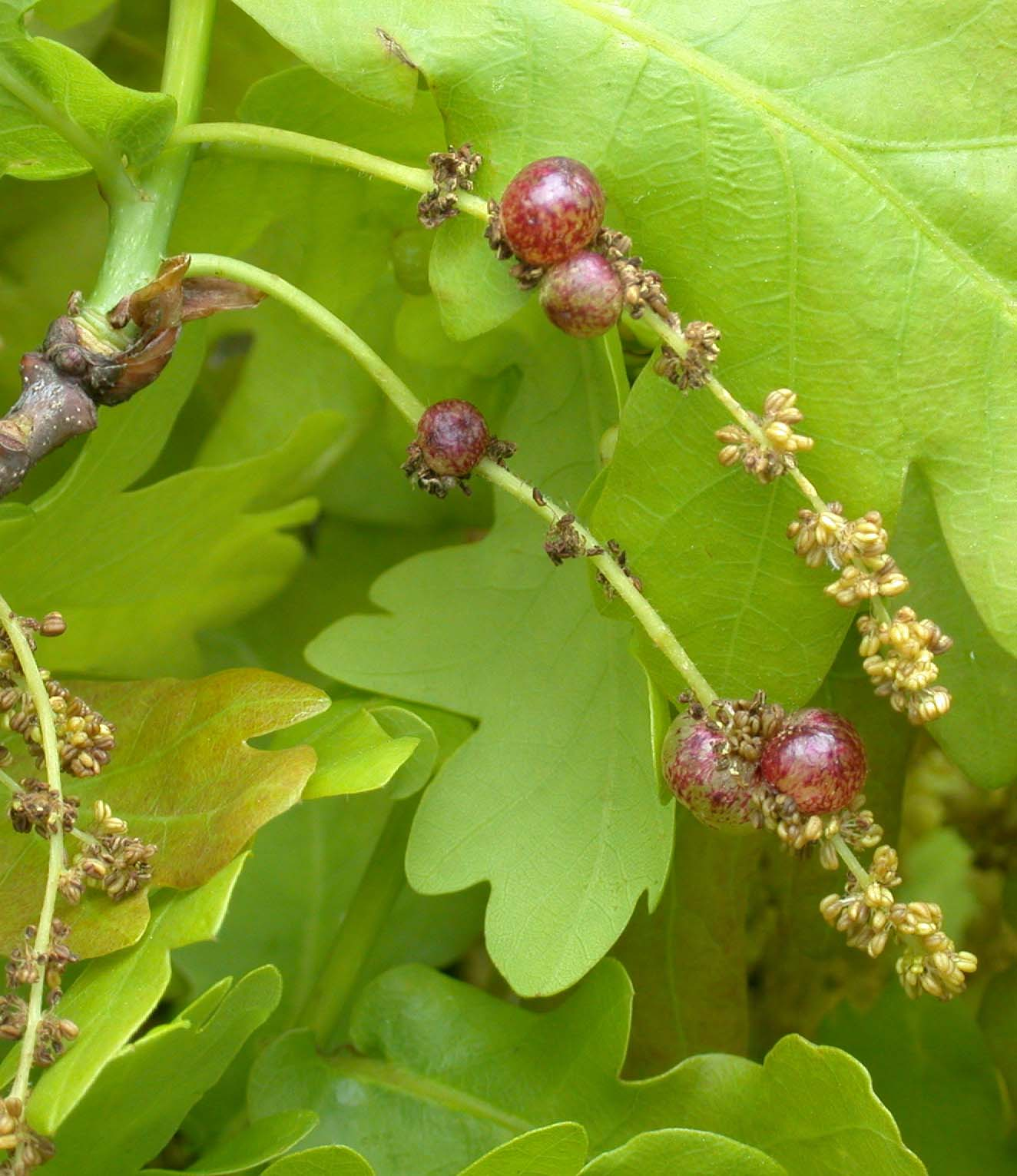
Sexual generation gall

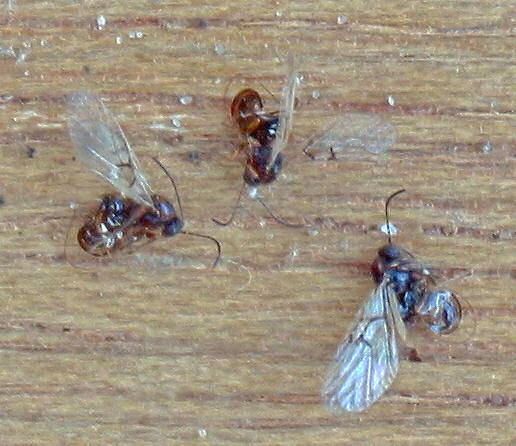
The gall wasp N. albipes, similar to N. quercusbaccarum

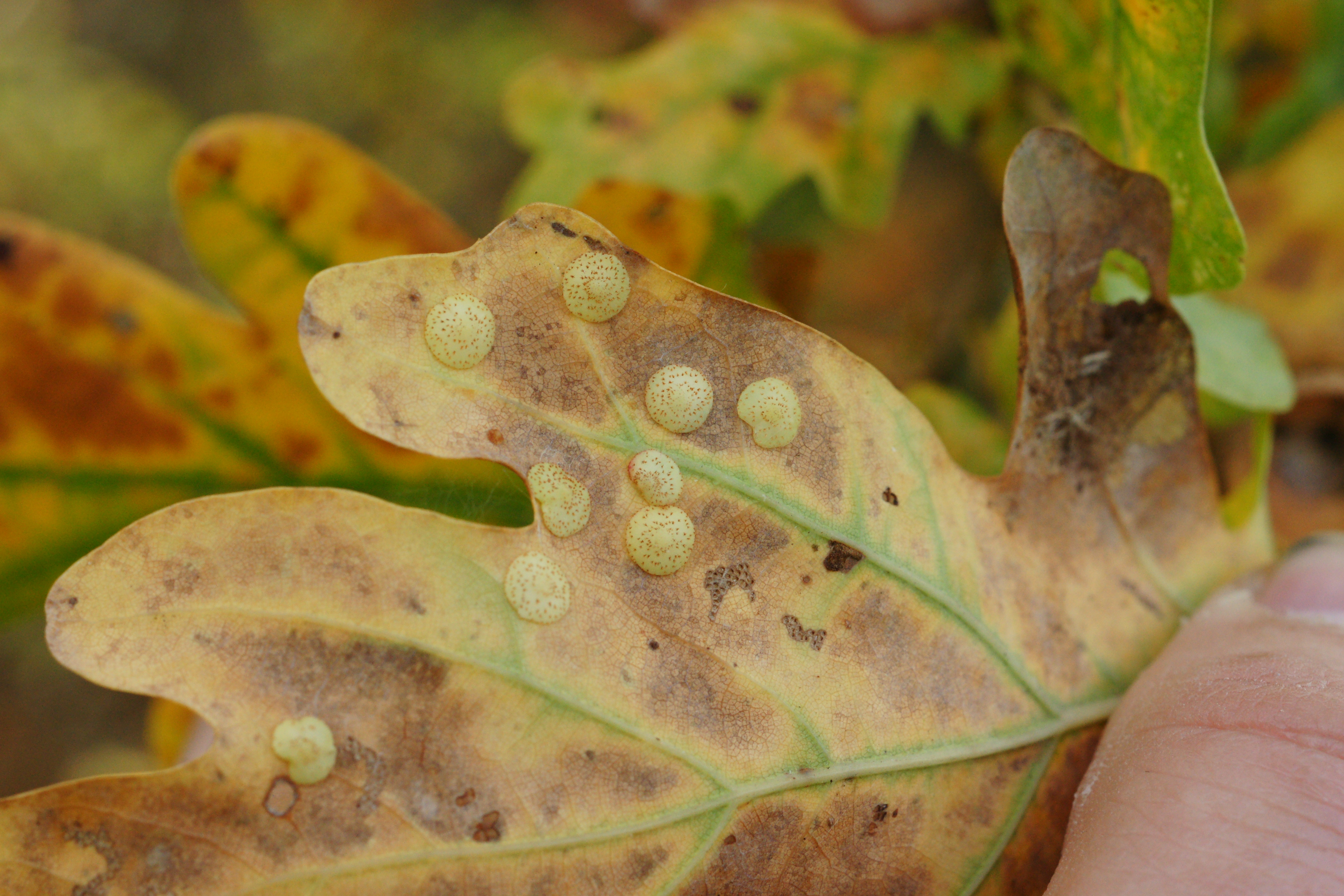
Underside of oak leaf with wasp galls

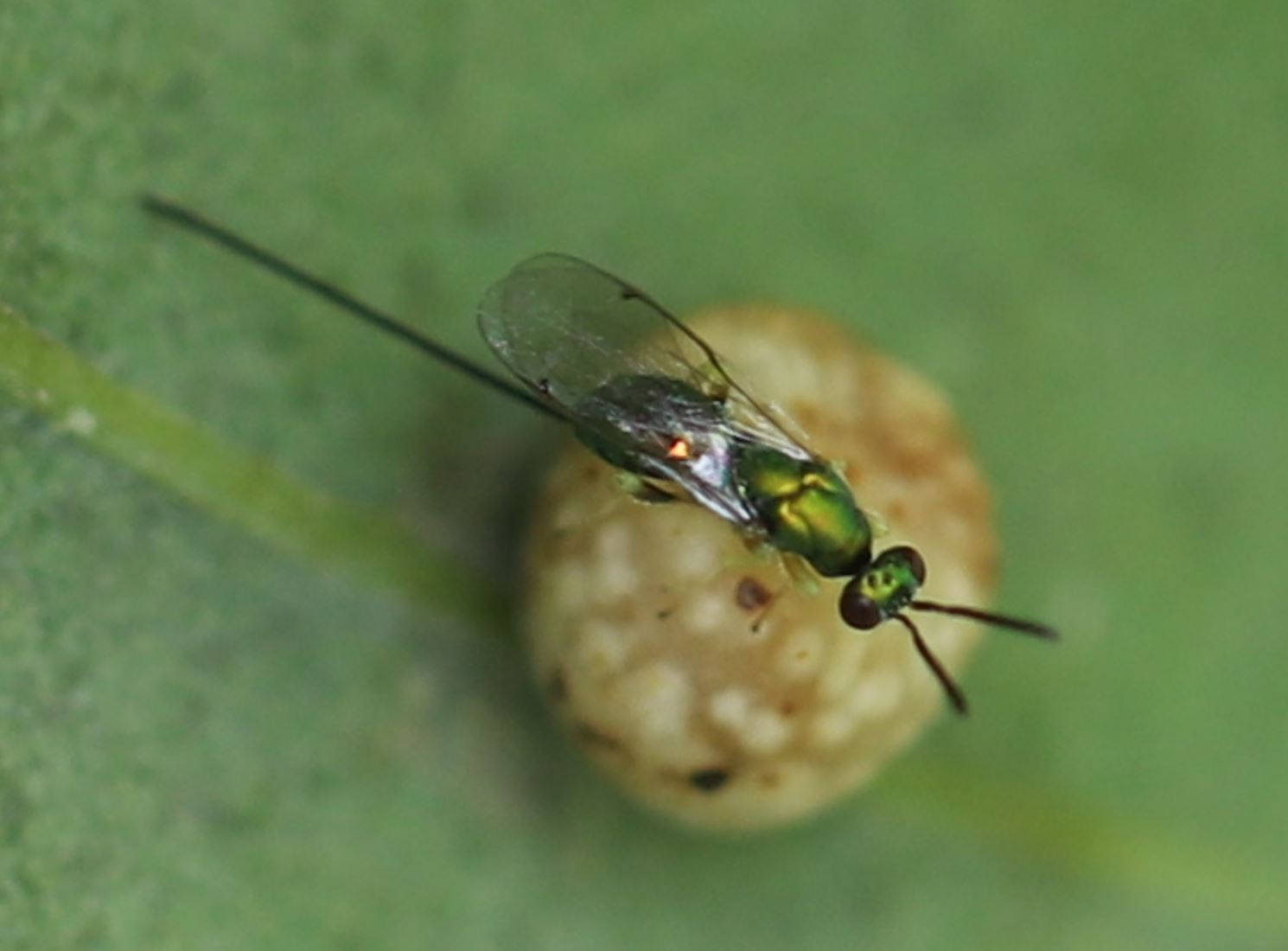
Parasitoid Torymus auratus

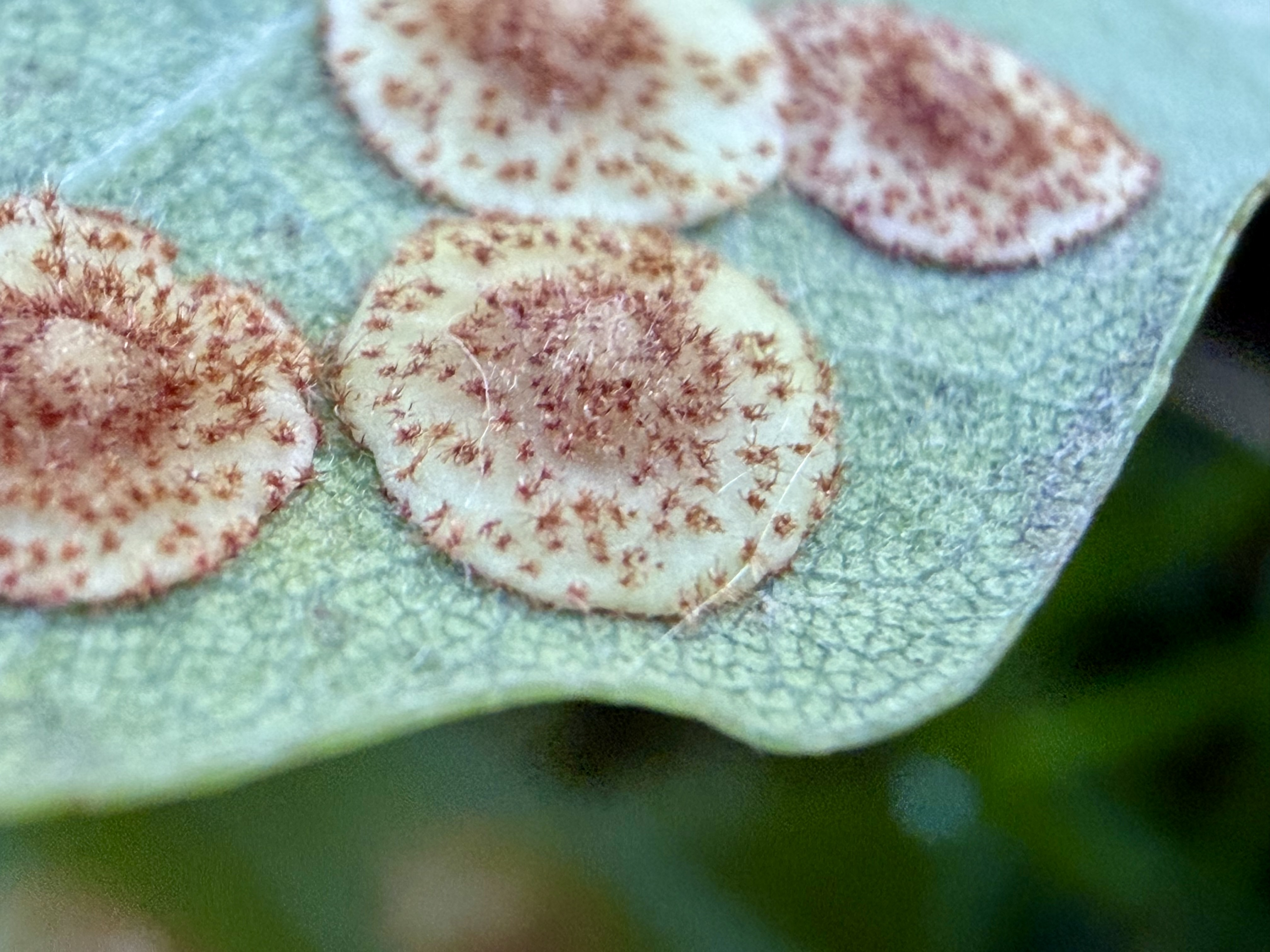
Close-up of a gall

== See also ==
- Knopper gall
- Oak artichoke gall
- Rose bedeguar gall
- Neuroterus albipes
- Neuroterus anthracinus
