= Edna Libby Beutenmüller =

American scientific illustrator and collector

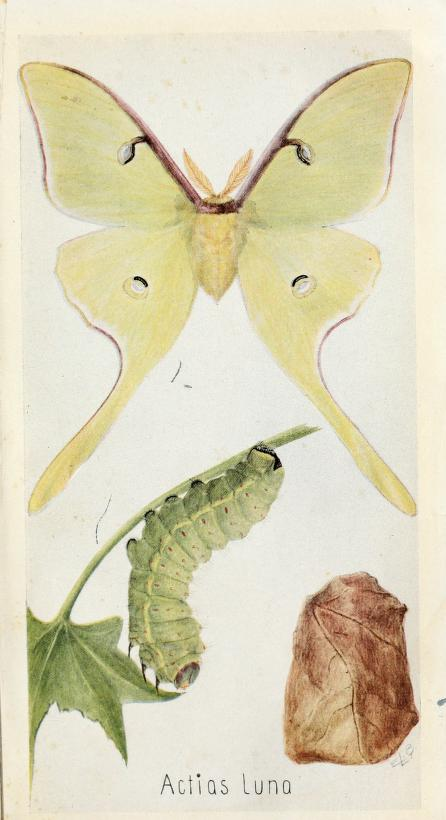
- Born: Edna Libby Hyatt; December 8, 1872; Lincoln, Nebraska, U.S.
- Died: July 14, 1934 (aged 61); Tenafly, New Jersey, U.S.
- Resting place: Brookside Cemetery
- Known for: Scientific illustration
- Spouse: William Beutenmüller

Edna Libby Beutenmüller (née Hyatt; December 8, 1872 – July 14, 1934) was an American scientific illustrator notable for producing illustrations in publications including those published by the American Museum of Natural History. After coming to New York in 1899, she studied art and began working as a botanical illustrator.

She was also a collector of specimens and assisted with the scientific study of insect species. A resident of Tenafly, New Jersey, she was married to William Beutenmuller.
