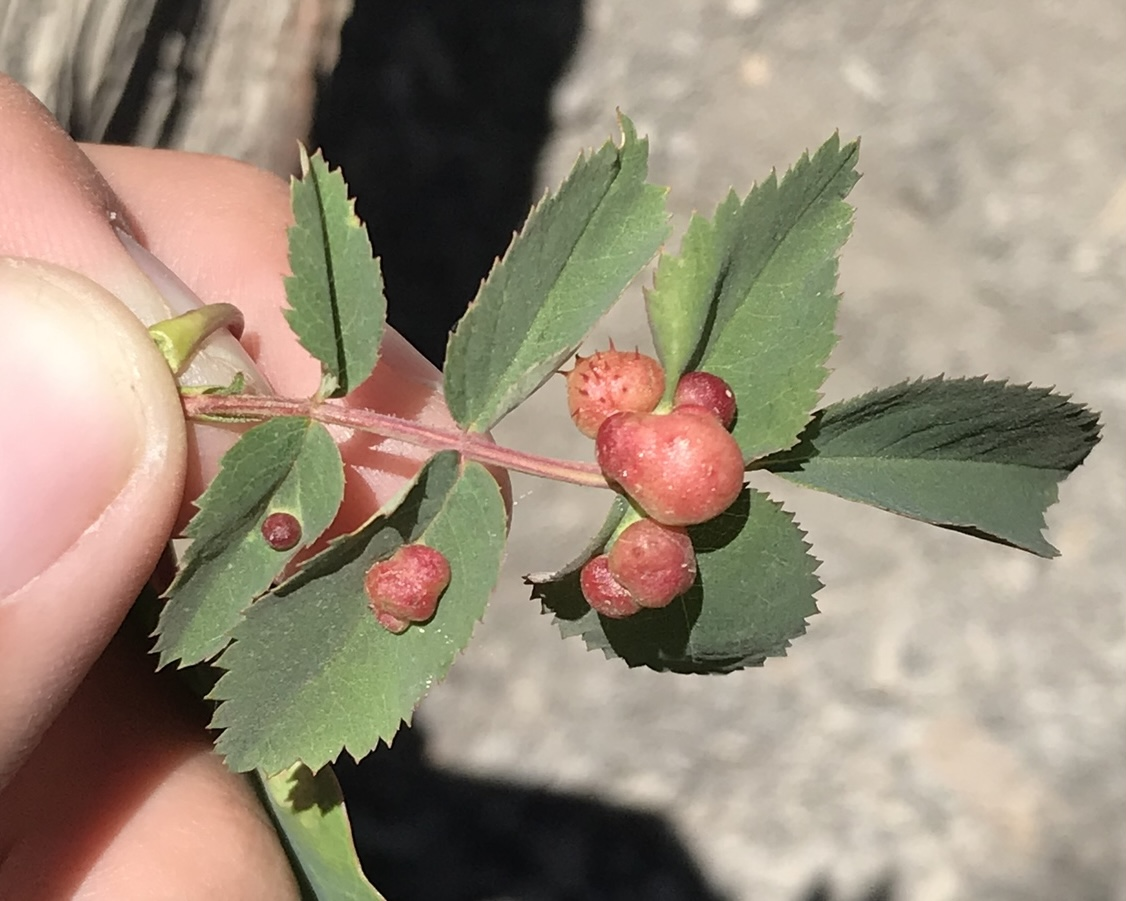
- Grand Mesa National Forest, 2020

Scientific classification
- Kingdom: Animalia
- Phylum: Arthropoda
- Class: Insecta
- Order: Hymenoptera
- Family: Diplolepididae
- Genus: Diplolepis
- Species: D. ignota

Binomial name
- Diplolepis ignota (Osten Sacken, 1863)

Synonyms
- Rhodites ignota Osten Sacken, 1863

= Diplolepis ignota =

Species of wasp

Diplolepis ignota is a species of gall wasp (Cynipidae). Galls in which the larvae live and feed are formed on the leaves of several species of wild rose (Rosa). Individual galls are single-chambered and spherical, but multiple galls can coalesce into irregularly rounded galls.

== Range ==
This species has been reported throughout most of the continental United States, and in Canada from Alberta, Saskatchewan, and Manitoba.

== Ecology ==
Diplolepis ignota galls have been reported from Rosa arkansana, R. blanda, R. carolina, R. virginiana, and R. nitida. Gall initiation typically occurs in August, and the galls remain attached to their hosts, with adults emerging from the galls the following summer. Inquilines and parasitoids of the larvae include species of Periclistus (Cynipidae), Aprostocetus (Eulophidae), Eurytoma (Eurytomidae), and Orthopelma (Ichneumonidae).

== Taxonomy ==
This species was first described as Rhodites ignota by Carl Robert Osten-Sacken in 1863. It was subsequently determined that the genus name Diplolepis had priority over Rhodites. Recent studies have shown that this species is very closely related to Diplolepis nebulosa and D. variabilis.
