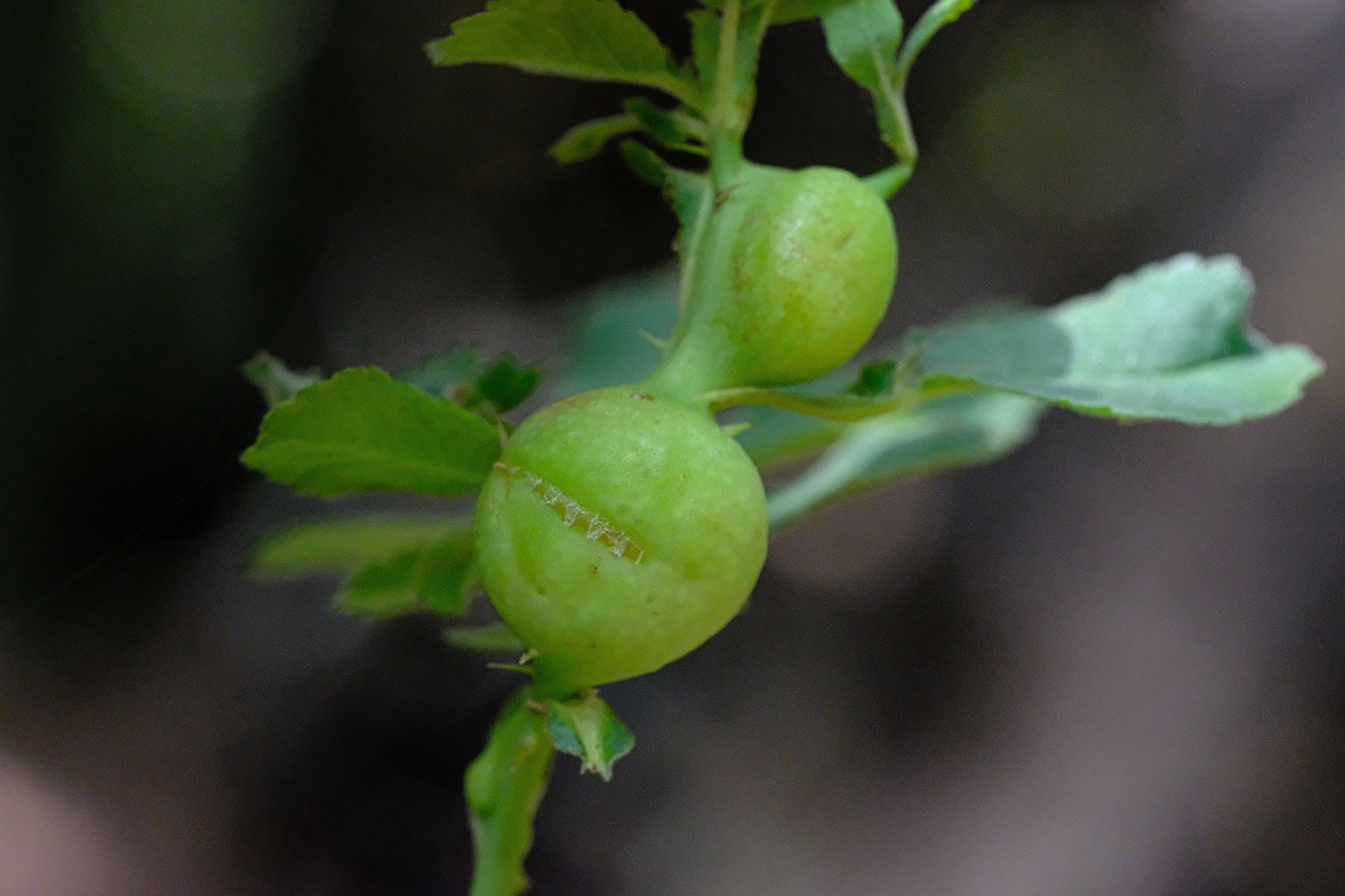
- Cuyamaca Rancho State Park, California, 2021

Scientific classification
- Kingdom: Animalia
- Phylum: Arthropoda
- Class: Insecta
- Order: Hymenoptera
- Family: Diplolepididae
- Subfamily: Diplolepidinae
- Genus: Diplolepis
- Species: D. nodulosa

Binomial name
- Diplolepis nodulosa (Beutenmuller, 1909)

= Diplolepis nodulosa =

North American gall-inducing wasp

Diplolepis nodulosa, also known as the rose-stem gall wasp, is a species of cynipid wasp that induces bud galls on wild roses in North America. This galls induced by this species have a number of inquilines and parasitoids. D. nodulosa is assigned to a clade of Nearctic stem gallers within Diplolepis along with Diplolepis californica, Diplolepis oregonesis, Diplolepis spinosa, and Diplolepis triforma.
