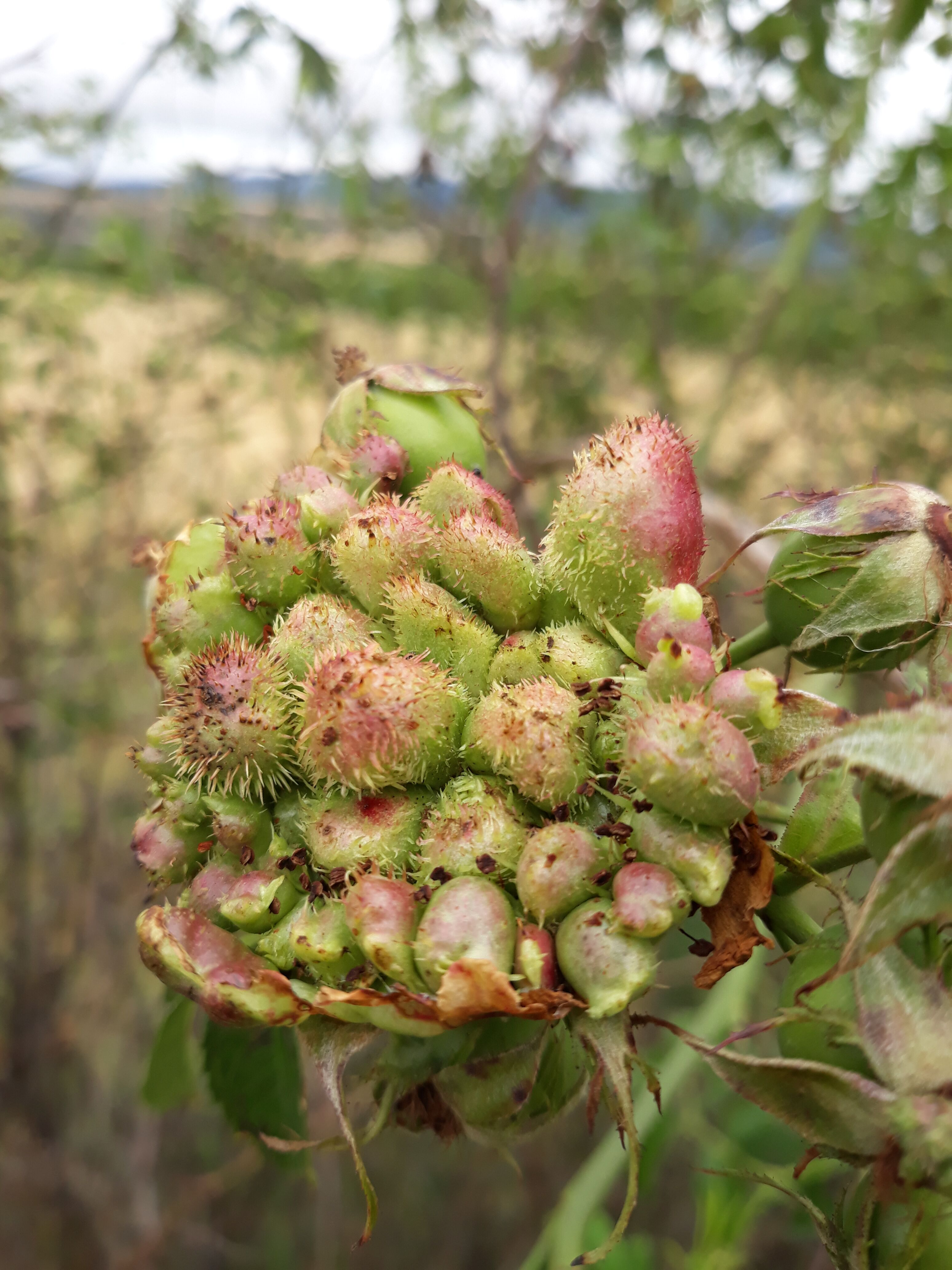
- Mature gall on wild rose

Scientific classification
- Domain: Eukaryota
- Kingdom: Animalia
- Phylum: Arthropoda
- Class: Insecta
- Order: Hymenoptera
- Family: Diplolepididae
- Genus: Diplolepis
- Species: D. fructuum

Binomial name
- Diplolepis fructuum (Rübsaamen, 1895)

= Diplolepis fructuum =

Species of wasp

Diplolepis fructuum (Rübsaamen, 1895) is a hymenopteran gall wasp which causes a galls on wild roses. The species is closely related to D. rosae and D. mayri but it produces its galls in the seeds of wild roses thus damaging its hips. The species is distributed mainly in the Northern regions of the Middle East, the Caucasus region and Northern shores of the Black Sea.
