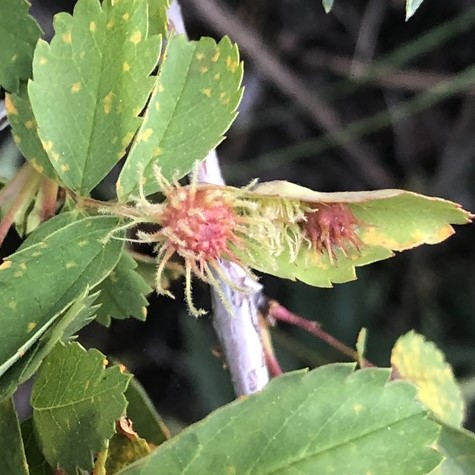

Scientific classification
- Kingdom: Animalia
- Phylum: Arthropoda
- Class: Insecta
- Order: Hymenoptera
- Family: Diplolepididae
- Subfamily: Diplolepidinae
- Genus: Diplolepis
- Species: D. bassetti

Binomial name
- Diplolepis bassetti (Beutenmüller, 1918)

= Diplolepis bassetti =

North American gall-inducing wasp

Diplolepis bassetti, also known as the mossy rose gall wasp, is a species of cynipid wasp that induces bud galls on wild roses in North America. Hosts include interior rose, Nootka rose, and pine rose.
