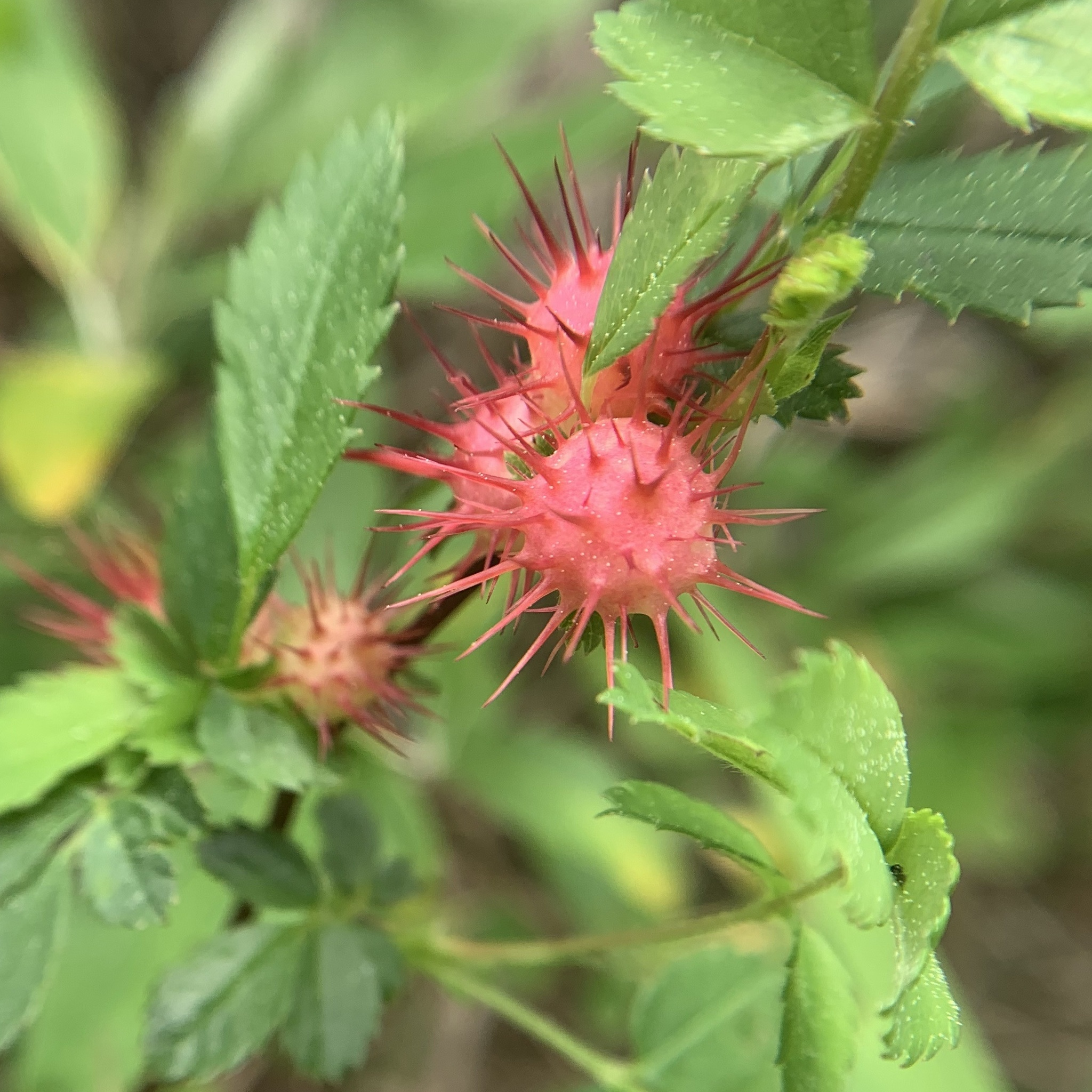
- Goat Hill Serpentine Barrens, Nottingham, Pennsylvania, 2022

Scientific classification
- Kingdom: Animalia
- Phylum: Arthropoda
- Class: Insecta
- Order: Hymenoptera
- Family: Diplolepididae
- Genus: Diplolepis
- Species: D. bicolor

Binomial name
- Diplolepis bicolor (Beutenmuller, 1907)

= Diplolepis bicolor =

North American gall-inducing wasp

Diplolepis bicolor, also known as the spiny bud gall wasp, is a species of cynipid wasp that induces bud galls on wild roses. This gall wasp is found throughout North America. The galls measure 10 to 12 mm in diameter and have a superficial resemblance to the leaf galls induced by Diplolepis polita.
