= Prairie Rose =

Prairie Rose may refer to:

A number of bushy flowering plants:

- Rosa arkansana (wild prairie rose)
- Rosa blanda (smooth rose)
- Rosa setigera (climbing rose)
- Rosa virginiana (Virginia rose)

Other things:

- Prairie Rose, North Dakota
- Prairie Rose State Games, a North Dakota athletic event
- Rural Municipality of Prairie Rose No. 309, Saskatchewan, Canada
- "Prairie Rose", a song by Roxy Music on the 1974 album Country Life (Roxy Music album)
