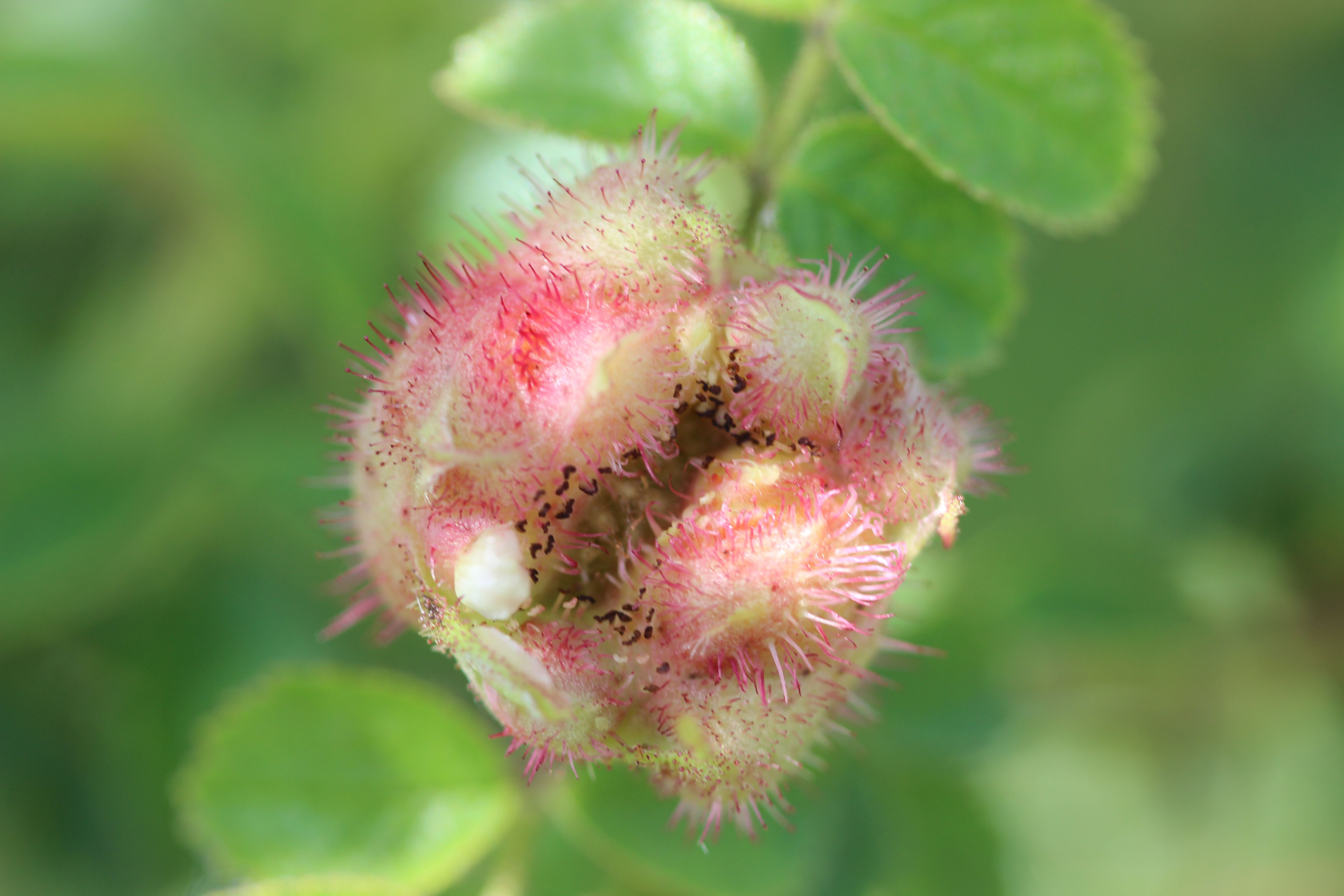
- A young gall of Diplolepis mayri on Rosa sp.

Scientific classification
- Kingdom: Animalia
- Phylum: Arthropoda
- Class: Insecta
- Order: Hymenoptera
- Family: Diplolepididae
- Genus: Diplolepis
- Species: D. mayri

Binomial name
- Diplolepis mayri (Schlechtendal, 1877)

= Diplolepis mayri =

Species of wasp

Diplolepis mayri is a gall inducing insect (Hymenoptera: Cynipidae) causing galls on wild roses (Rosa sp.) in the Western Palaearctic. Diploleis mayri is less frequent on rose shrubs than D. rosae.

== Description ==
Its galls show in their external morphology resemblance to the mossy rose gall or robin's pincushion (Diplolepis rosae), but the surface of the gall is less covered and the emergences on it are more spine-like. It may appear together with D. rosae on the same host plant. Galls of D. mayri are multilocular and its chambers have thicker walls than found in D. rosae.

== Predators, parasitoids and inquilines ==
In the winter time galls of D. mayri are often opened by predators just as are the galls of D. rosae. These predators may be birds as in the case of other Cynipidae galls: for D. rosae the lesser spotted woodpecker (Picoides minor), for Andricus spp. and Neuroterus spp. the great tit (Parus major).

In its galls occurs the same parasitoid assemblage as known for D. rosae. The most abundant parasitoids of both galls are Orthopelma mediator, Torymus bedeguaris, Glyphomerus stigma and Pteromalus bedeguaris. One inquiline species, Periclistus brandtii also occurs in both galls. Caenacis inflexa is exclusively the parasitoid of this inquiline. Other species as Torymus rubi, Eupelmus urozonus, Eupelmus vesicularis, Eurytoma rosae can be the parasitoids of both gall inducers and the inquiline.
