= D. rosae =

D. rosae may refer to:

- Diplocarpon rosae, a fungus species that causes the disease black spot on roses
- Diplolepis rosae, a gall wasp species

== See also ==
- Rosae
