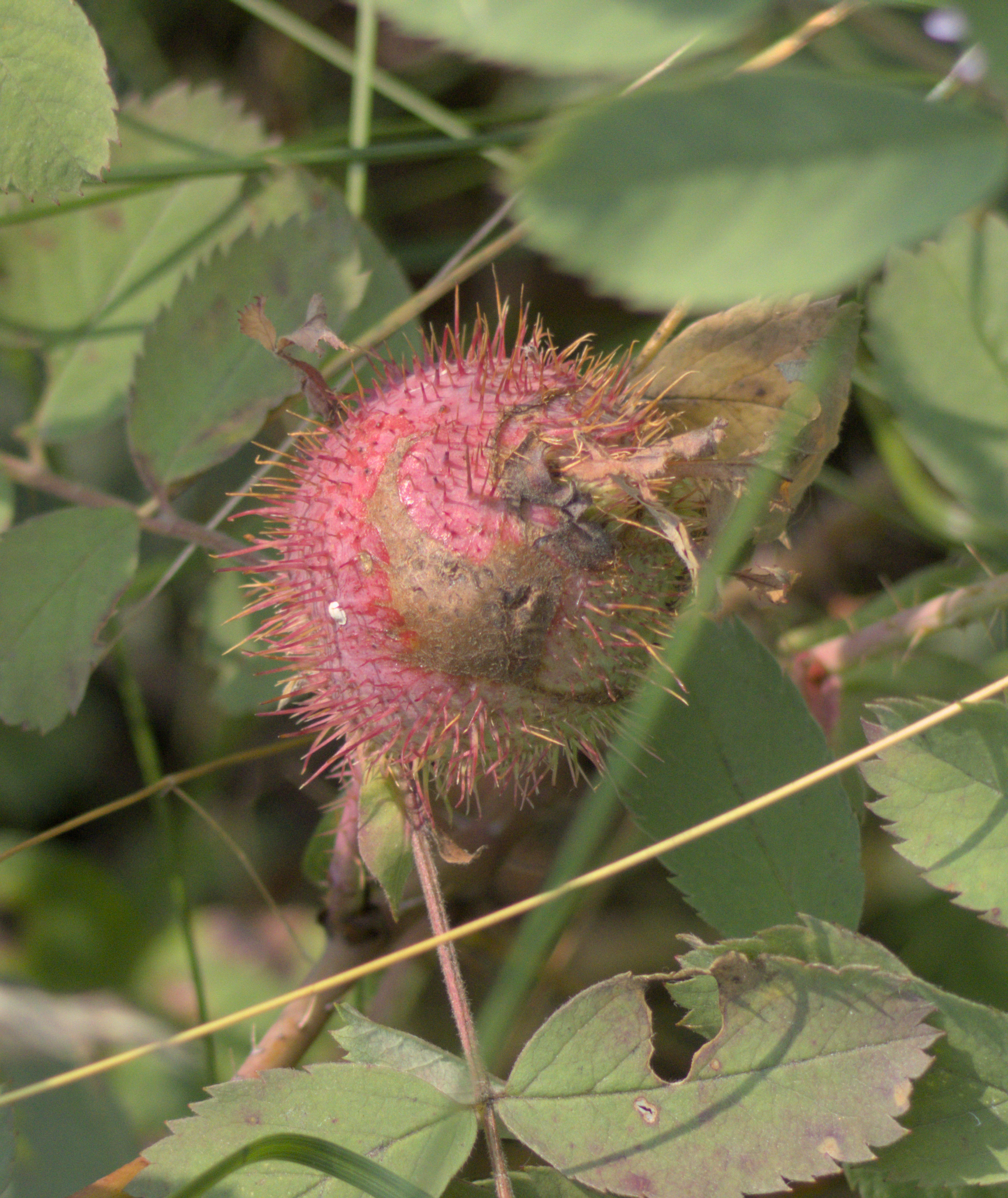
- Manitoba, 2023

Scientific classification
- Kingdom: Animalia
- Phylum: Arthropoda
- Clade: Pancrustacea
- Class: Insecta
- Order: Hymenoptera
- Family: Diplolepididae
- Genus: Diplolepis
- Species: D. spinosa

Binomial name
- Diplolepis spinosa (Ashmead, 1897)

= Diplolepis spinosa =

North American gall-inducing wasp

Diplolepis spinosa, also known as the many-spined twig gall wasp, is a species of cynipid wasp that induces galls on wild roses in North America. D. spinosa-induced galls are said to be "one of the most conspicuous" found in the grasslands of the continent.
