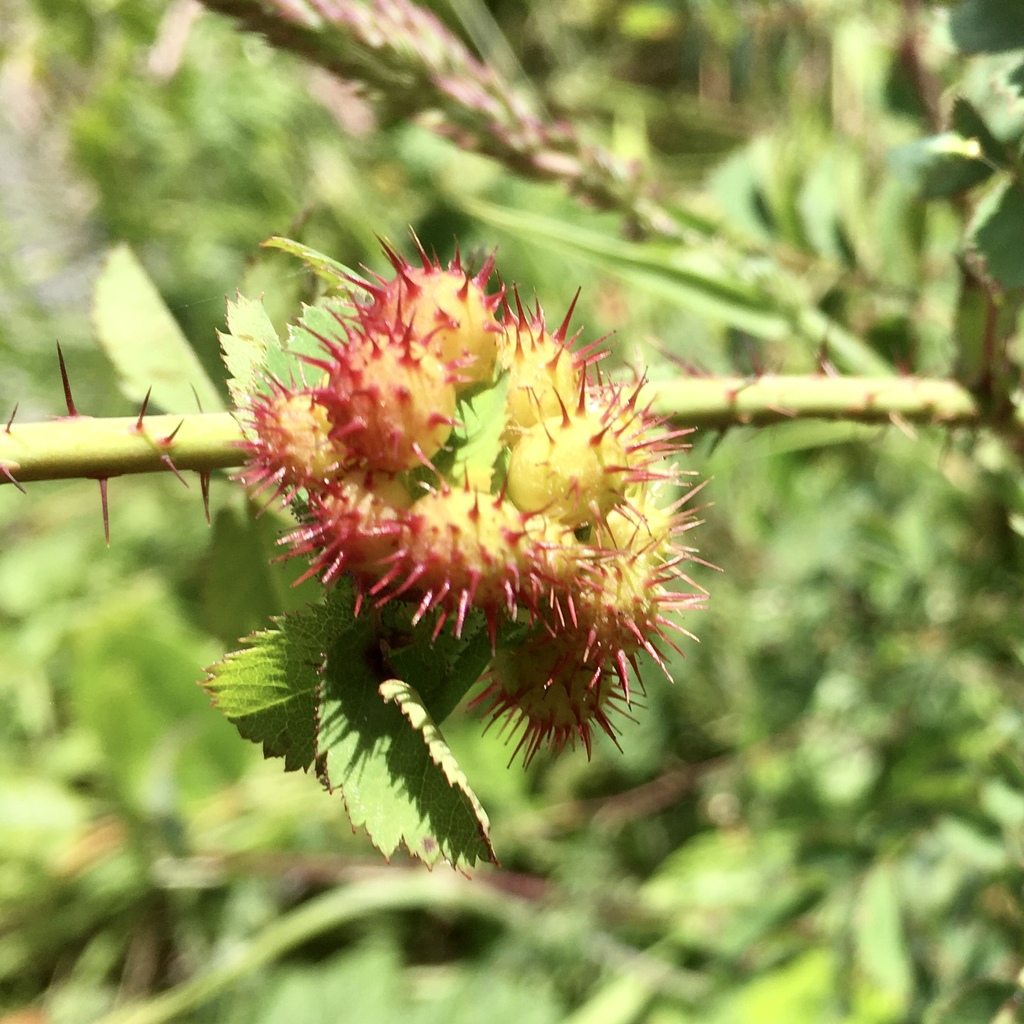
- Diplolepis polita gall on rosa gymnocarpa

Scientific classification
- Kingdom: Animalia
- Phylum: Arthropoda
- Class: Insecta
- Order: Hymenoptera
- Family: Diplolepididae
- Genus: Diplolepis
- Species: D. polita

Binomial name
- Diplolepis polita (Ashmead, 1890)

= Diplolepis polita =

Species of wasp

Diplolepis polita, known generally as the spiny leaf gall wasp, is a species of gall wasp in the family Cynipidae. It was first described by William Harris Ashmead in 1890.

This species induces galls on several species of wild roses in North America, including Rosa arkansana and Rosa acicularis. The galls are formed on the leaves in spring and early summer and are spherical with short spikes.
