= Orthopelma =

Scientific classification
- Kingdom: Animalia
- Phylum: Arthropoda
- Clade: Pancrustacea
- Class: Insecta
- Order: Hymenoptera
- Family: Ichneumonidae
- Subfamily: Orthopelmatinae; Schmiedeknecht, 1910
- Genus: Orthopelma; Taschenberg, 1865

Genus of wasps

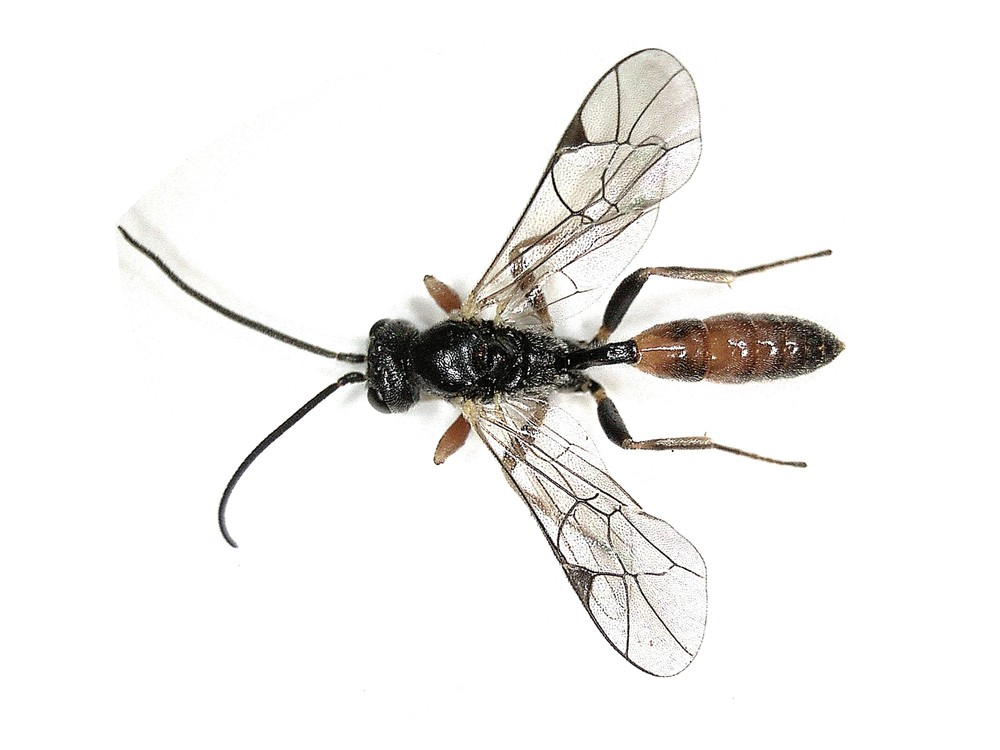
Orthopelma mediator

Orthopelma is a Holarctic genus of parasitics wasp. It is the only genus within the Ichneumonidae subfamily Orthopelmatinae. They are idiobiont endoparasitoids of cynipid galls on Rosaceae. Mostly Orthopelma are associated with Diplolepis on Rosa, but have recorded from Diastrophus on Rubus in the Nearctic.

== Species ==
The species in the genus Orthopelma include 13 extant species and one extinct species:

- Orthopelma aobing Hu, Zhang, Dal Pos, McCormark & Fang, 2025
- Orthopelma brevicorne Morley, 1907
- Orthopelma californicum Ashmead, 1890
- Orthopelma caucasicum Kasparyan, 2011
- Orthopelma chinensis Zhang, 2025
- † Orthopelma curvitibialis Statz, 1936
- Orthopelma dodecameron Kasparyan, 2011
- Orthopelma japonicum Kusigemati, 1974
- Orthopelma mediator (Thunberg, 1822)
- Orthopelma mukriyana Riedel, 2024
- Orthopelma occidentale Ashmead, 1890
- Orthopelma ovale (Provancher, 1874)
- Orthopelma simile Kusigemati, 1974
- Orthopelma superbum Kasparyan, 1984
