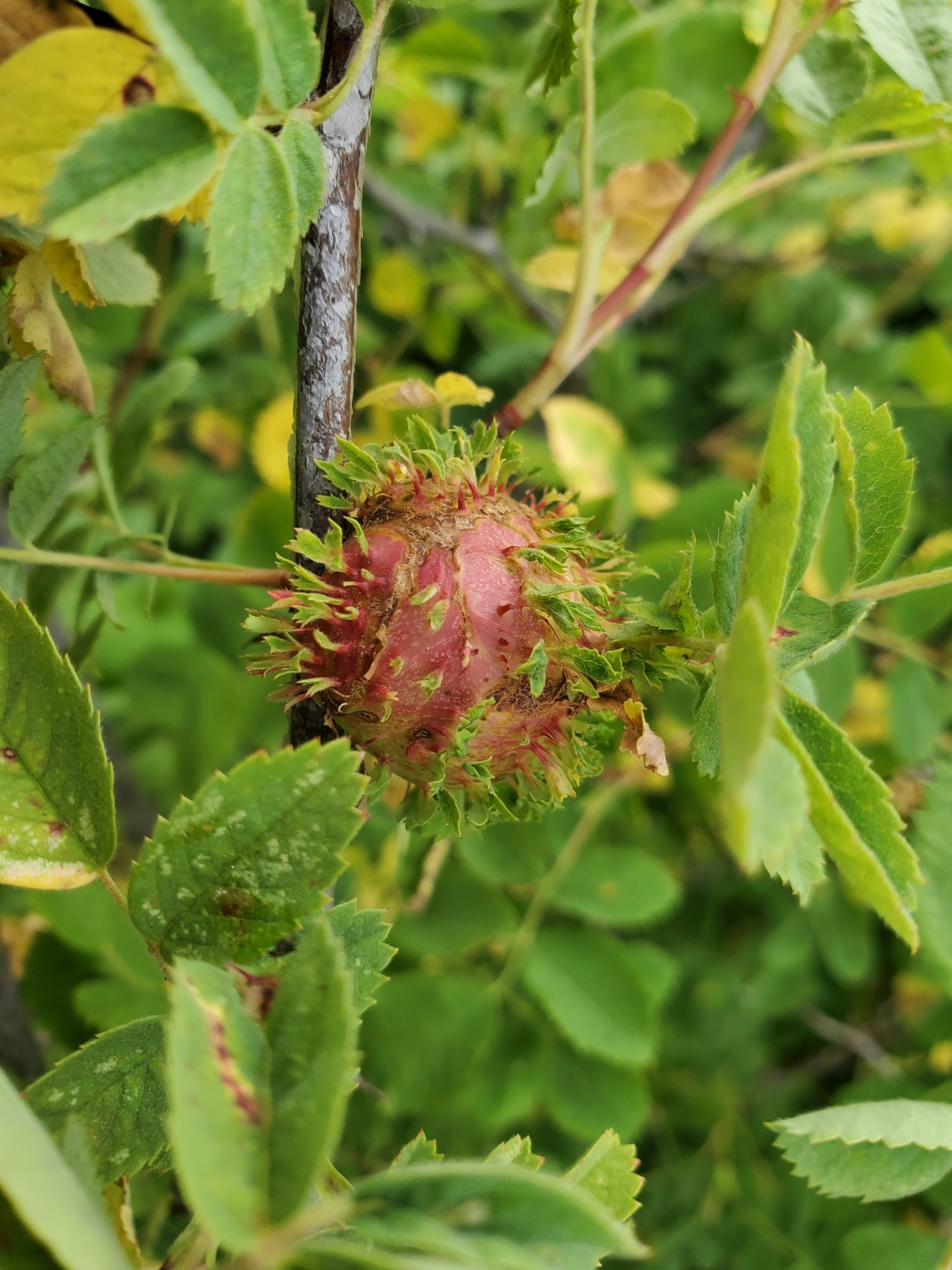
- Sacramento County, 2022

Scientific classification
- Kingdom: Animalia
- Phylum: Arthropoda
- Class: Insecta
- Order: Hymenoptera
- Family: Diplolepididae
- Subfamily: Diplolepidinae
- Genus: Diplolepis
- Species: D. californica

Binomial name
- Diplolepis californica (Beutenmueller, 1914)

Synonyms
- Rhodites californicus

= Diplolepis californica =

North American gall-inducing wasp

Diplolepis californica, formerly Rhodites californicus, also known as the leafy bract gall wasp, is a species of cynipid wasp that induces galls on wild roses on the Pacific coast of North America. D. californica induces club-shaped bud galls that naturalist Richard A. Russo describes as "distinguished from all others by the flat, leafy lobes that emanate from the main gall body and look like aborted leaflets". Each gall contains multiple larval chambers. One of host plants of the leafy bract gall wasp is Rosa californica.
