= Dietrich von Schlechtendal =

German entomologist (1834–1916)

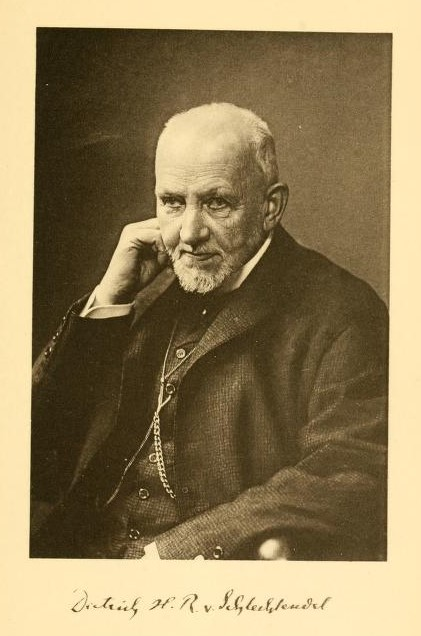
image of Dietrich von Schlechtendal

Dietrich Herrman Reinhard von Schlechtendal (20 October 1834 – 5 July 1916) was a German entomologist who worked on Cynipidae.

Born in Halle, Saxony-Anhalt, Schlechtendal trained as a mining expert and metallurgist and worked for many years as an assistant at the Geologisch-Mineralogischen Institut in Halle. His botanical knowledge led to study of gall wasps. Working on the North American species Neuroterus quercus-batatus (Fitch) in a laboratory, he bred from the parthenogenetic females the bi-sexual form. This species was then introduced onto Turkey oaks in the Halle Botanic Garden. Up to then, the trees had been sterile for decades, but they went on to produce fertile seeds.

Many species of Cynipidae were described by Schlechtendal or their generation sequence was clarified. His collection of Cynipidae with their galls is shared by the Museum für Naturkunde in Berlin and the Zoological Institute of the University of Halle-Wittenberg which also conserves his collections of Blattidae and Lepidoptera. Dietrich von Schlechtendal was an honorary member of the Entomological Society of Halle and a member of the Stettin Entomological Society.

As well as many short scientific papers, Schlechtendal wrote Die Gallbildungen (Zoocecidien) der Deutschen Gefässpflanzen (1891).
