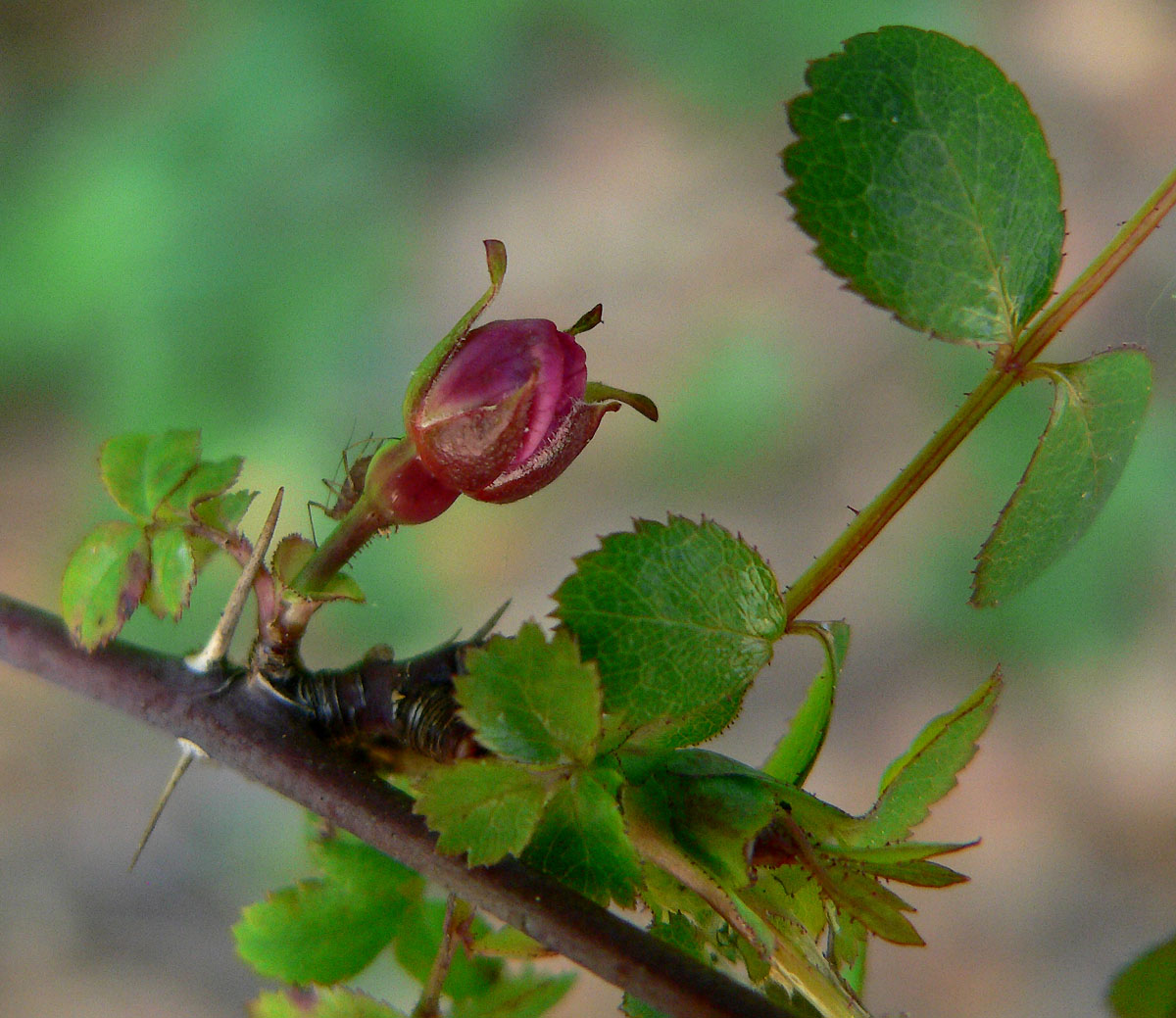
- Rosa pinetorum bud

Conservation status
- Imperiled (NatureServe)

Scientific classification
- Kingdom: Plantae
- Clade: Tracheophytes
- Clade: Angiosperms
- Clade: Eudicots
- Clade: Rosids
- Order: Rosales
- Family: Rosaceae
- Genus: Rosa
- Species: R. pinetorum

Binomial name
- Rosa pinetorum A.Heller

= Rosa pinetorum =

Species of flowering plant

Rosa pinetorum is an uncommon species of rose known by the common name pine rose. It is endemic to California, where it occurs in the coniferous forests of the Central Coast Ranges around Monterey Bay.

== Taxonomy ==
The taxonomy of this and related roses is difficult.
