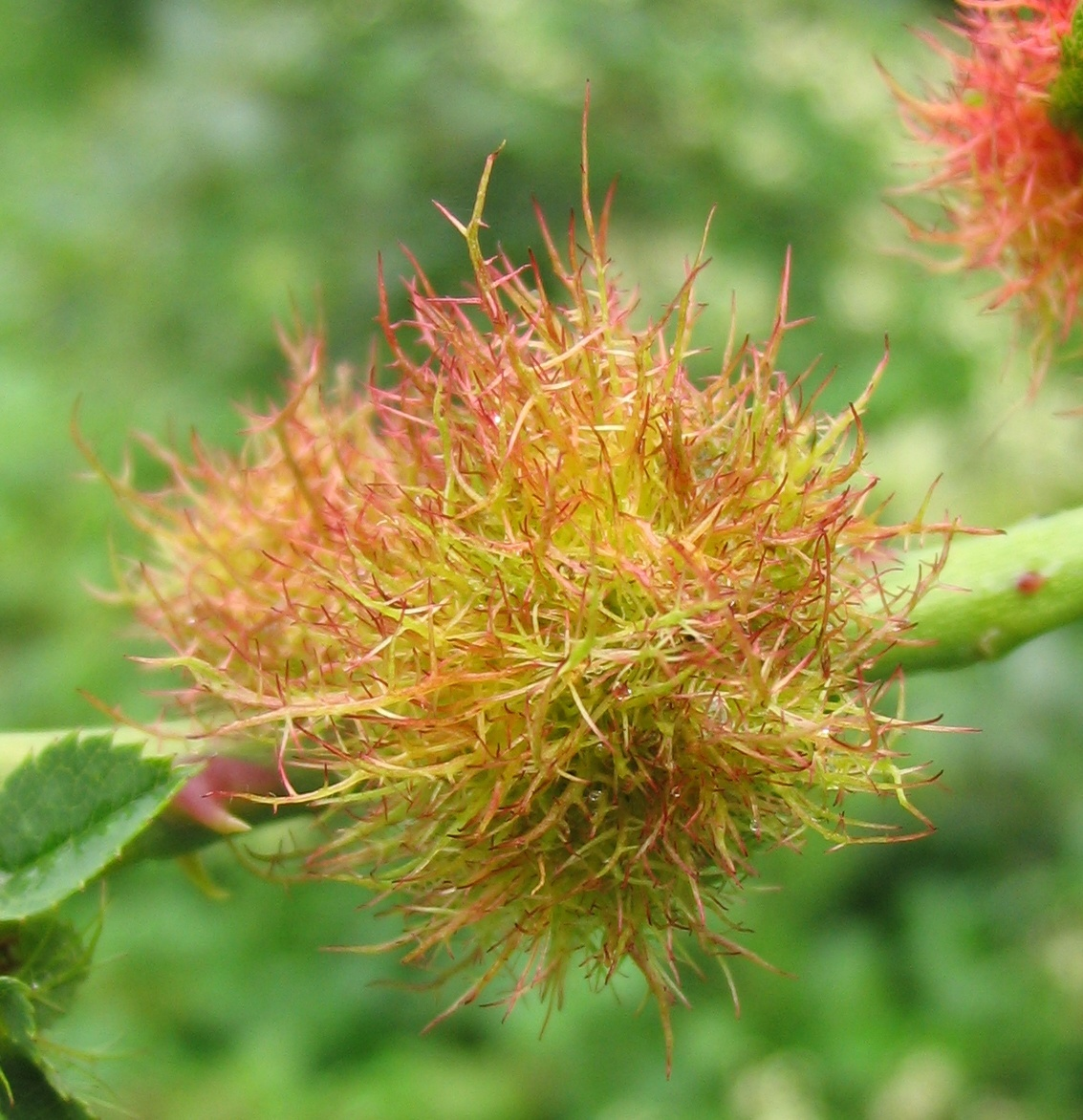
- Diplolepis rosae gall

Scientific classification
- Kingdom: Animalia
- Phylum: Arthropoda
- Clade: Pancrustacea
- Class: Insecta
- Order: Hymenoptera
- Family: Diplolepididae
- Subfamily: Diplolepidinae
- Genus: Diplolepis; Geoffroy, 1762

Synonyms
- Rhodites

= Diplolepis (wasp) =

Genus of wasps

Diplolepis is a genus of approximately fifty species of gall-inducing wasps in the family Diplolepididae. The larvae induce galls on wild roses (Rosa), and rarely on domestic roses.

== Description ==
Adults are small (3–6 mm, 0.12–0.24 in) with a strongly arched mesosoma giving them a hunched appearance. Coloration ranges from entirely orange to reddish-brown or black. Larvae are legless and cream-colored with a weakly defined head.

Galls formed by a given species can usually be distinguished from those of other species by the shape, size, placement, and ornamentation (smooth or spiny) of the gall, together with the identity of the host plant. However, gall morphology can be modified by the presence of inquilines and parasitoids. Some species induce galls on leaves, while others induce galls on stems or adventitious shoots. Depending on the species of wasp, galls may be single-chambered or multi-chambered, and detachable or integral.

== Range ==
Diplolepis species occur throughout the holarctic region. While most described species are in the nearctic, it is likely many species remain to be discovered and described, particularly in the eastern palearctic.

== Life cycle ==
All Diplolepis species lay eggs and induce galls only on rose (Rosa) species, and are thus dependent on roses to complete their life cycle. There is only one generation per year. Adult emergence from galls coincides with the availability of suitable host plant tissue required for oviposition and gall formation; this can be in spring or later in summer depending on the species. The adult life span is 5–12 days, during which they mate and the females lay their eggs. Eggs are attached to 1-2 plant cells and gall formation begins before the eggs hatch. Larvae are entirely surrounded by their galls shortly after they begin feeding. Larvae remain in their galls during the summer while feeding on gall tissue, and mature by late summer. They overwinter in their galls as pre-pupae; they complete pupation in spring and the adults chew their way out of the galls.

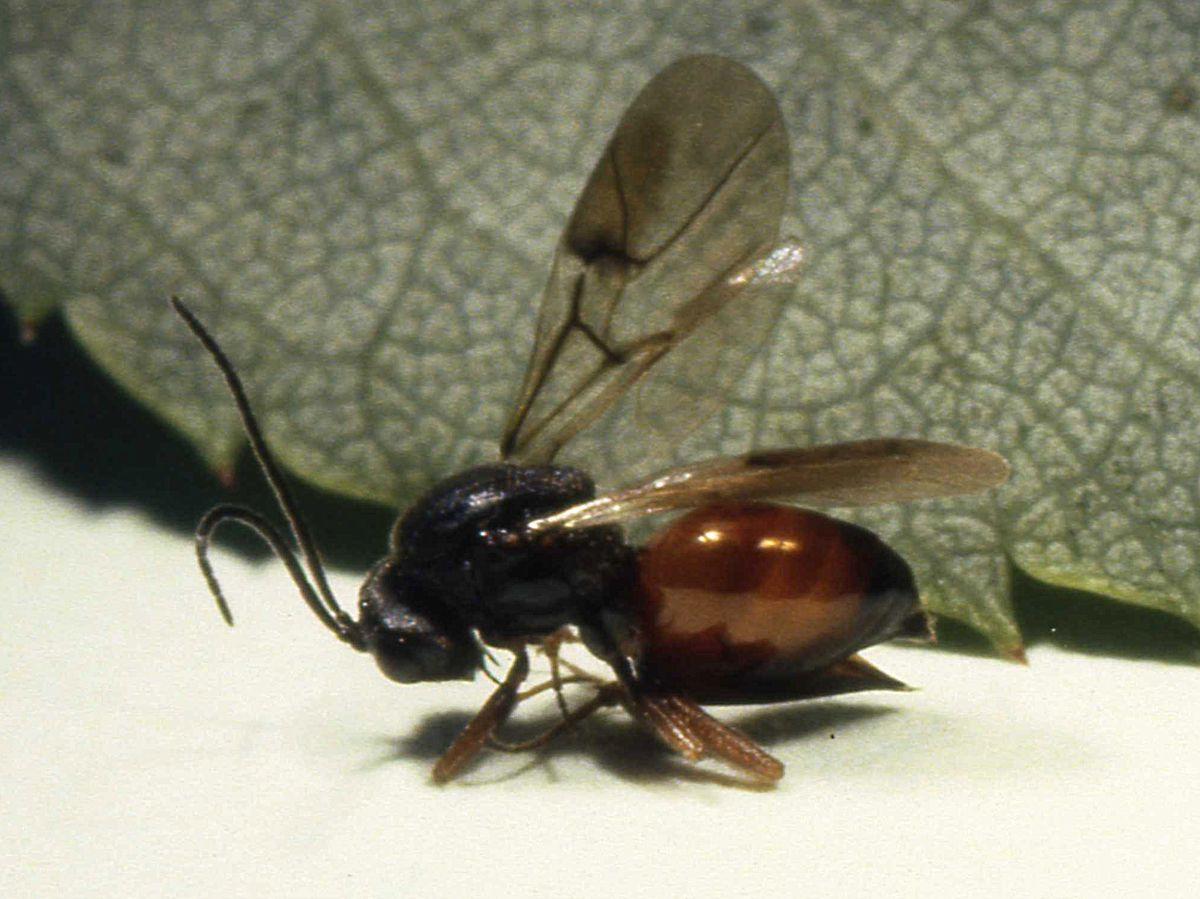
Diplolepis rosae adult

== Inquilines and parasitoids ==
The galls of nearly all Diplolepis species are known to host inquilines - species that invade and occupy a gall but do not feed on the larva of the inducing species, though the inducing larva often dies as a result of the activity of the inquiline. Species of the gall wasp genus Periclistus are the most common inquiline species found in Diplolepis galls and may occupy over half the Diplolepis galls produced in a given year.

The larvae of both the gall-inducing Diplolepis species and the inquilines (if present) are used as hosts by a number of parasitoid wasps, including wasps from the families Eulophidae, Eupelmidae, Eurytomidae, Ormyridae, Pteromalidae, Torymidae, and Ichneumonidae.

== Taxonomy ==
The name 'Diplolepis' was first used for this group by Etienne-Louis Geoffroy in 1762. The genus is monophyletic and, with Liebelia, constitutes the subfamily Diplolepidinae. This subfamily was previously considered a tribe - Diplolepidini - of the gall wasp family Cynipidae. There are currently about 50 described species in the genus, including:

- Diplolepis abei Pujade-Villar & Wang, 2020
- Diplolepis arefacta
- Diplolepis ashmeadi
- Diplolepis bassetti
- Diplolepis bicolor
- Diplolepis californica
- Diplolepis dichlocera
- Diplolepis eglanteriae
- Diplolepis flaviabdomenis
- Diplolepis fructuum
- Diplolepis fulgens
- Diplolepis fusiformans
- Diplolepis gracilis
- Diplolepis hunanensis
- Diplolepis ignota
- Diplolepis inconspicuis
- Diplolepis japonica
- Diplolepis lens
- Diplolepis mayri
- Diplolepis minoriabdomenis
- Diplolepis nebulosa
- Diplolepis neglecta
- Diplolepis nervosa
- Diplolepis nezha Hu, Zhang, McCormack & Fang, 2025
- Diplolepis nigriceps
- Diplolepis ningdaensis
- Diplolepis nitida
- Diplolepis nodulosa
- Diplolepis ogawai Abe and Ide, 2023
- Diplolepis oregonensis
- Diplolepis ostensackeni
- Diplolepis polita
- Diplolepis pustulatoides
- Diplolepis radicum
- Diplolepis radoszkowskii
- Diplolepis rosae
- Diplolepis rosaefolii
- Diplolepis similis
- Diplolepis spinosa
- Diplolepis spinosissimae
- Diplolepis terrigena
- Diplolepis triforma
- Diplolepis tuberculatrix
- Diplolepis tumida
- Diplolepis valtonyci Zhu, Wang Pujade-Villar, 2021
- Diplolepis variabilis
- Diplolepis variegata
- Diplolepis verna
- Diplolepis weldi
