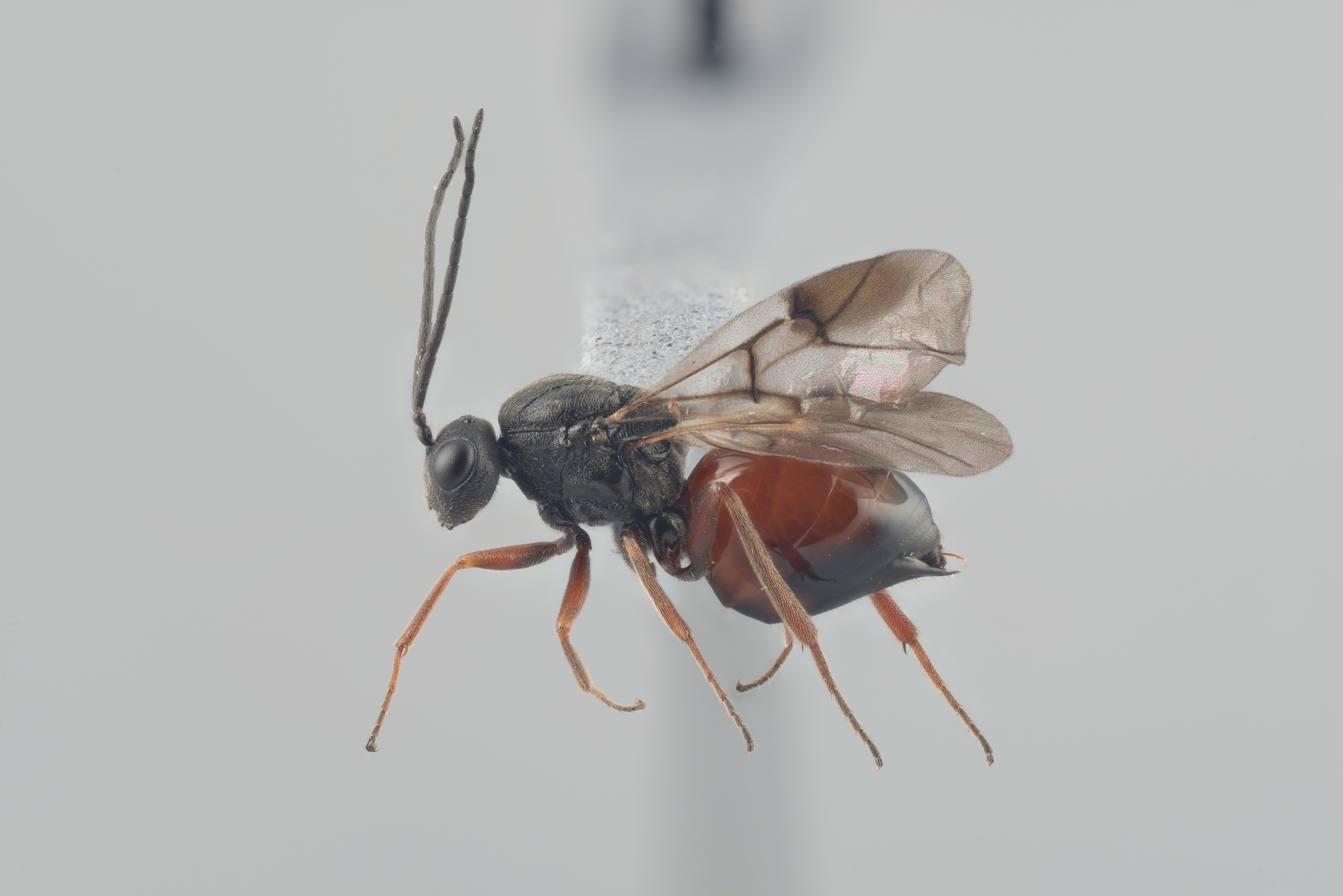
- Naturalized female Diplolepis rosae specimen.

Scientific classification
- Kingdom: Animalia
- Phylum: Arthropoda
- Class: Insecta
- Order: Hymenoptera
- Family: Diplolepididae
- Genus: Diplolepis
- Species: D. rosae

Binomial name
- Diplolepis rosae (Linnaeus, 1758)

Synonyms
- Diplolepips bedeguaris; Rhodites rosae; Cynips rosae

= Diplolepis rosae =

Species of wasp that causes Robin's pincushion galls on roseea

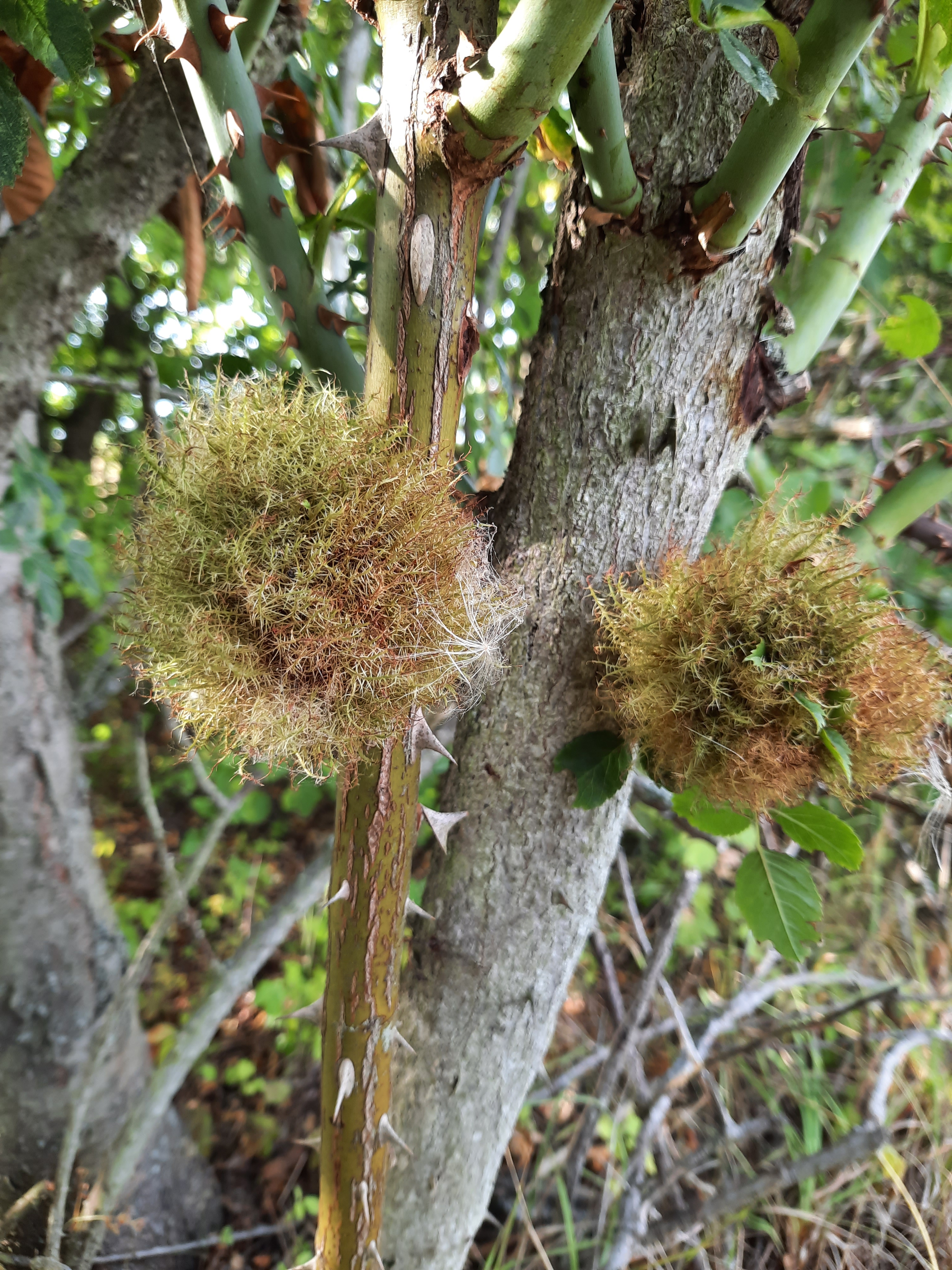
Mature gall on a dog rose

Diplolepis rosae is a gall wasp which causes a gall known as the rose bedeguar gall, robin's pincushion, mossy rose gall, or simply moss gall. The gall develops as a chemically induced distortion of an unopened leaf axillary or terminal bud, mostly on field rose (Rosa arvensis) or dog rose (Rosa canina) shrubs. The female wasp lays up to 60 eggs within each leaf bud using her ovipositor. The grubs develop within the gall, and the wasps emerge in spring; the wasp is parthenogenetic with fewer than one percent being males.

A similar gall is caused by Diplolepis mayri, but this is much less common.

== Names ==
Being so prominent and interesting in appearance, this gall has more folklore attached to it than most. The term 'Bedeguar, Bedegar or Bedequar' comes from a French word, bédégar, and is ultimately from the Persian, bād-āwar, meaning 'wind-brought'. Robin in Robin's pincushion refers to the woodland sprite of English folklore, Robin Goodfellow.

== Description ==
=== Insect ===
The female is about 4 mm (0.16 in) long. Parts of the abdomen and legs are yellow-red, while the rest of the body is black. The male is black and lacks the hypopygium structure which clearly identifies the species in the female. Its legs are bicoloured yellow and has a body length of about 3 mm (0.12 in).

=== Gall ===
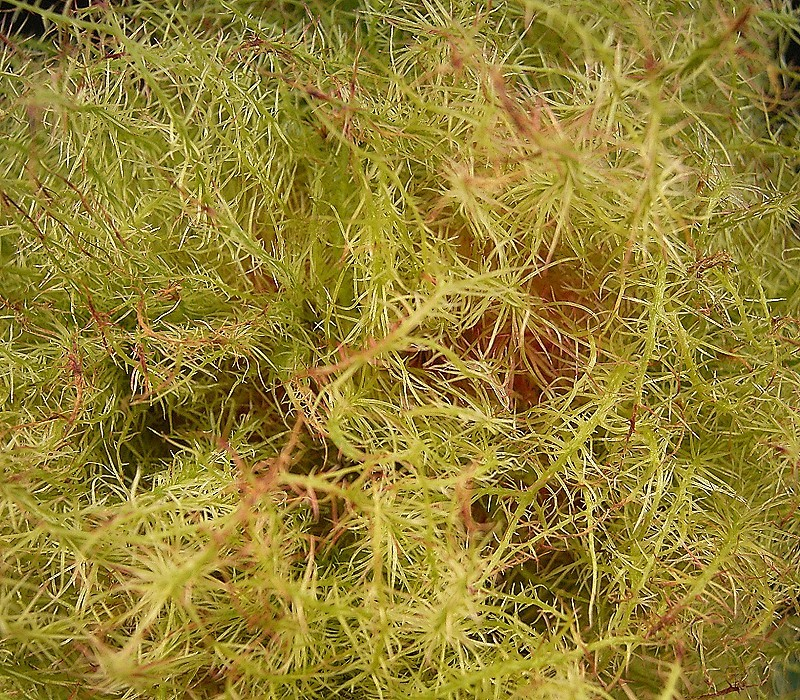
Fine detail of the branched filaments of the gall

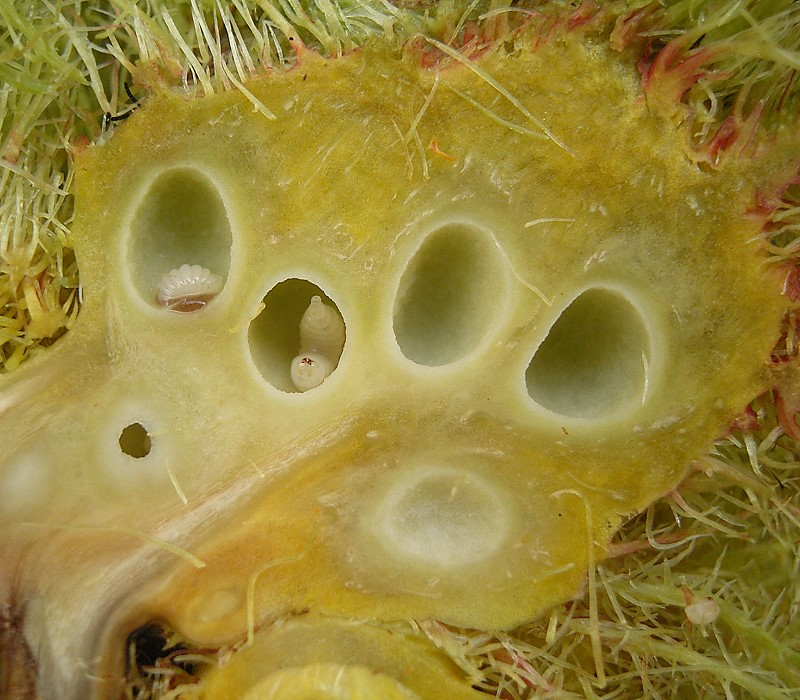
A section through a young gall showing the larvae and cells

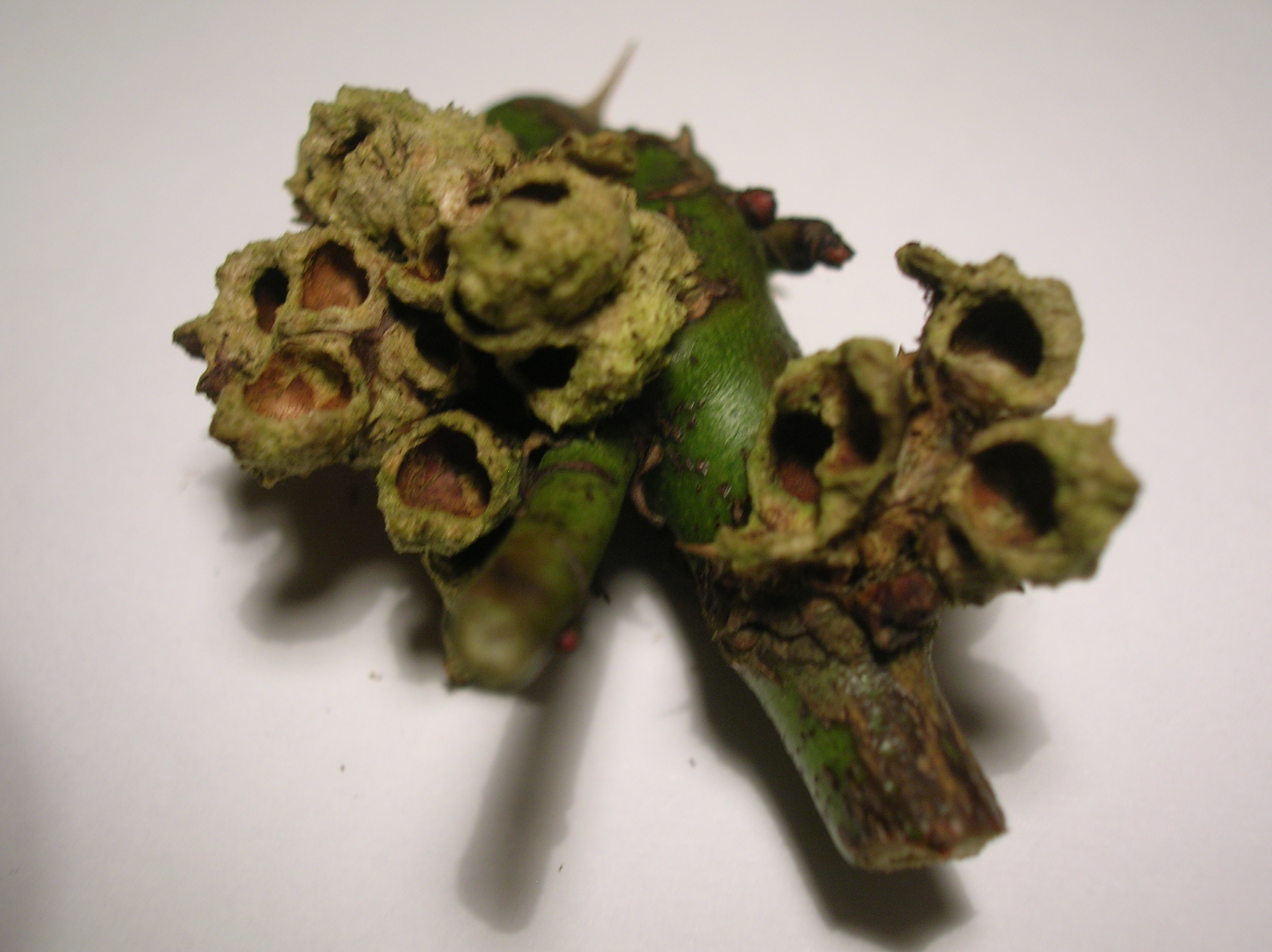
Rose bedeguar showing the emergence and / or possible predation holes of the gall fly 'cells'

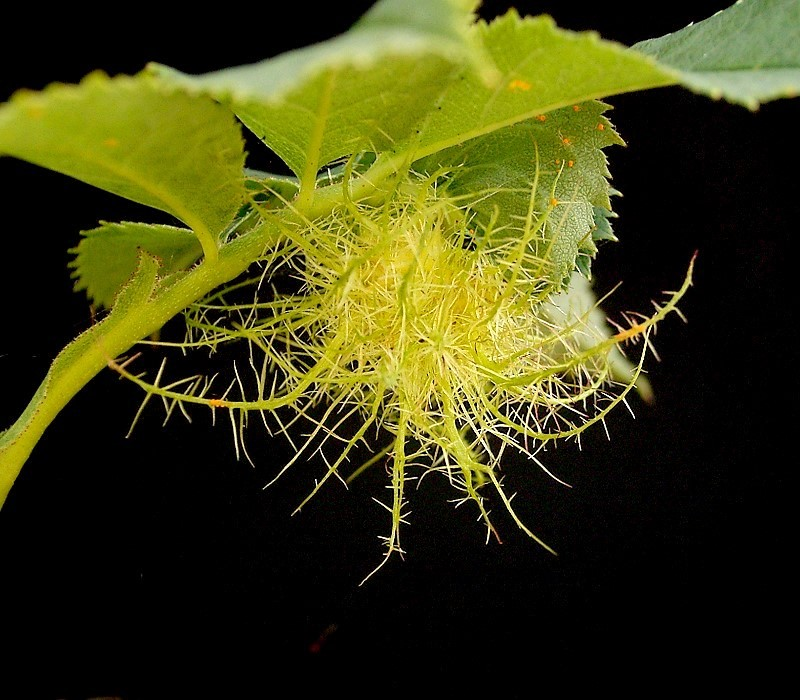
An early stage in the development of the gall

Some insects create their own microhabitats by forming a plant structure called a gall, made up of plant tissue, but controlled by the insect. A gall acts as both a habitat and food source for the maker of the gall. The interior of a bedeguar gall is formed from the bud, and is composed of edible nutritious and structural tissues. Some galls act as "physiologic sinks", concentrating resources in the gall from the surrounding plant parts. Galls may also provide the insect with some physical protection from predators.

The bedeguar gall is surrounded by a dense mass of sticky branched filaments. This structure gives the appearance of a ball of moss, and its filaments are often brightly colored, being at their best around September; starting off green and then passing through pink and crimson to reddish brown. A large specimen can be up to 10 cm (4 in) in width. The larvae develop and then overwinter as pupae in the now brown and dry-looking structure, emerging in May. The unilarval chambers are set in a woody core which persists after the filaments have worn off.

The bedeguar may also develop on Rosa rubiginosa, R. dumalis, or R. rubrifolia.

The gall induced by D. mayri differs in being more sparsely covered in short, unbranched filaments and the galls usually develop on the twigs.

== Lifecycle ==
A week after the egg has been laid, the larva hatches and begins to feed on the leaf bud tissue. This activity stimulates (in a way not yet understood) the development by the host plant of enlarged 'nutritive' cells in the area around the growing larva. These are fed on by the larva and are continually replaced by new cells. Further concentric layers of tissues develop around the core nutritive tissue and come to form the structure known as the bedeguar, complete with the outermost and characteristic fibrous outgrowths that give the gall its alternative name of Robin's pincushion. As the larva feeds and grows within this gall, it probably undergoes five larval instar stages (the growth stages between moults). The final instar stage is reached by late October. The larva ceases feeding. It now passes into the prepupal stage, in which form it overwinters inside the gall. In the following February or March, the prepupa undergoes a final moult and becomes a pupa. Through the thin, transparent skin of the pupa, it is possible to see the fully formed antennae, legs, wings and body segments of the adult wasp. The adults begin to emerge from the old galls, which are still attached to the rose, in May. Emergences may continue through to August.

As stated earlier, the adult wasps which start to emerge from the rose bedeguar will be mostly female, and these females will go on to lay eggs through parthenogenesis. No alternation of generations exists in this species. Males are known, but are very rare. One possible reason for this scarcity is the presence of a bacterium in the genus Wolbachia, which is endosymbiotic in the females' gametes. A female infected with Wolbachia produces only diploid eggs, when in the cells of the ovaries presumably cause the fusion of the pronuclei, which leads to entirely female progeny. When the females were treated with antibiotics, they were then able to produce normal male and female eggs.

== Predators, inquilines, parasites, hyperparasites and fungi ==
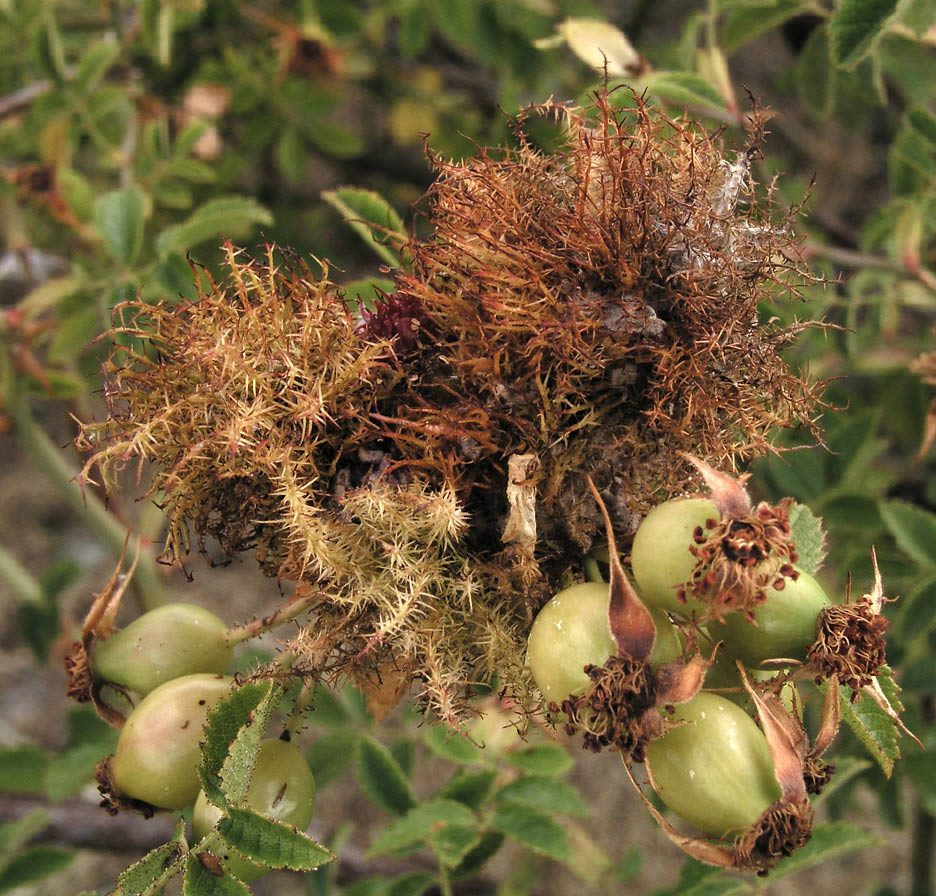
A gall in late autumn prior to the emergence of the gall flies

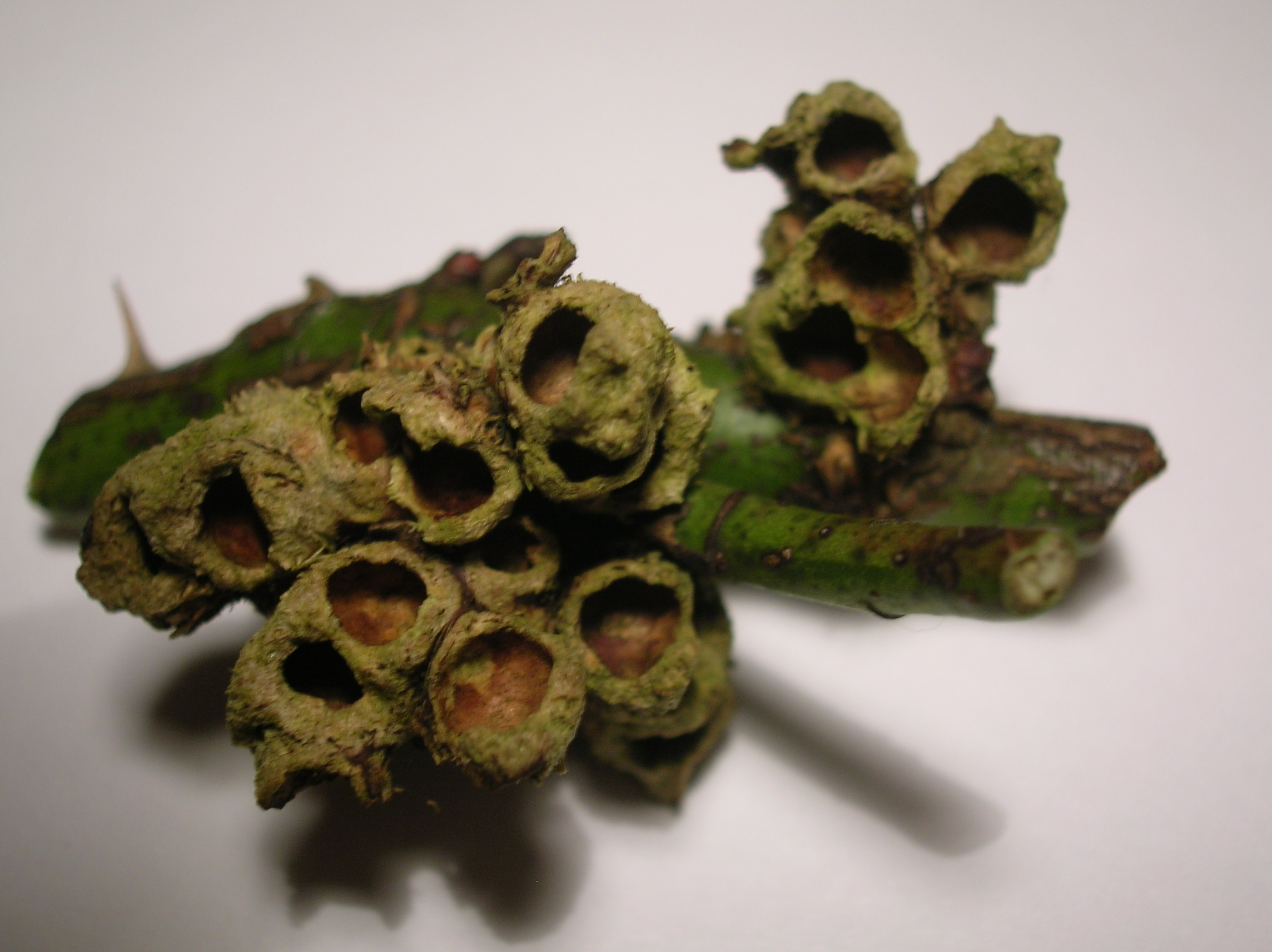
Closeup of vacated or predated galls cells

Mature galls are sometimes broken open by vertebrate predators to recover the larvae or pupae. The large size of the emergence holes of the individual cells sometimes suggests predation by birds or small mammals has taken place.

The bedeguar is a good example of a complex community of insects. The cynipid wasp Periclistus brandtii is an inquiline that lives harmlessly within the bedeguar gall and like Diplolepis rosae itself, is often parasitised by insects referred to as parasitoids or even by hyperparasitoids in some cases.

The gall-wasp Periclistus brandtii causes no gall itself, but deposits its eggs in the bedeguar tissues on which the larvae feed. In turn, these larvae may be parasitised by a eurytomid wasp, Eurytoma rosae, which works its way from one inquiline's cell to the next. The parasitoid ichneumon Orthopelma mediator lays its eggs directly into larvae of D. rosae, killing them. The wasps Eurytoma rosae and Glyphomerus stigma can attack both the larvae of D. rosae and of the inquiline P. brandtii. These parasitoids may in turn be attacked by hyperparasitoids such as Caenacis inflexa and Pteromalus bedeguaris. The mossy and sticky filaments of the gall are clearly ineffective in preventing the entry of inquilines, predators, parasitoids and hyperparasitoids.

The tissues of the bedeguar gall are frequently attacked by the parasitic fungus Phragmidium subcorticum, more so than the other parts of the host rose plant.

== Infestations ==
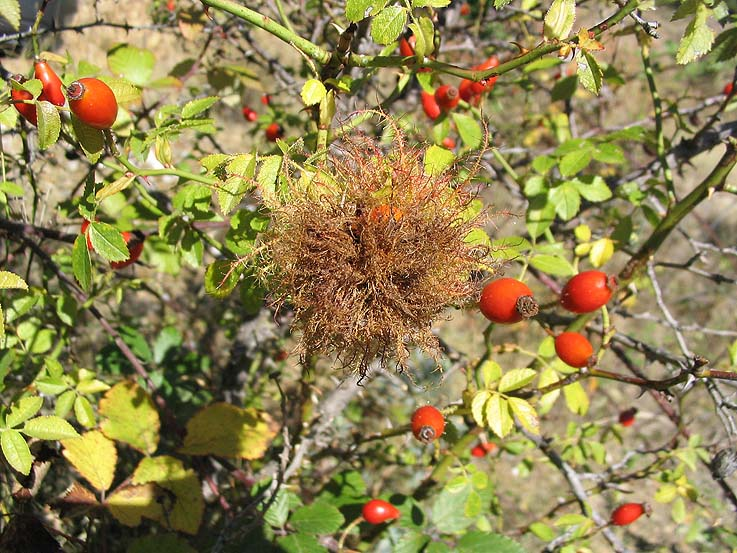
Rose bedeguar galls and rose hips in autumn

The galls occur more commonly on plants under stress, i.e. very dry conditions, waterlogging or hedge cutting, whereas vigorously growing plants are less commonly found to have galls. Whether the vigorous plant suppresses gall formation or is avoided by the wasp in favor of easier targets is unknown. Young and damaged plants tend to produce larger and more numerous galls than old and intact ones. In the latter, many eggs are laid, but the number of galls formed is relatively few.

The relative number of parasitoids decreases with increasing gall volume. And the closer the gall is to the ground, the greater the total number of adults that emerge. Thus, it seems more effective for a female D. rosae to induce larger galls on lower branches of the shrubs to increase the survival probability of the offspring. The distances from margins of shrubs, however, affects neither the parasitoid ratio of galls nor the volume of the galls.

Removing and destroying galls before they dry and the wasps emerge may help to reduce the infestation. While fairly large, and sometimes present in quite large numbers on scrub specimens, they cause no measurable harm.
