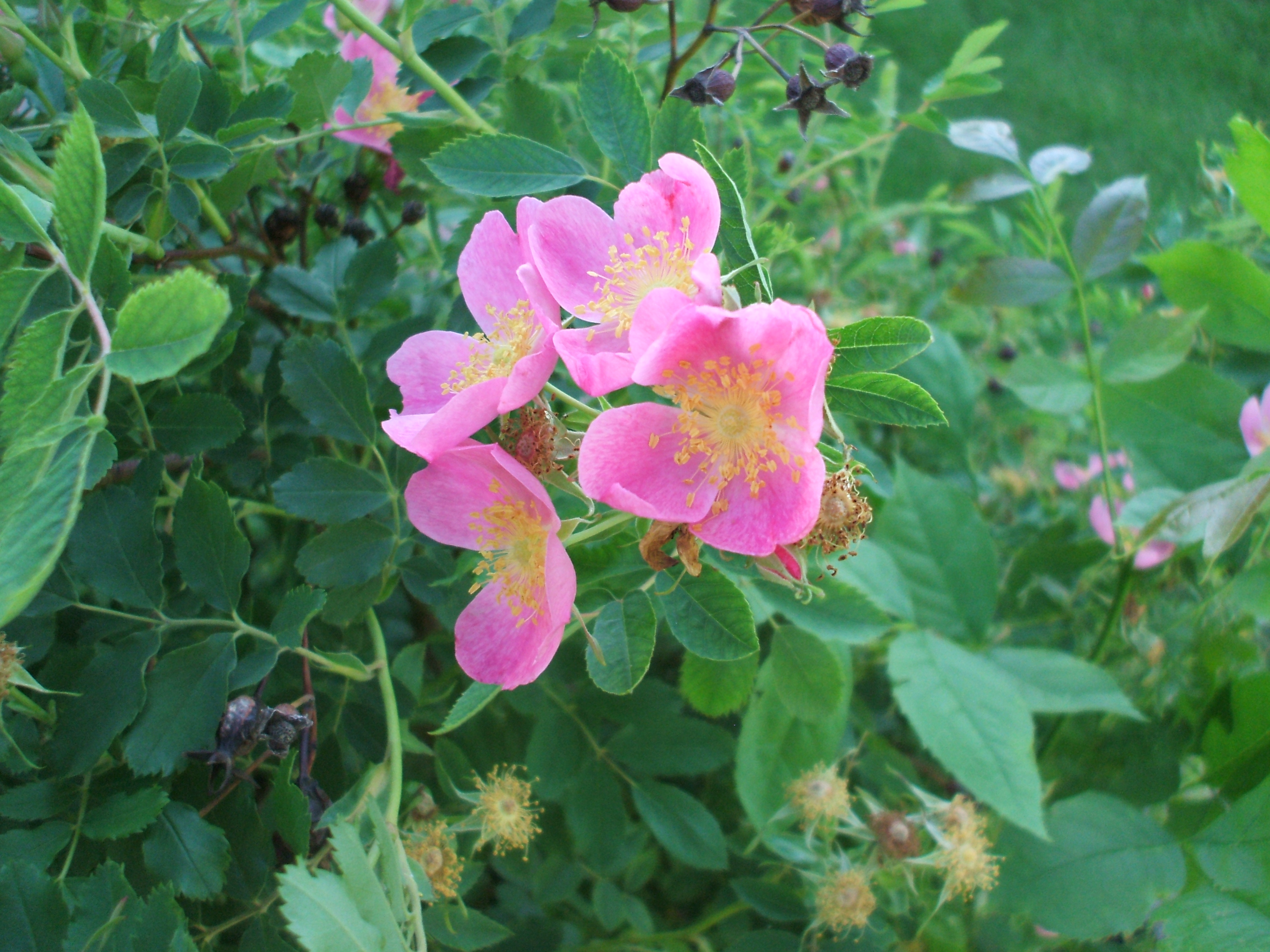

Scientific classification
- Kingdom: Plantae
- Clade: Tracheophytes
- Clade: Angiosperms
- Clade: Eudicots
- Clade: Rosids
- Order: Rosales
- Family: Rosaceae
- Genus: Rosa
- Species: R. arkansana

Binomial name
- Rosa arkansana Porter

Synonyms
- Rosa pratincola; Rosa suffulta; Rosa suffulta var. relicta

= Rosa arkansana =

Species of flowering plant

Rosa arkansana, the prairie rose or wild prairie rose, is a species of rose native to a large area of central North America, between the Appalachian and Rocky Mountains from Alberta, Manitoba, and Saskatchewan south to New Mexico, Texas and Indiana. There are two varieties:

- Rosa arkansana var. arkansana
- Rosa arkansana var. suffulta (Greene) Cockerell

The name Rosa arkansana comes from the Arkansas River in Colorado. The species' wide distribution and consequent genetic drift has led to an extensive synonymy. It is a perennial subshrub and its native habitats include prairies, roadsides, and ditches. The plant attracts butterflies and birds.

The name prairie rose is also sometimes applied to Rosa blanda, also known as the meadow rose or smooth rose, which is also widely spread, but somewhat further to the north.

== Symbolism ==
Wild rose is the state flower of the U.S. states of Iowa and North Dakota. In Iowa, convention states the species is Rosa pratincola (currently treated as a synonym of Rosa arkansana). North Dakota, on the other hand, specifies either Rosa arkansana or Rosa blanda. Alberta's "wild rose" is Rosa acicularis.

== Cultivation ==
Rosa arkansana is grown as an ornamental plant, and has become naturalized in parts of Massachusetts, New York, and North Dakota.
