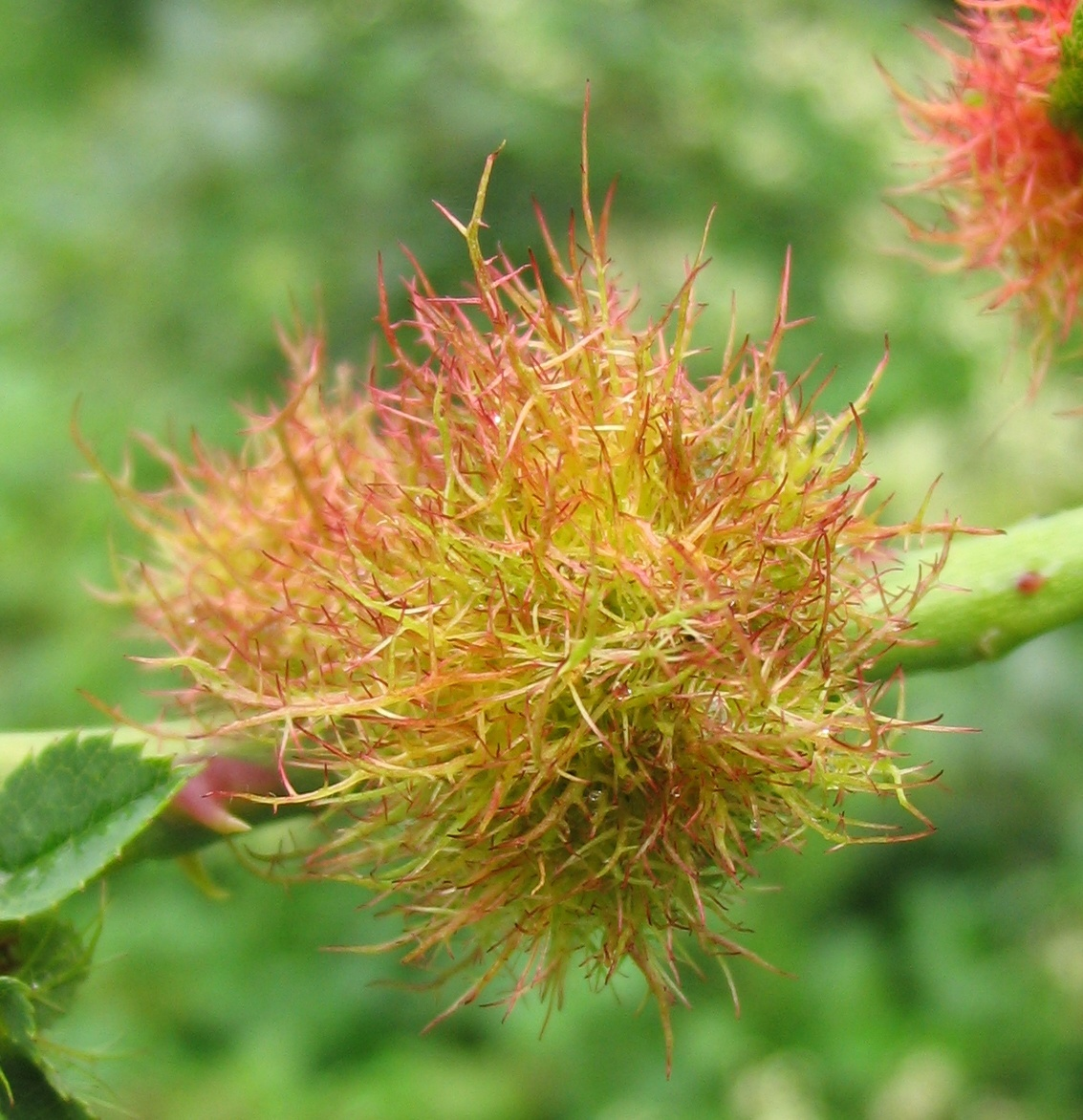
- Diplolepis rosae gall

Scientific classification
- Kingdom: Animalia
- Phylum: Arthropoda
- Clade: Pancrustacea
- Class: Insecta
- Order: Hymenoptera
- Superfamily: Cynipoidea
- Family: Diplolepididae; Latreille, 1802

Genera
- Diplolepis Geoffroy, 1762; Liebelia Kieffer, 1903; Pediaspis Tischbein, 1852; Himalocynips Yoshimoto, 1970

= Diplolepididae =

Family of insects

Diplolepididae is a family of small gall-inducing wasps. Until recently these wasps were included in the gall wasp family (Cynipidae) but were moved to their own family based on genetic and morphological features. It contains two subfamilies: Diplolepidinae and Pediaspidinae.

Diplolepidinae includes about 60 species in two genera (Diplolepis and Liebelia), all of which induce galls on roses in which the larvae live and feed. This subfamily was formerly included in Cynipidae as the tribe Diplolepidini.

Pediaspidinae is composed of two monotypic genera: Himalocynips and Pediaspis. The biology of this subfamily is poorly known, though Pediaspis aceris induces galls on a species of maple. This subfamily was formerly included in Cynipidae as the tribe Pediaspini.
