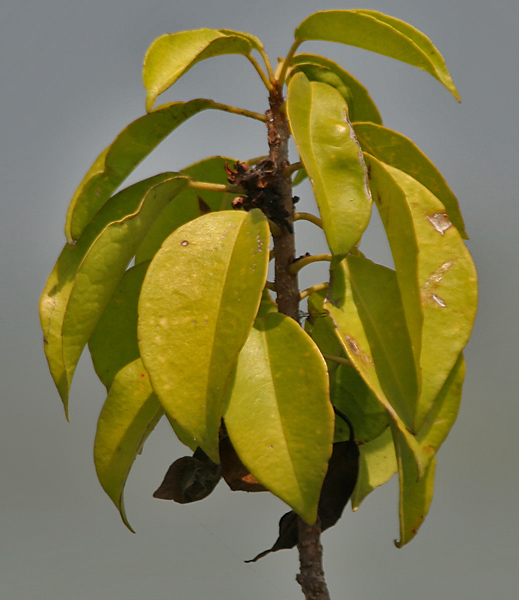
- Excoecaria agallocha in Krishna Wildlife Sanctuary, Andhra Pradesh, India

Scientific classification
- Kingdom: Plantae
- Clade: Tracheophytes
- Clade: Angiosperms
- Clade: Eudicots
- Clade: Rosids
- Order: Malpighiales
- Family: Euphorbiaceae
- Subfamily: Euphorbioideae
- Tribe: Hippomaneae
- Subtribe: Hippomaninae
- Genus: Excoecaria; L.

Species
- See text

Synonyms
- Commia Lour.; Glyphostylus Gagnep.; Taeniosapium Müll.Arg.

= Excoecaria =

Genus of plants

Excoecaria is a plant genus of the family Euphorbiaceae, formally described by Linnaeus in 1759. The genus is native to the Old World Tropics (Africa, southern Asia, northern Australia, and assorted oceanic islands).

== Etymology ==
Genus name, Excoecaria, is from the Latin word excaeco, which means "to blind" and refers to the sap of the plants that can cause temporary blindness.

== Toxic latex ==
The milky latex of Excoecaria agallocha, also known as Thillai, milky mangrove, blind-your-eye mangrove and river poison tree, is poisonous. Mangroves of this plant surround the ancient Thillai Chidambaram Temple in Tamil Nadu. Contact with skin can cause irritation and rapid blistering; contact with eyes will result in temporary blindness. It is distributed in the Pichavaram wetlands, near Chidambaram India, in Australia from northern New South Wales, along the northern coastline around to Western Australia.The latex is extremely poisonous. Even dried and powdered leaves contain the poison which can kill fish very quickly.

== Species list ==
The list of currently recognized species in this genus.

1. Excoecaria acerifolia - Uttarakhand, Yunnan, Nepal, Sikkim, Bhutan
2. Excoecaria acuminata - Fiji
3. Excoecaria agallocha - S China, Indian Subcontinent, SE Asia, Papuasia, N Australia, W Pacific Is
4. Excoecaria antsingyensis - Madagascar
5. Excoecaria aporusifolia - Vietnam
6. Excoecaria bantamensis - S Thailand, Philippines, Java, Kalimantan Barat
7. Excoecaria benthamiana - Seychelles
8. Excoecaria borneensis - Borneo, Sumatra, Philippines, Sulawesi, Maluku
9. Excoecaria bussei - E + S Africa
10. Excoecaria canjoerensis - India
11. Excoecaria cochinchinensis - S China, Indochina, W Malaysia
12. Excoecaria confertiflora - Viti Levu
13. Excoecaria cuspidata - Meghalaya
14. Excoecaria dallachyana - Queensland, New South Wales
15. Excoecaria formosana - Nansei-shoto, Taiwan
16. Excoecaria glaucescens - Madagascar
17. Excoecaria goudotiana - Madagascar
18. Excoecaria grahamii - W Africa
19. Excoecaria guineensis - W + C Africa
20. Excoecaria holophylla - Myanmar
21. Excoecaria kawakamii - Taiwan
22. Excoecaria laotica - Laos, Thailand
23. Excoecaria lissohylla - Madagascar
24. Excoecaria madagascariensis - Madagascar, E + SE + S Africa
25. Excoecaria magenjensis - Mozambique
26. Excoecaria obtusa - Philippines
27. Excoecaria oppositifolia - Indian Subcontinent, Indochina
28. Excoecaria pachyphylla - Philippines
29. Excoecaria parvifolia - N Australia
30. Excoecaria perrieri - Madagascar
31. Excoecaria philippinensis - Philippines, Sabah
32. Excoecaria poilanei - Vietnam
33. Excoecaria rectinervis - Nicobar Islands
34. Excoecaria simii - Cape Province, KwaZulu-Natal
35. Excoecaria stenophylla - Philippines
36. Excoecaria thouarsiana - Madagascar
37. Excoecaria venenata - S China
38. Excoecaria yunnanensis - Yunnan

== Former species ==
These species were once included in Excoecaria but are not now consider members of this genus. They have been moved to these other genera: Actinostemon, Adenopeltis, Alchornea, Anomostachys, Bocquillonia, Bonania, Cerbera, Falconeria, Grimmeodendron, Gymnanthes, Homalanthus, Maprounea, Microstachys, Neoshirakia, Sapium, Sclerocroton, Sebastiania, Shirakiopsis, Spirostachys, Stillingia, and Triadica.

1. E. abyssinica - Shirakiopsis elliptica
2. E. aerea - Sapium glandulosum
3. E. africana - Spirostachys africana
4. E. albicans - Gymnanthes albicans
5. E. arguta - Sapium argutum
6. E. baccata - Balakata baccata
7. E. bicalcarata - Sebastiania bicalcarata
8. E. biglandulosa - Sapium glandulosum
9. E. bodenbenderi - Stillingia bodenbenderi
10. E. brachyandra - Actinostemon brachypodus
11. E. brachypoda - Actinostemon brachypodus
12. E. brasiliensis - Sebastiania brasiliensis
13. E. bridgesii - Sebastiania bridgesii
14. E. caribaea - Actinostemon caribaeus
15. E. chamelaea - Microstachys chamaelea
16. E. colliguaya - Adenopeltis serrata
17. E. concolor - Actinostemon concolor
18. E. cubensis - Bonania cubana
19. E. cuneata - Sapium cuneatum
20. E. discolor - Sebastiania klotzschiana
21. E. diversifolia - Shirakiopsis indica
22. E. eglandulata - Sebastiania eglandulata
23. E. eglandulosa - Grimmeodendron eglandulosum
24. E. emarginata - Bonania emarginata
25. E. erythrosperma - Bonania erythrosperma
26. E. faradianensis - Microstachys faradianensis
27. E. farinosa - Gymnanthes farinosa
28. E. glandulosa - Gymnanthes glandulosa
29. E. glauca - Shirakiopsis indica
30. E. glomeriflora - Spirostachys venenifera
31. E. guianensis - Maprounea guianensis
32. E. haematosperma - Sapium haematospermum
33. E. hippophaifolia - Sebastiania schottiana
34. E. hochstetteriana - Sclerocroton integerrimus
35. E. indica - Shirakiopsis indica
36. E. insignis - Falconeria insignis
37. E. integerrima - Sclerocroton integerrimus
38. E. japonica - Neoshirakia japonica
39. E. klotzschii - Actinostemon klotzschii
40. E. laevis - Homalanthus populneus
41. E. lanceolaria - Triadica cochinchinensis
42. E. lastellei - Anomostachys lastellei
43. E. laurocerasus - Sapium laurocerasus
44. E. leucogyna - Sapium leucogynum
45. E. leucosperma - Sapium leucogynum
46. E. lucida - Gymnanthes lucida
47. E. macrocarpa - Sapium macrocarpum
48. E. manniana - Shirakiopsis elliptica
49. E. marginata - Sapium glandulosum
50. E. martii - Sapium obovatum
51. E. mauritiana - Stillingia lineata
52. E. melanosticta - Sclerocroton melanostictus
53. E. myricifolia - Bonania myricifolia
54. E. oblongifolia - Sclerocroton oblongifolius
55. E. obovata - Sapium obovatum
56. E. obtusifolia - Sebastiania obtusifolia
57. E. obtusiloba - Sapium glandulosum
58. E. occidentalis - Sapium glandulosum
59. E. ovatifolia - Cerbera odollam
60. E. pallens - Gymnanthes pallens
61. E. pallida - Sapium pallidum
62. E. potamophila - Sebastiania potamophila
63. E. reticulata - Sclerocroton integerrimus
64. E. rhomboidea - Bocquillonia rhomboidea
65. E. riparia - Gymnanthes riparia
66. E. sagrae - Grimmeodendron eglandulosum
67. E. salpingadenia - Stillingia salpingadenia
68. E. sebifera - Triadica sebifera
69. E. serrata - Adenopeltis serrata
70. E. serrulata - Gymnanthes gaudichaudii
71. E. sicca - Alchornea sicca
72. E. stylaris - Sapium stylare
73. E. suberosa - Sapium glandulosum
74. E. subsessilis - Sebastiania subsessilis
75. E. subulata - Sebastiania subulata
76. E. sylvatica - Stillingia sylvatica
77. E. synonym - Spirostachys africana
78. E. tenax - Gymnanthes pallens
79. E. tijueensis - Sapium haematospermum
80. E. tinifolia - Gymnanthes elliptica
81. E. tristis - Sapium argutum
82. E. unequidentata - Bocquillonia rhomboidea
83. E. venenifera - Spirostachys venenifera
84. E. venulosa - Gymnanthes albicans
85. E. virgata - Shirakiopsis virgata
86. E. warmingii - Sebastiania warmingii
