= H. spinosa =

H. spinosa may refer to:

- Halocynthia spinosa, a tunicate species in the genus Halocynthia
- Harmothoe spinosa, a marine worm species in the genus Harmothoe
- Harpactirella spinosa, a baboon spider species in the genus Harpactirella
- Heosemys spinosa, a turtle species
- Hippomane spinosa, a flowering plant species
- Hormathophylla spinosa, a flowering plant species in the genus Hormathophylla
- Hydroptila spinosa, a microcaddisfly species in the genus Hydroptila

== See also ==
- Spinosa (disambiguation)
