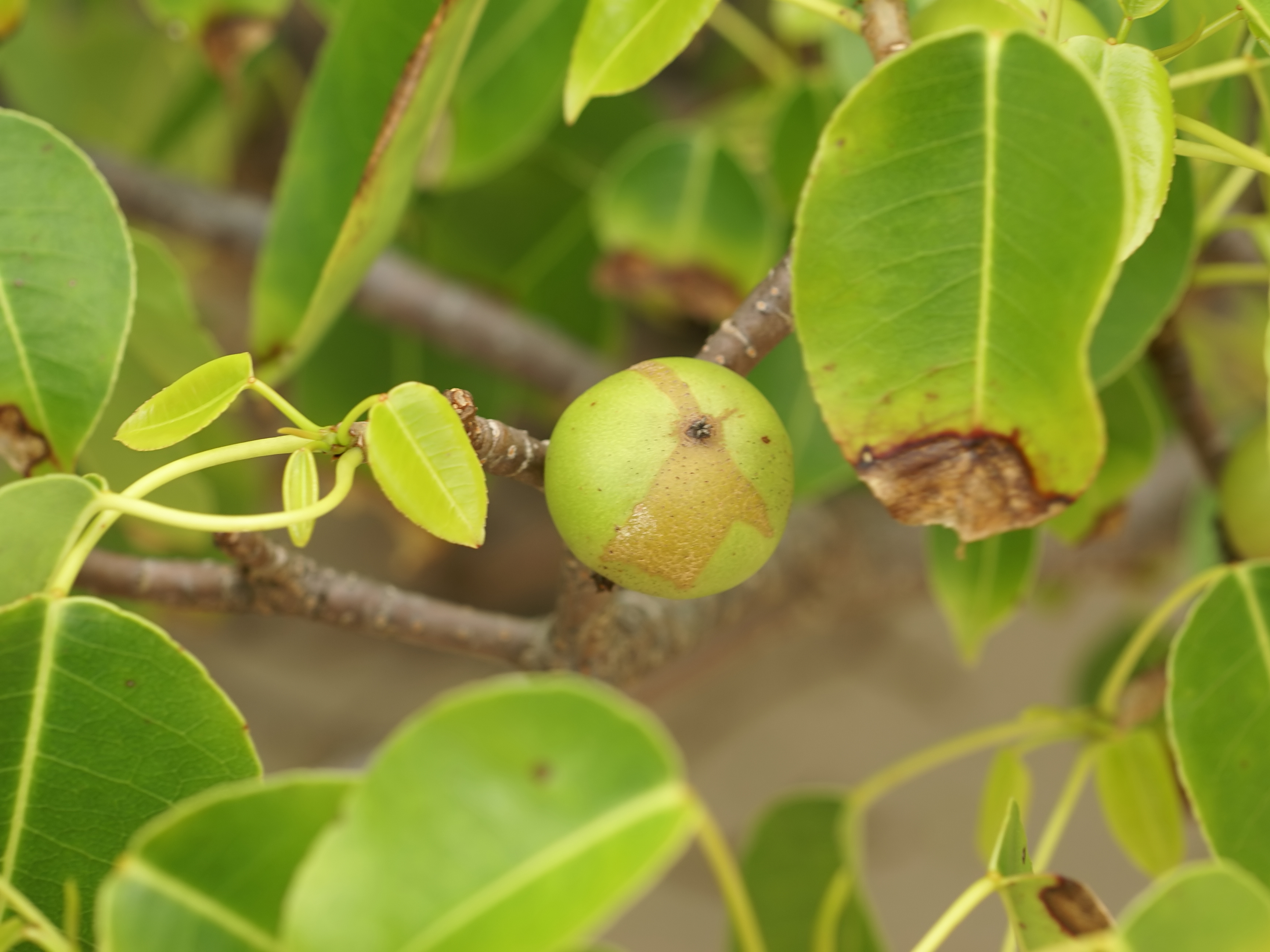
- Hippomane mancinella

Scientific classification
- Kingdom: Plantae
- Clade: Tracheophytes
- Clade: Angiosperms
- Clade: Eudicots
- Clade: Rosids
- Order: Malpighiales
- Family: Euphorbiaceae
- Subfamily: Euphorbioideae
- Tribe: Hippomaneae
- Subtribe: Hippomaninae
- Genus: Hippomane; L.

Type species
- Hippomane mancinella L.

Synonyms
- Mancanilla Plum. ex Adans.; Mancinella Tussac

= Hippomane =

Genus of flowering plants

Hippomane is a genus of plants in the Euphorbiaceae described by Linnaeus in 1753. It is native to the West Indies, Central America, Mexico, Florida, Venezuela, Colombia, and Galápagos.

== Derivation of name ==
The name of the genus references the Greek name hippomanes (applied by Theophrastus to an unidentified plant said to poison horses, sending them mad) - this being a compound of the Greek elements ἵππος (= (h)ippos) horse and μανία (= mania) insanity / frenzy - hence "sending horses insane".

== Species ==
Accepted Species

1. Hippomane horrida Urb. & Ekman. - Barahona in Dominican Rep
2. Hippomane mancinella L. - West Indies, Mexico, Central America, Florida Keys, Venezuela, Colombia, Galápagos
3. Hippomane spinosa L. - Hispaniola

Species formerly included

moved to other genera: Sapium

1. Hippomane aucuparia - Sapium glandulosum
2. Hippomane biglandulosa - Sapium glandulosum
3. Hippomane fruticosa - Sapium glandulosum
4. Hippomane glandulosa - Sapium glandulosum
5. Hippomane zeocca - Sapium glandulosum
