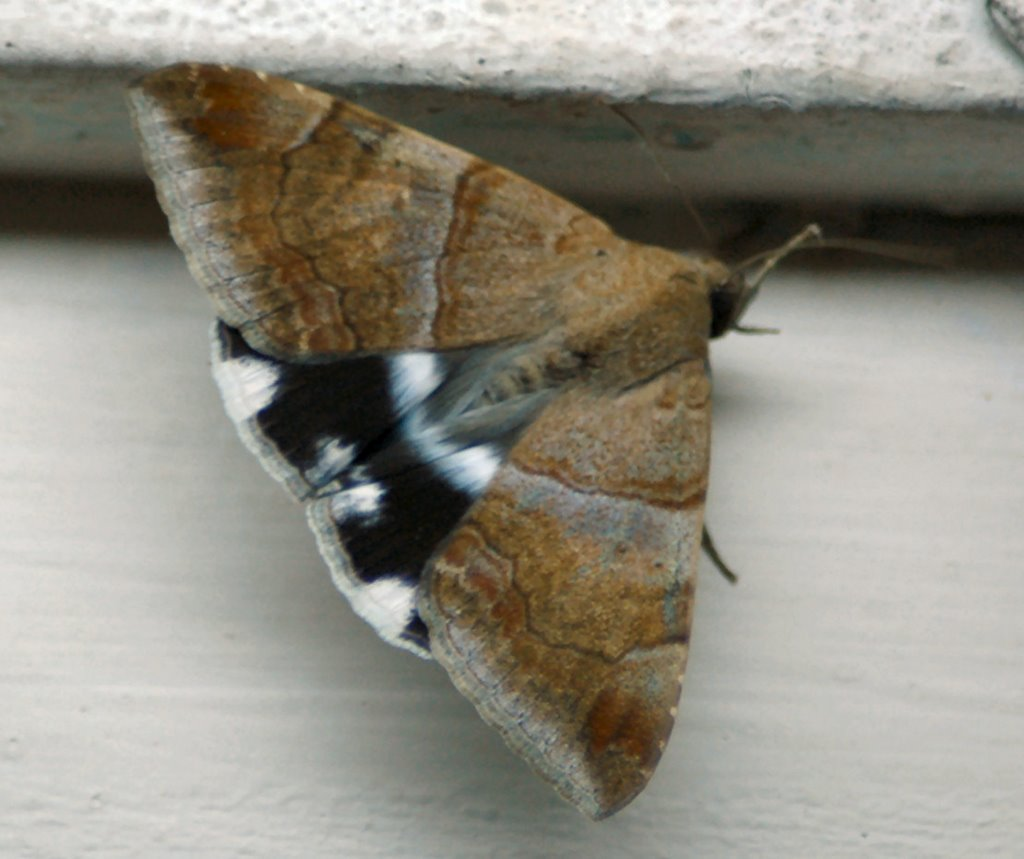

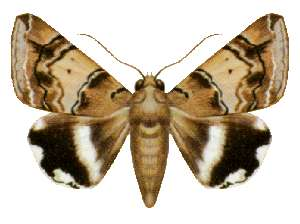

Scientific classification
- Kingdom: Animalia
- Phylum: Arthropoda
- Class: Insecta
- Order: Lepidoptera
- Superfamily: Noctuoidea
- Family: Erebidae
- Genus: Achaea
- Species: A. janata

Binomial name
- Achaea janata (Linnaeus, 1758)

Synonyms
- Geometra janata Linnaeus, 1758; Noctua melicerta Drury, 1770; Noctua tigrina Fabricius, 1781; Noctua cyathina Macleay, 1826; Catocala traversii Fereday, 1877; Ophiusa ekeikei Bethune-Baker, 1906; Achaea traversii (Fereday, 1877); Achaea tigrina (Fabricius, 1775); Achaea melicerta (Drury, 1773); Acanthodelta janata Linnaeus, 1758; Achaea ekeikei Bethune-Baker, 1906; Ophiusa melicerte Drury

= Achaea janata =

Castor semi-looper

Species of moth

Achaea janata, the castor semi-looper or croton caterpillar, is an erebid moth, the caterpillars of which are termed 'semi-loopers' due to their mode of locomotion. It is found from the Indo-Australian tropics and subtropics, extending south to New Zealand and east through the Pacific archipelagoes to Easter Island. It is a major pest of castor throughout the world.

== Description ==
Its wingspan is about 60–70 mm. The species has a pale reddish-brown body. Forewings with prominent markings. A short sub-basal waved line and an obliquely waved antemedial and excised postmedial lines are present. Postmedial lines are often black suffused inside them. A speck is found at the end of the cell. A diffuse rufous band runs beyond the postmedial line, Hindwings black with medial white band. Three large white spots can be seen on outer margin, with whitish cilia. Ventral side grey suffused. Forewings with an oblique white postmedial band not reaching the costa. Two crenulate medial lines found on each wing.

Eggs are small, spherical with a greenish color. Pupa is whitish green.

Larva bluish grey speckled with blue black. Head black striped. Lateral and sub-lateral yellowish bands with intervening blue-grey line. A dorsal black stripe bordered by reddish-white spots between fourth and fifth somites. There is a pair of dorsal red tubercles on anal somite. Spiracles and forelegs are red. Four larval instars are completed before pupal stage.

They feed on Excoecaria cochinchinensis (Euphorbiaceae), castor oil plant (Ricinus communis), both Brassica and Ficus species and many more crops like Arachis hypogaea, Citrus, Corchorus, Dalbergia sissoo, Dodonaea viscosa, Euphorbia hirta, Glycine max, Lagenaria siceraria, Punica granatum, Rosa chinensis, Solanum lycopersicum, Tamarindus indica, Theobroma cacao, Vigna mungo and Ziziphus mauritiana.

== Attack and control ==
As they feed off the castor oil plant they may be extremely poisonous and should be avoided at all costs. Caterpillars damage foliage, resulting in defoliation and reduction of photosynthesis process. They also attack stems and bore into them, and finally the whole plant wilts and dies.

Efforts to control the species are mainly mechanical, biological and chemical methods. Hand picking of late instars and usage of pheromone traps and light traps are effective in removing adults. Many parasitoids are used in biological control. Eggs can be destroyed using Trichogramma evanescens. Microplitis maculipennis is effective against caterpillars. Chalcid species Euplectrus and another a braconid, Rhogas are also used. In chemical control, quinalphos, chlorpyrifos, carbaryl, monocrotophos, endosulphan sprays are used. Neem seed kernel extract sprays are used to destroy eggs.

== Gallery ==
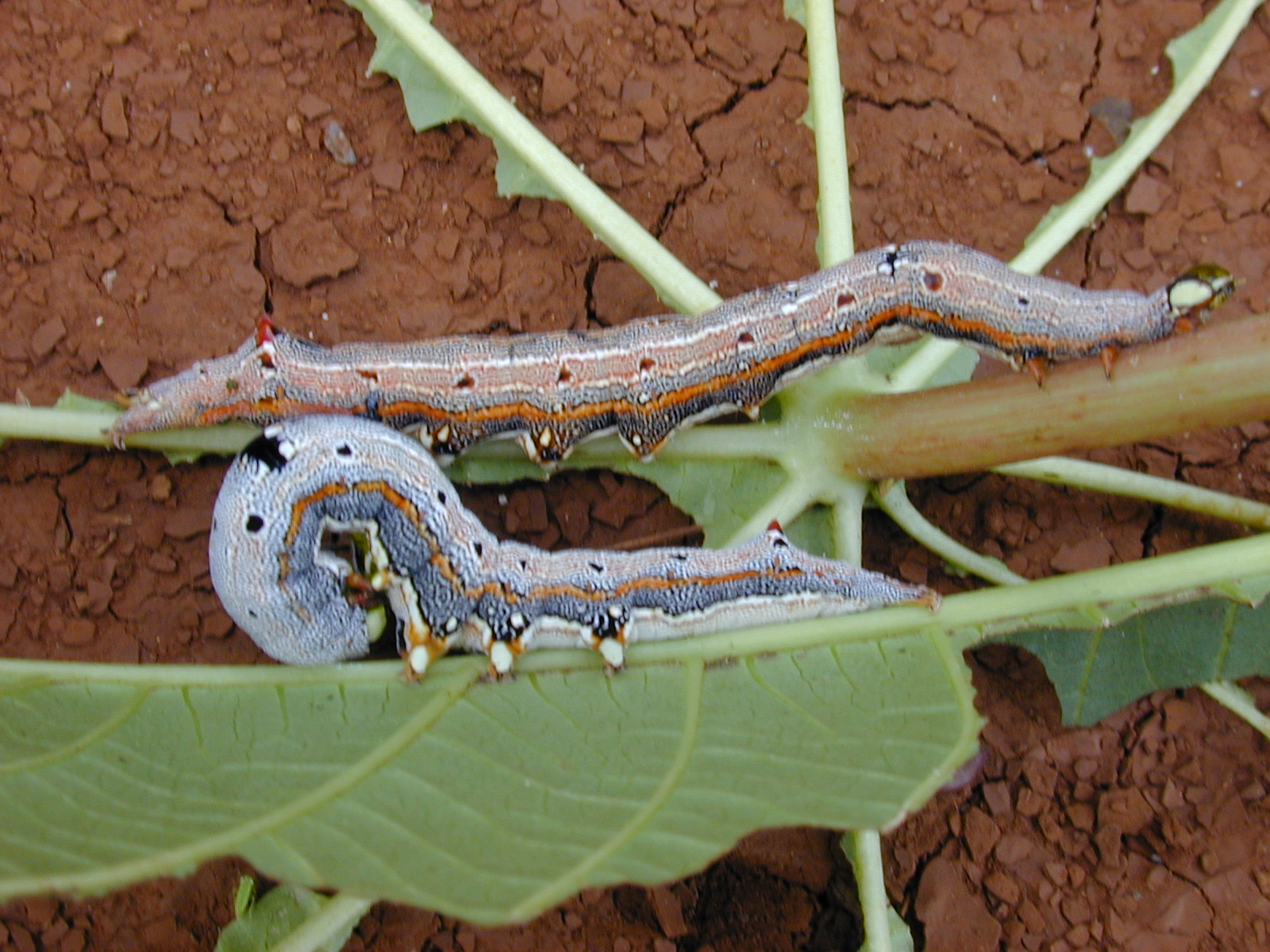
Caterpillars, lateral view

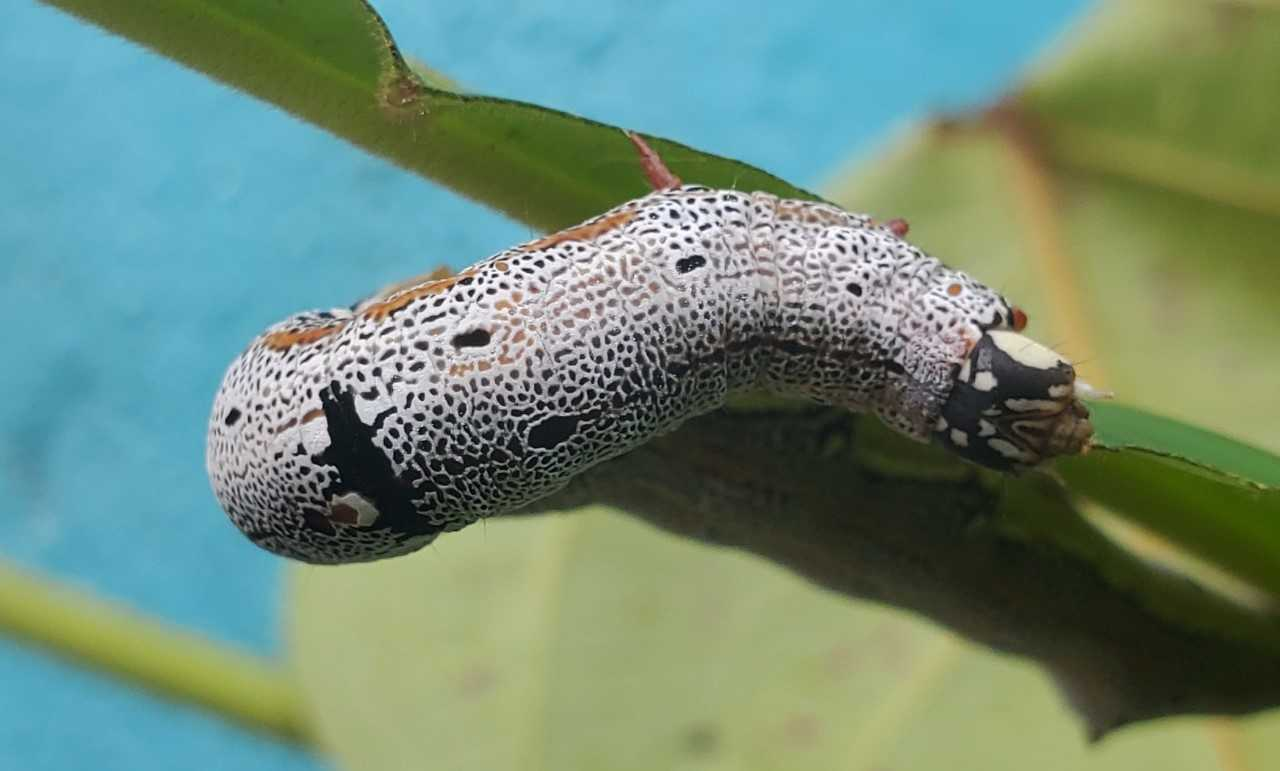
Caterpillar, head and dorsal view

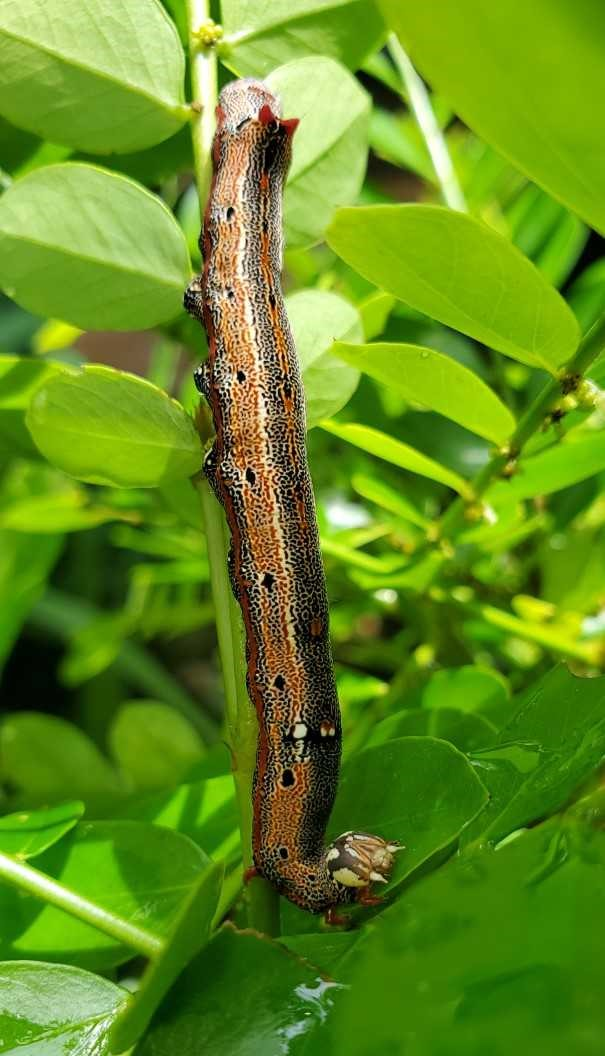
Caterpillar on Phyllanthus marianus, lateral view

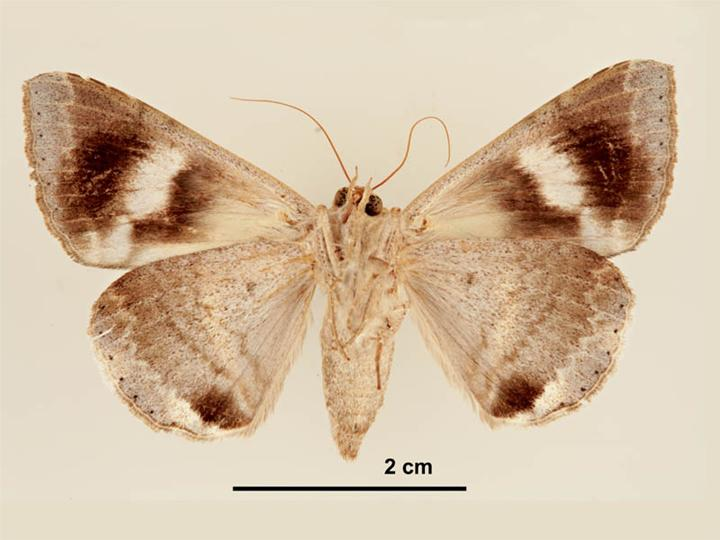
Male, ventral view

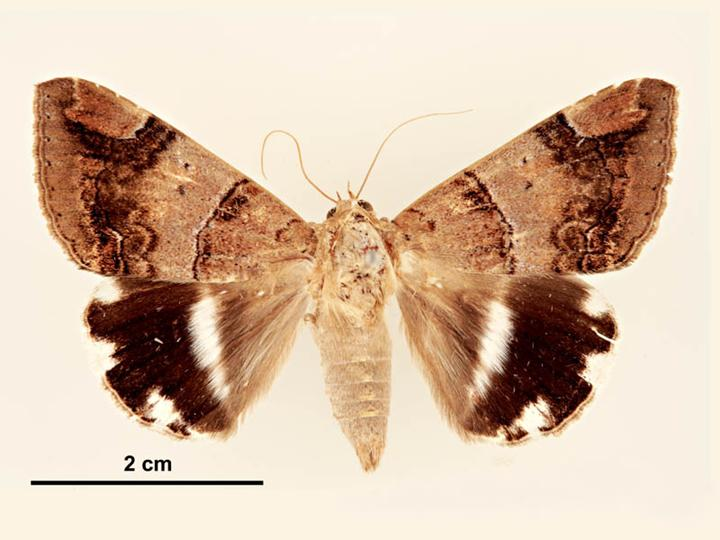
Male, dorsal view

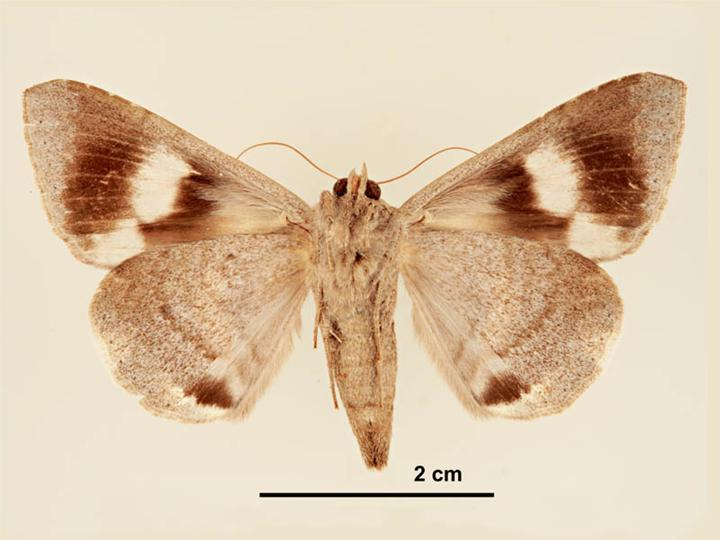
Female, ventral view

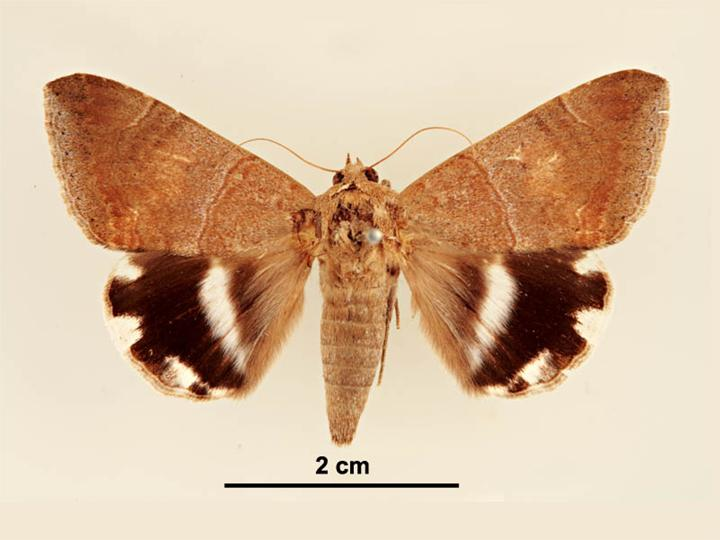
Female, dorsal view

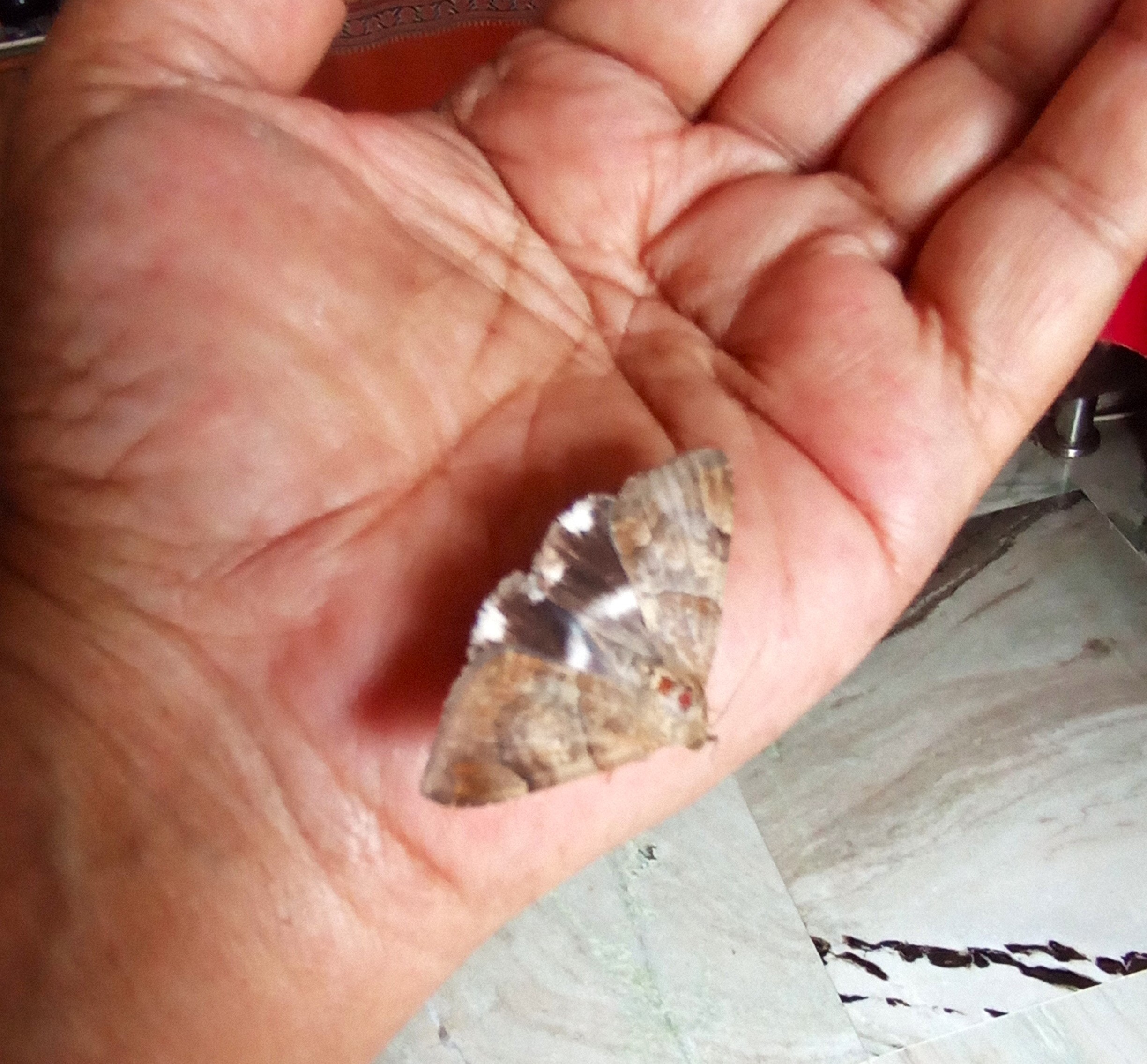
Castor semi-looper, Kolkata, West Bengal, India
