= Himalayan maple =

Himalayan maple is a common name for several species of maple tree native to the Himalaya region:

- Acer caesium
- Acer campbellii
- Acer oblongum
