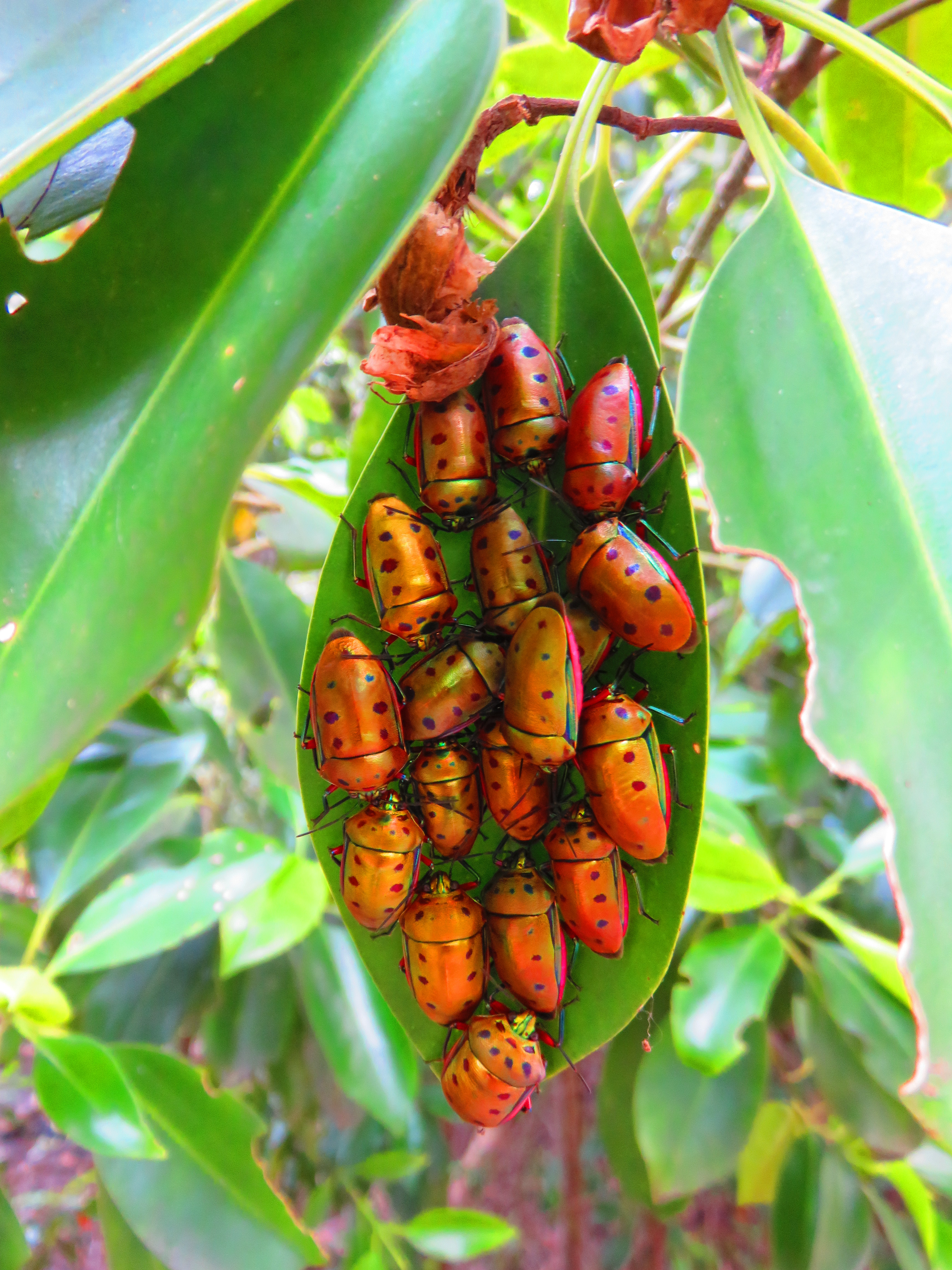
- An aggregation of C. nobilis at Sungei Buloh Wetland Reserve in Singapore

Scientific classification
- Kingdom: Animalia
- Phylum: Arthropoda
- Clade: Pancrustacea
- Class: Insecta
- Order: Hemiptera
- Suborder: Heteroptera
- Family: Scutelleridae
- Genus: Calliphara
- Species: C. nobilis

Binomial name
- Calliphara nobilis (Linnaeus, 1763)

Synonyms
- Callidea nobilis (Linnaeus, 1763); Calliphara buquetii (Guérin, 1838); Cimex nobilis (Linnaeus, 1763); Cimex pustulatus (Panzer, 1798); Scutellera buquetii (Guérin, 1838)

= Calliphara nobilis =

Species of jewel bug

Calliphara nobilis (commonly known as the mangrove jewel bug, mangrove shield bug, or mangrove stink bug) is a species of jewel bug found in Asia. Like all species of jewel bugs, it is phytophagous, feeding on the leaves, fruit and seeds of its host plants. This insect is notable for its multiple defense mechanisms: it is highly mobile and swarms disperse with a loud buzz when disturbed; it is aposematically colored, which serves as a warning to any would-be predators that it is unpalatable; and it possesses a robust chemical defense mechanism: it can secrete an irritating and toxic fluid from a pair of metathoracic scent glands when threatened.

== Taxonomy and evolutionary history ==
C. nobilis is one of 15 species within the genus Calliphara. The genus is part of the Scutelleridae (shield bug) family, which contains some 80 genera and 500 species worldwide. The scutellerids in turn are part of the larger Pentatomoidea superfamily, (which contains the shield bugs, giant shield bugs, burrower bugs, and stink bugs).

Time-divergence studies reveal that the scutellerids and other types of phytophagous insects first emerged in the Early Cretaceous (142.1–122.8 Ma), shortly after the emergence of the angiosperms. The diversification into the extant subfamilies of Scutelleridae occurred from the late Paleocene to the late Miocene, concomitantly with the rise of the major groups of angiosperms.

== Description ==
Like all species of jewel bugs, C. nobilis has a brilliant metallic coloration and a greatly enlarged scutellum which forms a continuous shield over the abdomen and wings. This latter characteristic distinguishes the jewel bugs from most other heteropterans, and may lead to their misidentification as a beetle rather than a bug. The pronotum and scutellum are mostly metallic orange with a greenish iridescence, each with seven black spots. Extreme variation in color — ranging from orange to blue-green — has been reported within a population.

The ostioles (openings of the external efferent system) of the metathoracic scent glands are large. The exocorium of the forewings is minimally exposed proximally, and the distal tip of the hemelytral membrane is just barely visible caudally. The head, tibiae and tarsi are iridescent green, and the femora are mostly orange. The antennae are a dark color with four segments, and the eyes are large. The ventral aspect of the abdominal sterna are dark, iridescent and punctate laterally, and lighter in the midline. The posterolateral angles of the sterna are smooth and without spines. Adults are 10–15 millimeters (0.4–0.6 in) long.

== Distribution and habitat ==
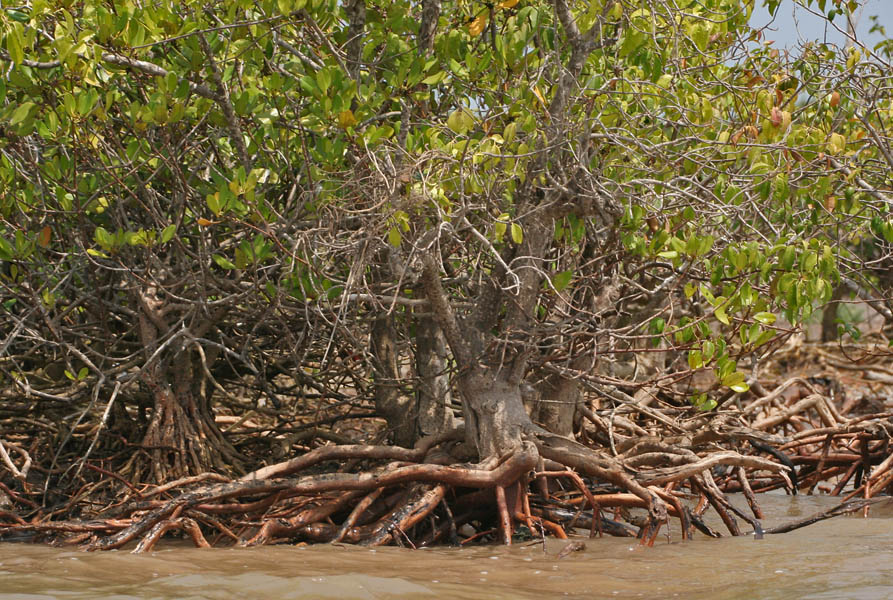
The river poison tree is the sole food plant of the larvae

The distribution of this species appears to be bounded on the west by Myanmar and on the east by the Philippines and the Maluku Islands. The northern limit of its distribution is Taiwan, while the southern limit is the Northern Territory of Australia.

Its habitat is coastal vegetation, specifically tropical mangrove forests growing in saline or brackish water. The plant hosts of this species include Acer oblongum, Casearia spp., Excoecaria agallocha, Gossypium hirsutum, Macaranga tanarius, Phyllanthus spp., Ricinus communis, Rhizophora spp., Santalum album, Xanthium strumarium.

== Behavior and ecology ==
While the adults of this gregarious species may be found in large numbers on the leaves of any of its host species, the eggs are deposited only on the leaves of Excoecaria agallocha (commonly known as the "river poison tree", "blind-your-eye mangrove", "milky mangrove", or "buta-buta tree"), as the nymphs feed only on the seeds of this plant.

Although it is phytophagous, C. nobilis is not considered to be a pest species because its host plants are not of significant economic importance. C. nobilis is not to be confused with Scutellera nobilis (also known as Scutellera perplexa). S. nobilis is a similar metallic shield bug that has been implicated as a minor pest on grape crops, as well as Jatropha curcas and Phyllanthus emblica crops in India.

=== Defense mechanisms ===
C. nobilis has several important defense mechanisms. They are highly mobile, and they disperse with a loud buzz when disturbed. They are aposematically colored, which serves as a warning to any would-be predators that they are unpalatable. C. nobilis, like all members of the Pentatomoidea superfamily of insects, also possesses a robust chemical defense mechanism in the form of a pair of metathoracic scent glands that can produce a foul-smelling liquid.

Many of the plants upon which these insects feed are known to contain a variety of phytotoxins. For example, the castor oil plant produces ricin, the rough cocklebur produces carboxyatractyloside, and the latex produced by the river poison tree contains excoecariatoxins, which are powerful irritants to skin, eyes and mucous membranes. Like many other species of aposematic scutellerids, C. nobilis is able to sequester chemical compounds such as these from its host plants that are toxic to their predators, and employ them in its own defenses. These chemical compounds are concentrated and stored in a pair of scent glands located on the metathorax of the adults and nymphs. When these insects are threatened or handled, they can secrete an irritating and toxic fluid from these glands as a deterrent to potential predators.
