= Excoecaria guineensis =

Scientific classification
- Kingdom: Plantae
- Clade: Tracheophytes
- Clade: Angiosperms
- Clade: Eudicots
- Clade: Rosids
- Order: Malpighiales
- Family: Euphorbiaceae
- Genus: Excoecaria
- Species: E. guineensis

Binomial name
- Excoecaria guineensis (Benth.) Müll.Arg.

Synonyms
- Stillingia guineensis Benth.; Sapium guineense (Benth.) Kuntze; Excoecaria angustifolia Afzel. ex Pax

Species of flowering plant

Excoecaria guineensis is a species of flowering plant in the family Euphorbiaceae. It was originally described as Stillingia guineensis Benth. in 1849. It is native to western and central tropical Africa.
