= Excoecaria borneensis =

Conservation status
- Near Threatened (IUCN 3.1)

Scientific classification
- Kingdom: Plantae
- Clade: Tracheophytes
- Clade: Angiosperms
- Clade: Eudicots
- Clade: Rosids
- Order: Malpighiales
- Family: Euphorbiaceae
- Genus: Excoecaria
- Species: E. borneensis

Binomial name
- Excoecaria borneensis Pax & K.Hoffm.

Synonyms
- Excoecaria mirandae Merr.

Species of flowering plant

Excoecaria borneensis is a species of flowering plant in the family Euphorbiaceae. It was described in 1914. It is native to Malesia.
