= Excoecaria bantamensis =

Scientific classification
- Kingdom: Plantae
- Clade: Tracheophytes
- Clade: Angiosperms
- Clade: Eudicots
- Clade: Rosids
- Order: Malpighiales
- Family: Euphorbiaceae
- Genus: Excoecaria
- Species: E. bantamensis

Binomial name
- Excoecaria bantamensis Müll.Arg.

Species of flowering plant

Excoecaria bantamensis is a species of flowering plant in the family Euphorbiaceae. It was described in 1863. It is native to southwest Thailand, Jawa, Borneo (in western Kalimantan), and the Philippines.
