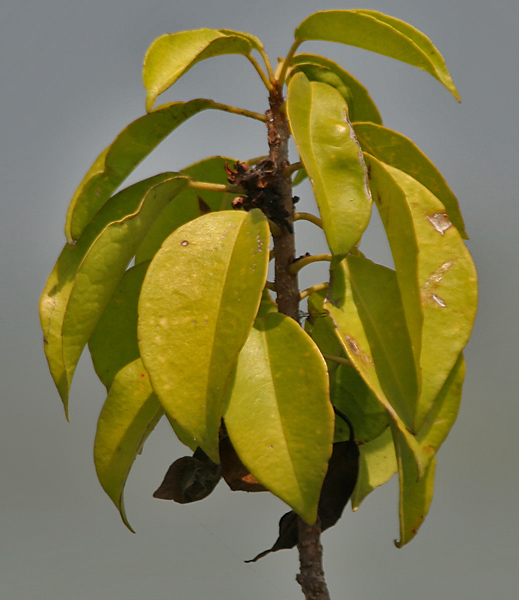
- Excoecaria agallocha in Krishna Wildlife Sanctuary, Andhra Pradesh, India

Scientific classification
- Kingdom: Plantae
- Clade: Tracheophytes
- Clade: Angiosperms
- Clade: Eudicots
- Clade: Rosids
- Order: Malpighiales
- Family: Euphorbiaceae
- Genus: Excoecaria
- Species: E. agallocha

Binomial name
- Excoecaria agallocha L.

= Excoecaria agallocha =

Species of plant

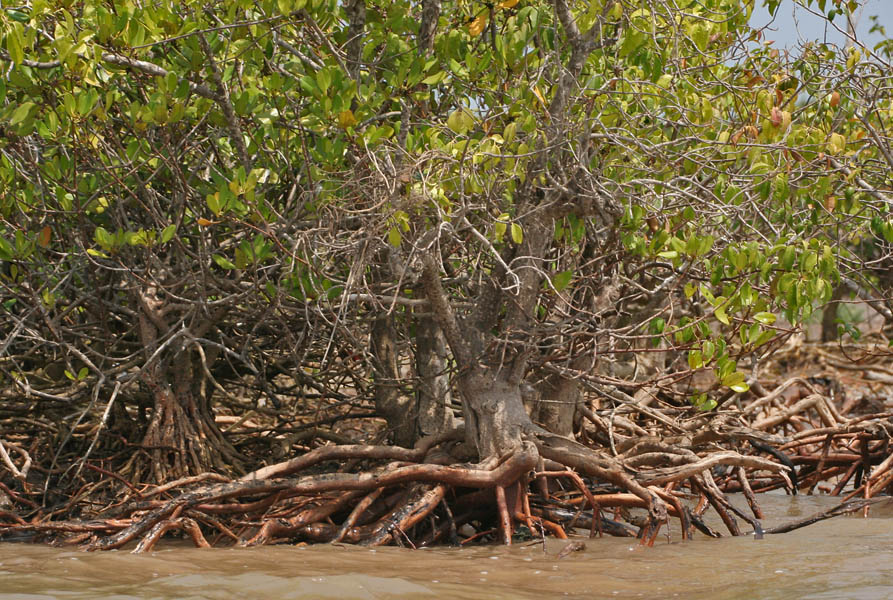
Growth habit of Excoecaria agallocha

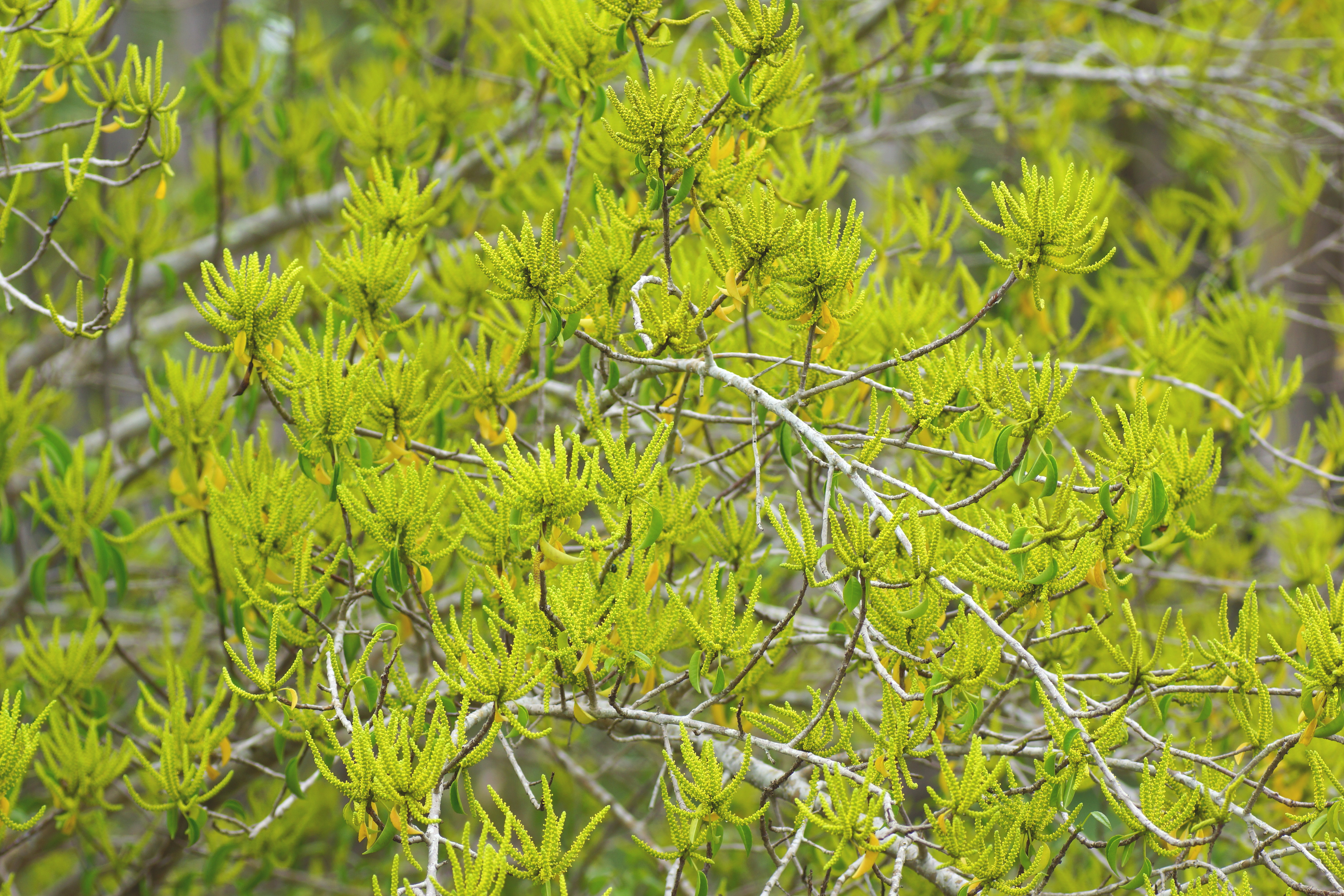
Excoecaria agallocha in flower

Excoecaria agallocha, a mangrove species, belongs to the genus Excoecaria of the family Euphorbiaceae. The species has many common names, including blind-your-eye mangrove, blinding tree, buta buta tree, milky mangrove, poisonfish tree, and river poison tree. Most of the names refer to its toxic properties or its propensity to cause blindness when its latex comes into contact with the eyes.

This plant grows in saline or brackish water in tropical mangrove forests, in a distribution bounded to the west by India, to the north by Bangladesh, to the south by Australia. Within Australia, it thrives from northern New South Wales along the northern coastline around to Western Australia. It can also be found along the coastlines of South China.

== Description ==
Mangrove swamps form a type of coastal wetland found in the tropics and subtropics. Within a mangrove forest, the most salt-tolerant species occur near the ocean. Excoecaria agallocha, known as a back mangrove, is found at higher elevations back away from the ocean where salinity is lower. Mangroves of this plant surround the ancient Thillai Chidambaram Temple in Tamil Nadu.

This small tree species may grow up to 15 m high. Trees are either male or female (dioecious). Male flowers form drooping tassels, while female flowers appear as shorter spikes. Pollinators such as bees commonly visit the flowers. The fruit is a small dark capsule.

The milky latex of Excoecaria agallocha is very poisonous and powerfully irritant, which is not unusual in milky species of plant in the family Euphorbiaceae. Contact with skin causes irritation and rapid blistering; slight contact with eyes can cause temporary blindness, hence the common names that refer to blindness. Even the generic name is from the Latin for "blinder".

William Bligh in his book Voyage to the South Sea mentioned that he was already aware of this hazard when he embarked on the voyage that ended in the notorious mutiny on the Bounty, having learned of it in 1777 from Captain James Cook during the time that he served as Cook's sailing master. Several of the men that Cook had sent ashore to cut wood had been blinded for a time. He accordingly instructed his men not to cut that type of tree when he sent them ashore in Nomuka (part of Tonga) to gather wood and water in 1789. It was just as well that he did so, because even the smoke from the burning wood is poisonous and can harm the eyes, so it would not have been useful as fuel.

== Taxonomy ==
Excoecaria agallocha, a mangrove species, belongs to the genus Excoecaria of the family Euphorbiaceae.

== Ecology ==
The latex produced by E. agallocha contains a variety of phorbol-like toxins such as excoecariatoxin which are powerful irritants to the skin, eyes and mucous membranes. Burning the wood can release toxic fumes in the smoke leading to eye irritation.

Despite the powerful chemical defense mechanisms of this plant, E. agallocha is the sole food source for the larvae of the mangrove jewel bug (Calliphara nobilis), a phytophagous species of jewel bug found in tropical mangrove forests in some parts of Asia. Like many other species of aposematic scutellerids, C. nobilis is able to sequester chemical compounds from its host plants that are toxic to their predators, and use them towards its own defenses. These chemical compounds are concentrated and stored in a pair of scent glands located on the metathorax of the adults and nymphs. When these insects are threatened or handled, they can secrete an irritating and toxic fluid from these glands as a deterrent to potential predators.

== Uses ==
Even dried and powdered leaves retain the poison and can kill fish quickly or be used on a poison dart.
