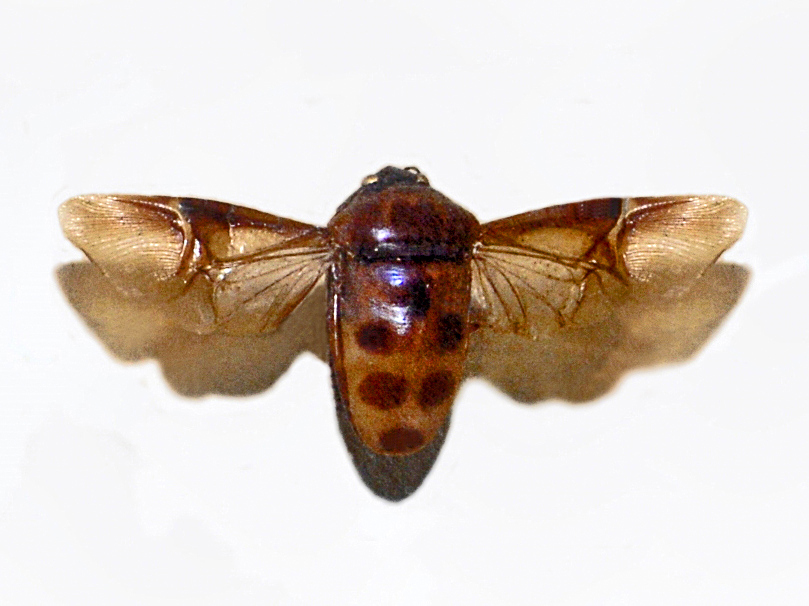
- Calliphara regalis from New Guinea. Museum specimen

Scientific classification
- Domain: Eukaryota
- Kingdom: Animalia
- Phylum: Arthropoda
- Class: Insecta
- Order: Hemiptera
- Suborder: Heteroptera
- Family: Scutelleridae
- Genus: Calliphara
- Species: C. regalis

Binomial name
- Calliphara regalis (Fabricius, 1775)

Synonyms
- Calliphara eximia Vollenhoven, 1873; Callidea eximia Vollenhoven, 1863; Callidea biplaga Walker, 1867; Callidea erythrospila Walker, 1867; Callidea semirufa Walker, 1867; Tetrarthria sobria Walker, 1867; Cimex regalis Fabricius, 1775

= Calliphara regalis =

Species of true bug

Calliphara regalis is a species of insect in the family Scutelleridae (Hemiptera).

== Description ==
The basic body color is deep green with metallic reflections. The pattern may vary considerably, but usually these insects show dorsally five or seven large spots, more or less fused.

== Distribution ==
This species can be found in Australia and Indonesia.
