= Excoecaria formosana =

Scientific classification
- Kingdom: Plantae
- Clade: Tracheophytes
- Clade: Angiosperms
- Clade: Eudicots
- Clade: Rosids
- Order: Malpighiales
- Family: Euphorbiaceae
- Genus: Excoecaria
- Species: E. formosana

Binomial name
- Excoecaria formosana (Hayata) Hayata & Kawak.

Species of flowering plant

Excoecaria formosana is a species of flowering plant in the family Euphorbiaceae. It was originally described as Excoecaria crenulata var. formosana Hayata. It is native to Nansei-shoto, Japan and Taiwan.
