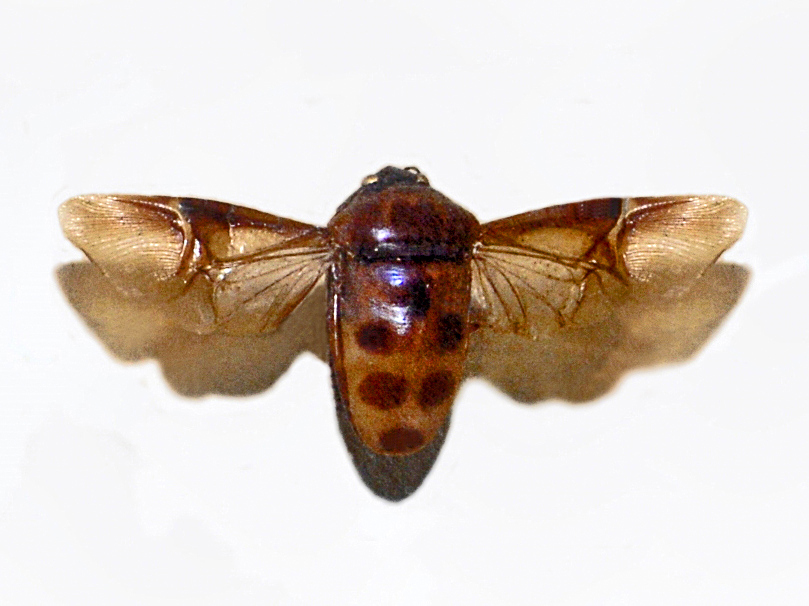
- Calliphara regalis

Scientific classification
- Kingdom: Animalia
- Phylum: Arthropoda
- Class: Insecta
- Order: Hemiptera
- Suborder: Heteroptera
- Family: Scutelleridae
- Tribe: Scutellerini
- Genus: Calliphara; Germar, 1839

Synonyms
- Chrysophara Stål, 1873; Lamprophara Stål, 1865; Philia Schiødte, 1843; Schioedtea Kirkaldy, 1905

= Calliphara =

Genus of true bugs

Calliphara is a genus of jewel bugs in the family Scutelleridae (Hemiptera).

This genus has a wide distribution extending to China, Philippines, Queensland and New Guinea.

== Species ==
BioLib includes:

- Calliphara bifasciata (White, 1842)
- Calliphara billardierii (Fabricius, 1803)
- Calliphara bipunctata Lehemann, 1920
- Calliphara caesar (Vollenhoven, 1863)
- Calliphara dimidiata (Dallas, 1851)
- Calliphara excellens (Burmeister, 1834)
- Calliphara imperialis (Fabricius, 1775)
- Calliphara lanceolata Distant, 1903
- Calliphara munda Stål, 1866
- Calliphara nobilis (Linnaeus, 1763)
- Calliphara placida Breddin, 1905
- Calliphara praslinia (Guérin-Méneville, 1838)
- Calliphara regalis (Fabricius, 1775)
- Calliphara regia (Westwood, 1837)
- Calliphara solomonensis Lyal, 1979
- Calliphara vollenhoveni Lyal, 1979
