= Excoecaria benthamiana =

Conservation status
- Vulnerable (IUCN 3.1)

Scientific classification
- Kingdom: Plantae
- Clade: Tracheophytes
- Clade: Angiosperms
- Clade: Eudicots
- Clade: Rosids
- Order: Malpighiales
- Family: Euphorbiaceae
- Genus: Excoecaria
- Species: E. benthamiana

Binomial name
- Excoecaria benthamiana Hemsl.

Synonyms
- Excoecaria densiflora (Baker) Pax; Stillingia lineata var. densiflora Baker

Species of flowering plant

Excoecaria benthamiana is a species of flowering plant in the family Euphorbiaceae. It is endemic to Seychelles. The plant grows to 5 meters tall. All parts of the plant contain milky sap, the latex being a powerful vesicant used to treat warts.

Excoecaria b. is mainly threatened by its restricted range. However, the invasion of alien species, such as Cinnamomum verum and Alstonia macrophylla, may become a threat for the rejuvenation of this species in the future.
