= Excoecaria goudotiana =

Scientific classification
- Kingdom: Plantae
- Clade: Tracheophytes
- Clade: Angiosperms
- Clade: Eudicots
- Clade: Rosids
- Order: Malpighiales
- Family: Euphorbiaceae
- Genus: Excoecaria
- Species: E. goudotiana

Binomial name
- Excoecaria goudotiana (Baill.) Müll.Arg.

Synonyms
- Stillingia goudotiana Baill.; Sapium goudotianum (Baill.) Pax; Taeniosapium goudotianum (Baill.) Müll.Arg.

Species of flowering plant

Excoecaria goudotiana is a species of flowering plant in the family Euphorbiaceae. It was originally described as Stillingia goudotiana Baill. in 1861. It is native to Madagascar.
