= Excoecaria canjoerensis =

Scientific classification
- Kingdom: Plantae
- Clade: Tracheophytes
- Clade: Angiosperms
- Clade: Eudicots
- Clade: Rosids
- Order: Malpighiales
- Family: Euphorbiaceae
- Genus: Excoecaria
- Species: E. canjoerensis

Binomial name
- Excoecaria canjoerensis Dennst.

Species of flowering plant

Excoecaria canjoerensis is a species of flowering plant in the spurge family, Euphorbiaceae. It was described in 1818. It is native to India.
