= Hippomane horrida =

Scientific classification
- Kingdom: Plantae
- Clade: Tracheophytes
- Clade: Angiosperms
- Clade: Eudicots
- Clade: Rosids
- Order: Malpighiales
- Family: Euphorbiaceae
- Genus: Hippomane
- Species: H. horrida

Binomial name
- Hippomane horrida Urb. & Ekman

Species of flowering plant

Hippomane horrida is a plant species in the Euphorbiaceae first described for science in 1929. It is endemic to Barahona Province in the Dominican Republic in the West Indies.
