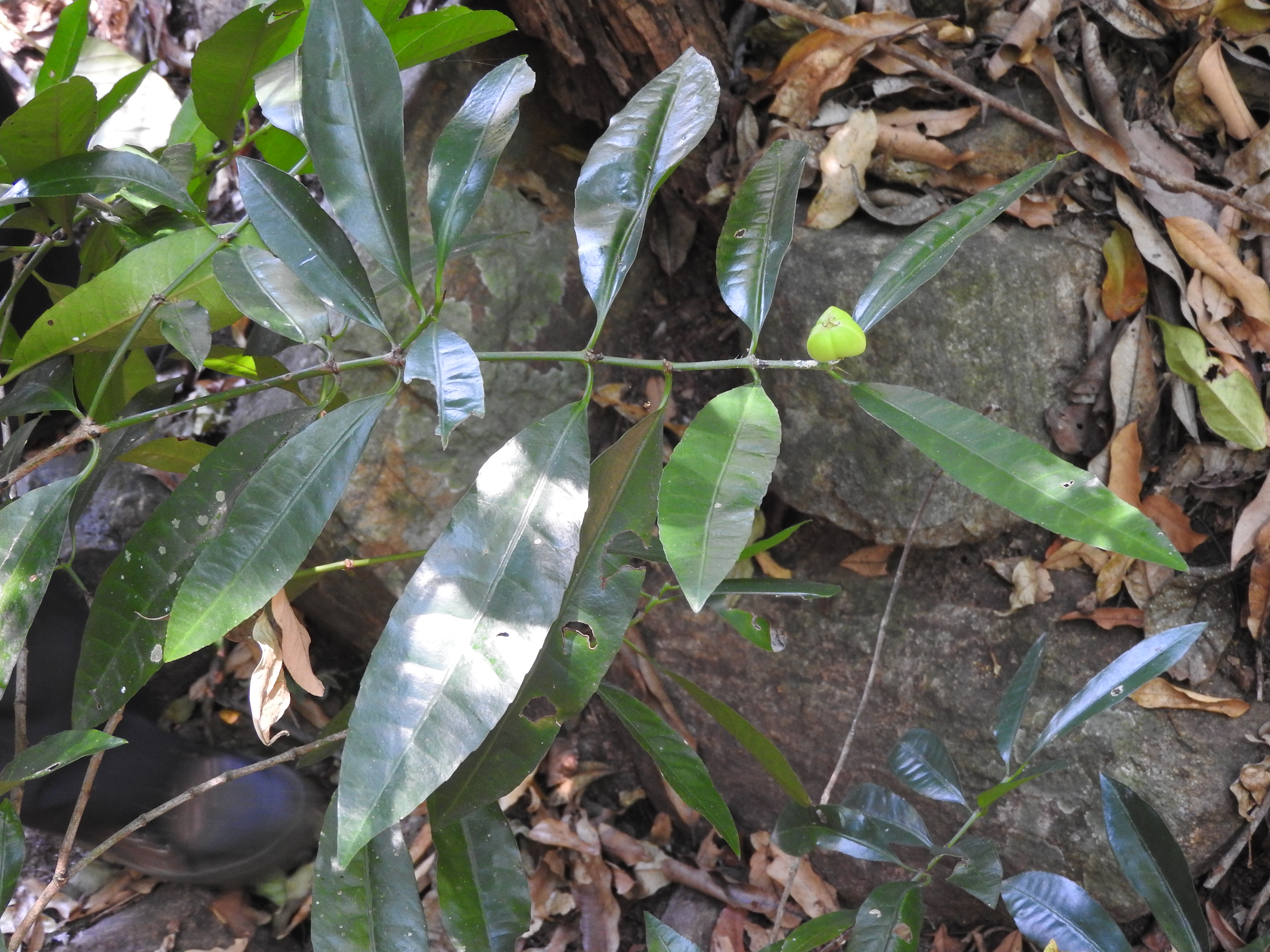

Scientific classification
- Kingdom: Plantae
- Clade: Tracheophytes
- Clade: Angiosperms
- Clade: Eudicots
- Clade: Rosids
- Order: Malpighiales
- Family: Euphorbiaceae
- Genus: Excoecaria
- Species: E. oppositifolia

Binomial name
- Excoecaria oppositifolia Griff.

Synonyms
- Excoecaria aboriana A.B.De; Excoecaria oppositifolia var. oppositifolia

= Excoecaria oppositifolia =

Species of flowering plant

Excoecaria oppositifolia, an understory and evergreen tree species, belongs to the genus Excoecaria of the family Euphorbiaceae. It is found in the Western Ghats of India and Sri Lanka. Trees are 5 metres (16 ft) tall and leaves are simple and decussate in nature. Unisexual flowers are dioecious and inflorescence depends on the type of flower. Male flowers are axillary spikes and female flowers are axillary racemes.
