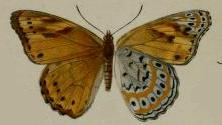

Scientific classification
- Kingdom: Animalia
- Phylum: Arthropoda
- Class: Insecta
- Order: Lepidoptera
- Family: Nymphalidae
- Genus: Sevenia
- Species: S. natalensis

Binomial name
- Sevenia natalensis (Boisduval, 1847)

Synonyms
- Crenis natalensis Boisduval, 1847; Asterope natalensis; Sallya natalensis; Crenis wallengreni Staudinger, 1886; Sallya natalensis f. melania van Son, 1979

= Sevenia natalensis =

Natal tree nymph

Species of butterfly

Sevenia natalensis, the Natal tree nymph, is a butterfly in the family Nymphalidae found in southeastern Africa.

Wingspan: 40–48 mm.

Flight period year round, peaking between February and May.

Larvae feed of Sapium reticulatum and Sapium integerrimum.
