= Excoecaria grahamii =

Scientific classification
- Kingdom: Plantae
- Clade: Tracheophytes
- Clade: Angiosperms
- Clade: Eudicots
- Clade: Rosids
- Order: Malpighiales
- Family: Euphorbiaceae
- Genus: Excoecaria
- Species: E. grahamii

Binomial name
- Excoecaria grahamii Stapf

Species of flowering plant

Excoecaria grahamii is a species of flowering plant in the family Euphorbiaceae. It was described in 1906. It is native to western tropical Africa.
