= Excoecaria bussei =

Scientific classification
- Kingdom: Plantae
- Clade: Tracheophytes
- Clade: Angiosperms
- Clade: Eudicots
- Clade: Rosids
- Order: Malpighiales
- Family: Euphorbiaceae
- Genus: Excoecaria
- Species: E. bussei

Binomial name
- Excoecaria bussei (Pax) Pax

Species of flowering plant

Excoecaria bussei is a species of flowering plant in the family Euphorbiaceae. It was originally described as Sapium bussei Pax in 1903. It is native from Kenya to the Caprivi Strip.
