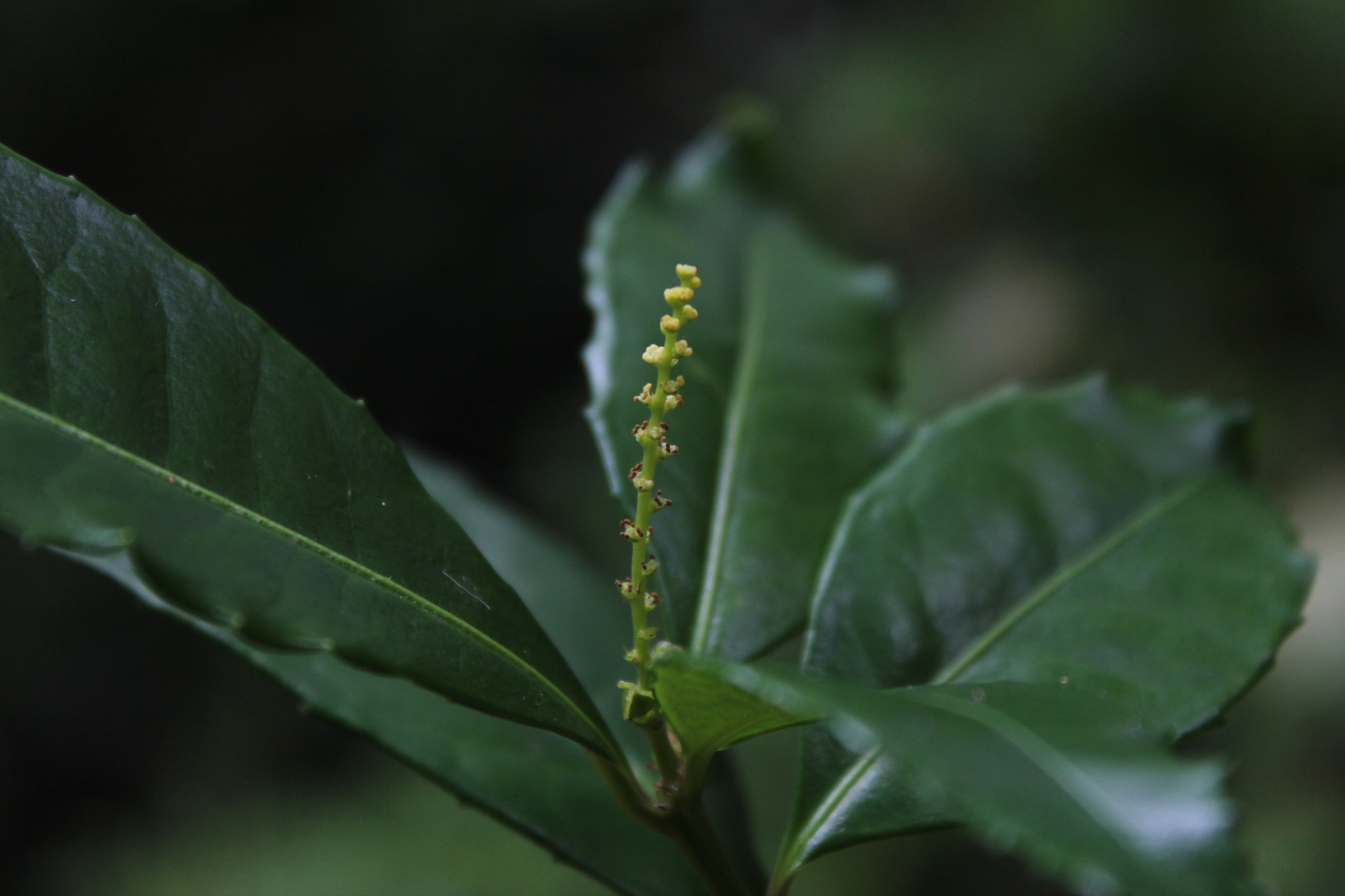

Scientific classification
- Kingdom: Plantae
- Clade: Tracheophytes
- Clade: Angiosperms
- Clade: Eudicots
- Clade: Rosids
- Order: Malpighiales
- Family: Euphorbiaceae
- Genus: Excoecaria
- Species: E. simii

Binomial name
- Excoecaria simii (Kuntze) Pax

Synonyms
- Excoecaria caffra Sim; Sapium simii Kuntze

= Excoecaria simii =

Species of flowering plant

Excoecaria simii, the forest pepper-seed or forest pepper-seed bush, is a species of flowering plant in the family Euphorbiaceae. It is endemic to South Africa, in forests of KwaZulu-Natal and Eastern Cape.

The forest pepper-seed bush is a small tree or shrub with slender branches. Its shiny green leaves have serrated margins and paler leaf undersides. The flowers are formed in spikes up to 25 mm (0.98 in) in length. It is considered a species of least concern on the South African National Biodiversity Institute's Red List of South African Plants.

It was originally described as Sapium simii Kuntze in 1898.

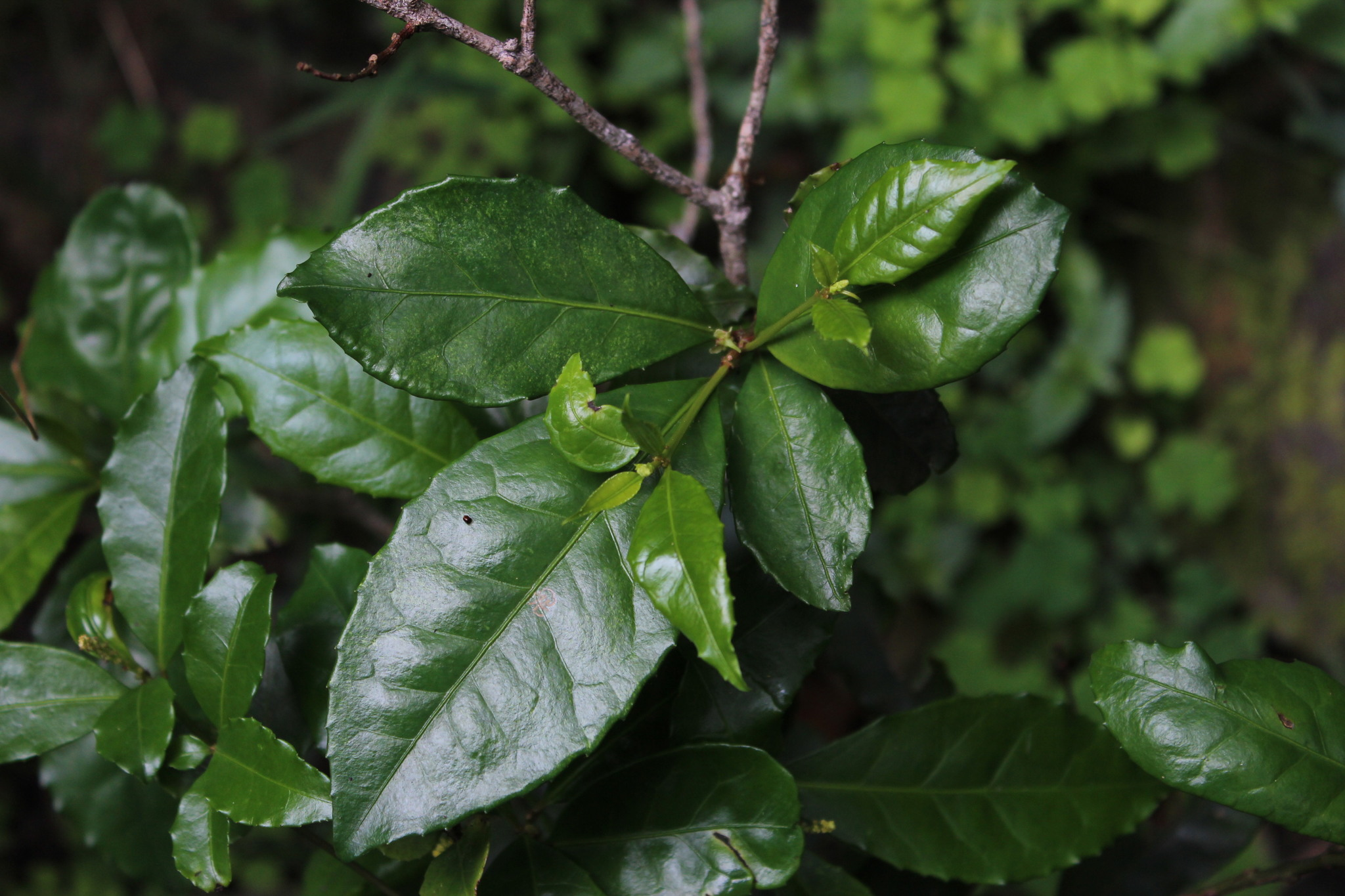
Leaves
