= Excoecaria aporusifolia =

Scientific classification
- Kingdom: Plantae
- Clade: Tracheophytes
- Clade: Angiosperms
- Clade: Eudicots
- Clade: Rosids
- Order: Malpighiales
- Family: Euphorbiaceae
- Genus: Excoecaria
- Species: E. aporusifolia

Binomial name
- Excoecaria aporusifolia P.T.Li

Species of plant

Excoecaria aporusifolia is a species of flowering plant in the family Euphorbiaceae. It was described in 1984. It is native to Vietnam.
