= Excoecaria cuspidata =

Scientific classification
- Kingdom: Plantae
- Clade: Tracheophytes
- Clade: Angiosperms
- Clade: Eudicots
- Clade: Rosids
- Order: Malpighiales
- Family: Euphorbiaceae
- Genus: Excoecaria
- Species: E. cuspidata

Binomial name
- Excoecaria cuspidata (Müll.Arg.) Chakrab. & M.Gangop.

Species of flowering plant

Excoecaria cuspidata is a species of flowering plant in the family Euphorbiaceae. It was originally described as Excoecaria hialayensis var. cuspidata Müll.Arg. It is native to China and Meghalaya, India.
