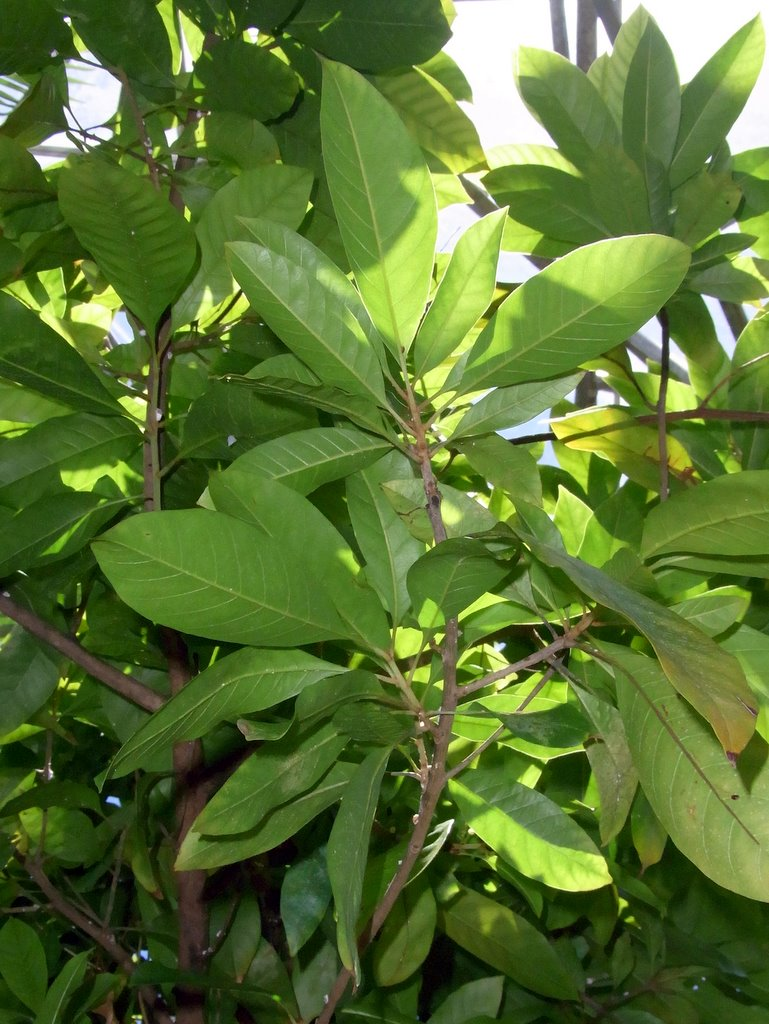

Scientific classification
- Kingdom: Plantae
- Clade: Tracheophytes
- Clade: Angiosperms
- Clade: Eudicots
- Clade: Rosids
- Order: Malpighiales
- Family: Euphorbiaceae
- Genus: Excoecaria
- Species: E. dallachyana

Binomial name
- Excoecaria dallachyana (Baill.) Benth.

Synonyms
- Excoecaria agallocha var. dallachiana Baill.

= Excoecaria dallachyana =

Species of tree

Excoecaria dallachyana, the scrub poison tree or brush poison tree, is a species of plant in the spurge family, Euphorbiaceae. It is found from the Clarence River, New South Wales to Townsville, Queensland in Australia. The habitat is rainforest by streams or in the drier form of rainforest. The leaves are toxic to livestock and the sap is irritating to human skin. It is a slender tree which may reach 15 m (49 ft) in height.
