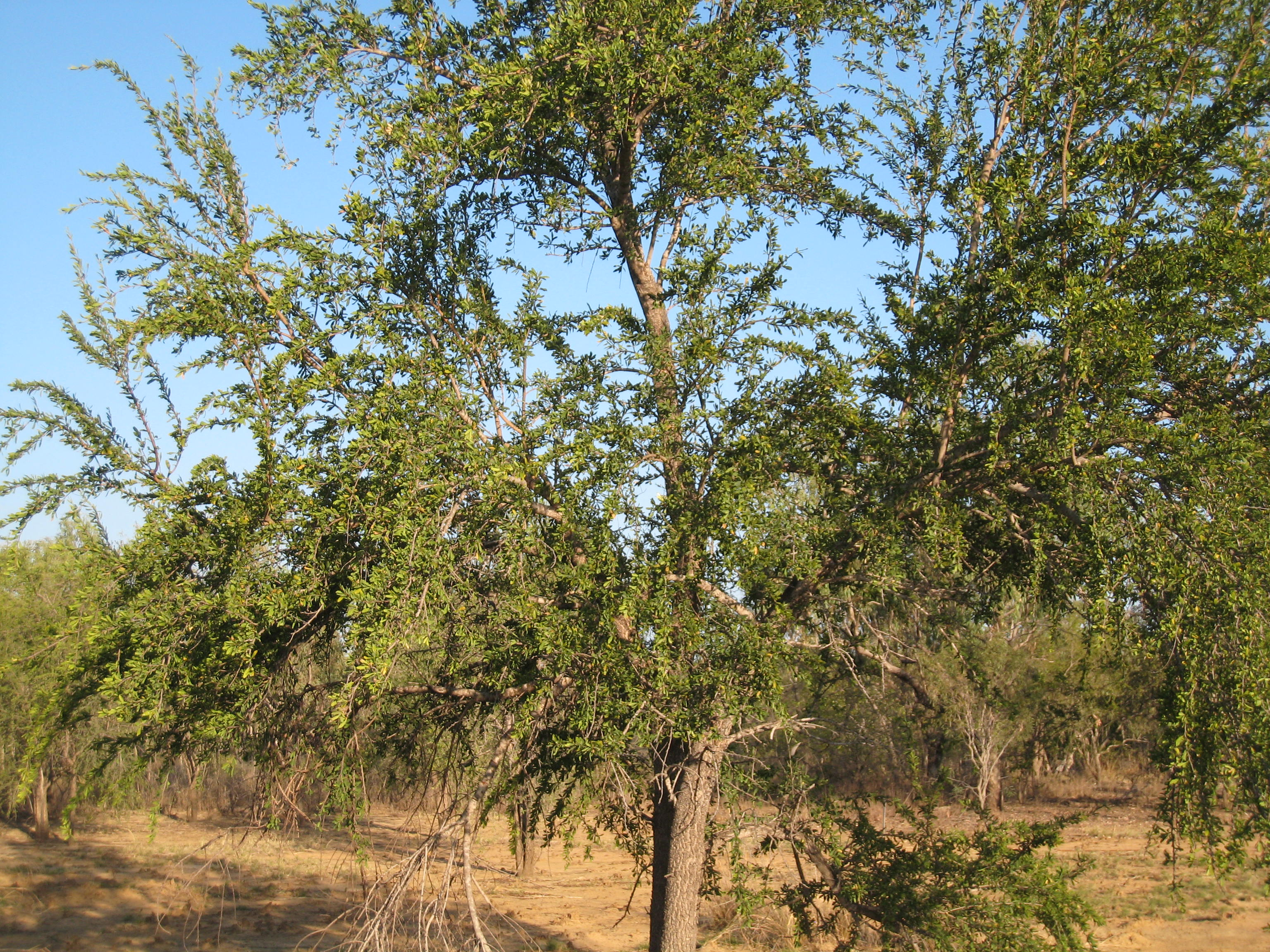
- in Bradshaw Field Training Area

Scientific classification
- Kingdom: Plantae
- Clade: Embryophytes
- Clade: Tracheophytes
- Clade: Spermatophytes
- Clade: Angiosperms
- Clade: Eudicots
- Clade: Rosids
- Order: Malpighiales
- Family: Euphorbiaceae
- Genus: Excoecaria
- Species: E. parvifolia

Binomial name
- Excoecaria parvifolia Müll.Arg.

Synonyms
- Excoecaria agallocha var. muelleriana Baill.

= Excoecaria parvifolia =

Species of plant

Excoecaria parvifolia is a plant in the Euphorbiaceae family, native to Western Australia, the Northern Territory, and Queensland It is also known as the guttapercha tree, although it is botanically unrelated to the Southeast Asian gutta-percha (Palaquium gutta).

It was first described by Johannes Müller Argoviensis in 1864, from a specimen collected by Ferdinand von Mueller in Arnhem Land.

It is found across northern Australia, from northern Western Australia, the north of the Northern Territory, to northern Queensland, growing on seasonally waterlogged clay flats, and occasionally on semi-saline soils.

It flowers in the early wet season with fruits appearing from January to April.

== Indigenous names and uses ==
The Warumungu people of the Tennant Creek area know this tree as Manyingiila, and use the smoke from burning the wood to keep away mosquitoes.

Other Aboriginal language names are: Gurniny (Jaminjung, Ngaliwurru, Nungali), Yilili (MalakMalak, Matngala), Gilirr (Mangarrayi, Yangman).
