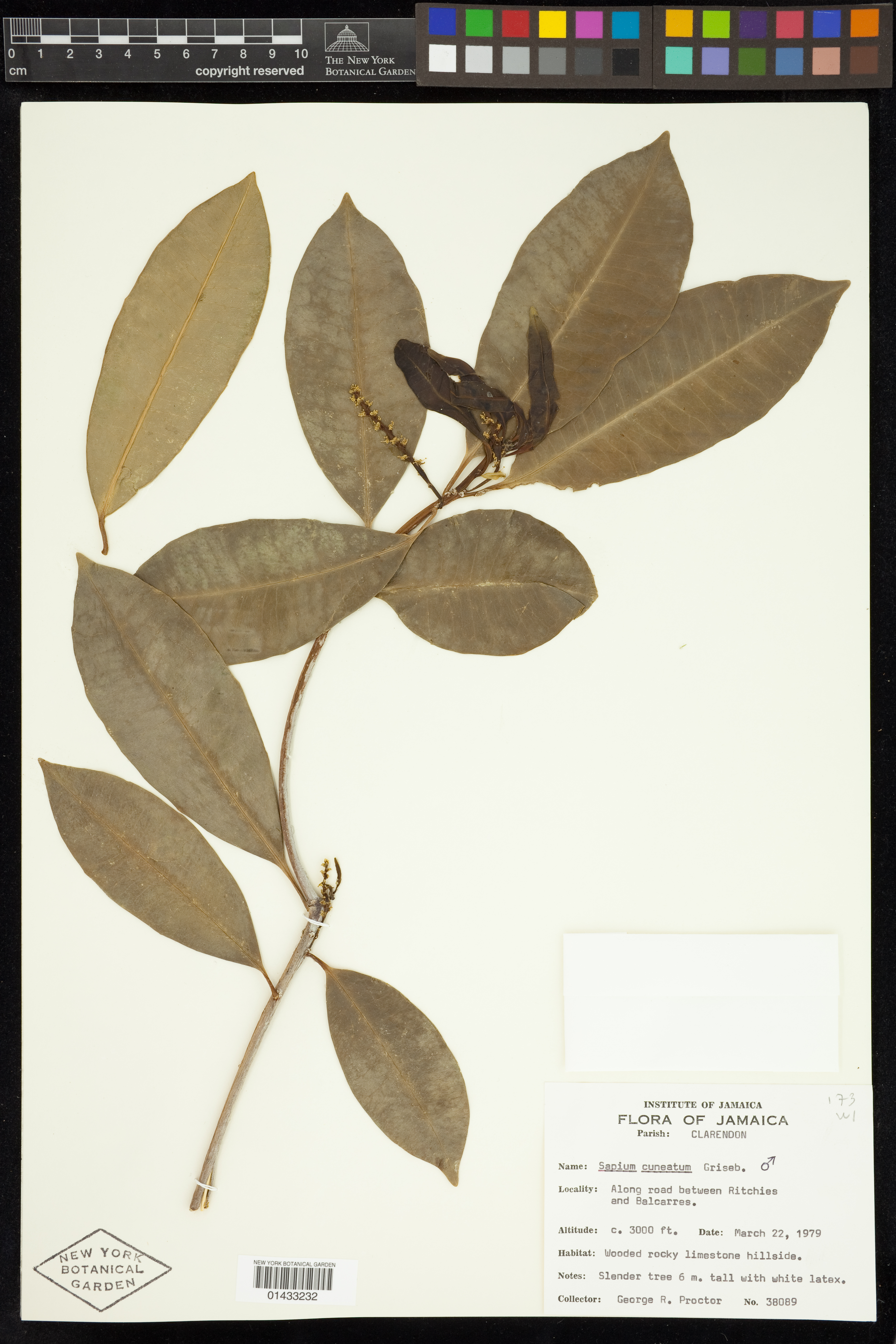

Scientific classification
- Kingdom: Plantae
- Clade: Tracheophytes
- Clade: Angiosperms
- Clade: Eudicots
- Clade: Rosids
- Order: Malpighiales
- Family: Euphorbiaceae
- Genus: Sapium
- Species: S. cuneatum

Binomial name
- Sapium cuneatum Griseb.

Synonyms
- Excoecaria cuneata (Griseb.) Müll.Arg.; Sapium harrisii Urb. ex Pax

= Sapium cuneatum =

Species of flowering plant

Sapium cuneatum is a species of flowering plant in the family Euphorbiaceae. It is endemic to Jamaica.
