= Shirakiopsis indica =

Conservation status
- Least Concern (IUCN 3.1)

Scientific classification
- Kingdom: Plantae
- Clade: Tracheophytes
- Clade: Angiosperms
- Clade: Eudicots
- Clade: Rosids
- Order: Malpighiales
- Family: Euphorbiaceae
- Genus: Shirakiopsis
- Species: S. indica

Binomial name
- Shirakiopsis indica (Willd.) Esser

Synonyms
- Excoecaria diversifolia (Miq.) Müll.Arg.; Excoecaria indica (Willd.) Müll.Arg.; Sapium bingerium Roxb. ex Willd.; Sapium diversifolium (Miq.) Pax; Sapium hurmais Buch.-Ham.; Sapium indicum Willd.; Shirakia indica (Willd.) Hurus.; Stillingia diversifolia Miq.; Stillingia indica (Willd.) Oken

Species of mangrove

Shirakiopsis indica is a mangrove species in the family Euphorbiaceae. Its fruits and seeds are very poisonous and are used as a fish poison. A decoction of the root bark possesses purgative and emetic properties and is said to be used in insanity and hydrophobia.
