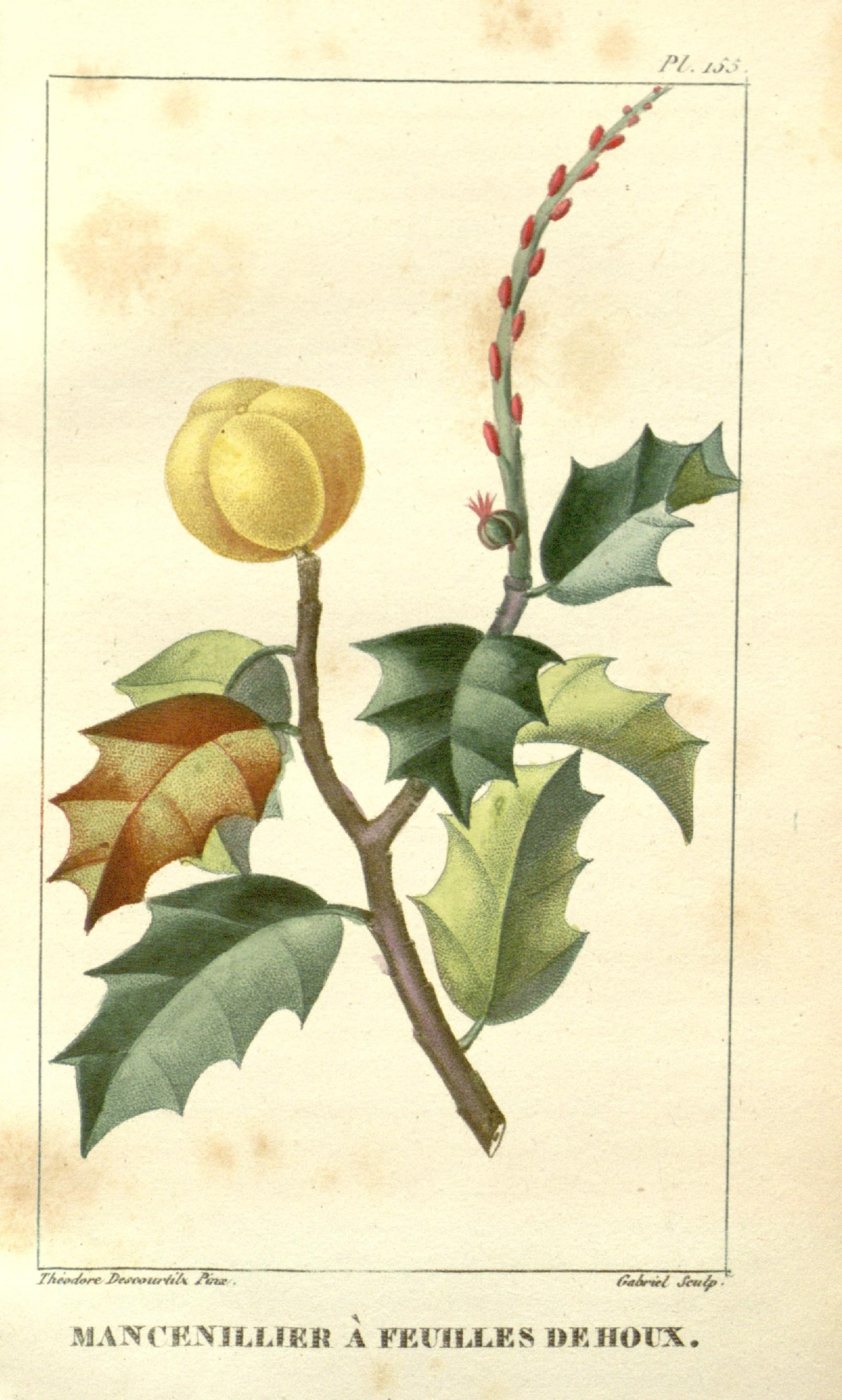

Conservation status
- Least Concern (IUCN 3.1)

Scientific classification
- Kingdom: Plantae
- Clade: Tracheophytes
- Clade: Angiosperms
- Clade: Eudicots
- Clade: Rosids
- Order: Malpighiales
- Family: Euphorbiaceae
- Genus: Hippomane
- Species: H. spinosa

Binomial name
- Hippomane spinosa L.

Synonyms
- Sapium ilicifolium Willd.

= Hippomane spinosa =

Species of flowering plant

Hippomane spinosa is a plant species in the family Euphorbiaceae.

It was described by Linnaeus in 1753. In Haitian Creole, the plant is known as pomme zombi ('zombie apple'), and in Dominican Spanish, it is known as manzanillo ('chamomile'). Like the related manchineel (H. mancinella), its toxicity makes it resistant to deforestation by locals.

== Distribution and habitat ==
The plant is endemic to the island of Hispaniola in the Caribbean (in the Dominican Republic and Haiti). It is found in the Hispaniolan dry forests ecoregion.

== See also ==
- Flora of Hispaniola
