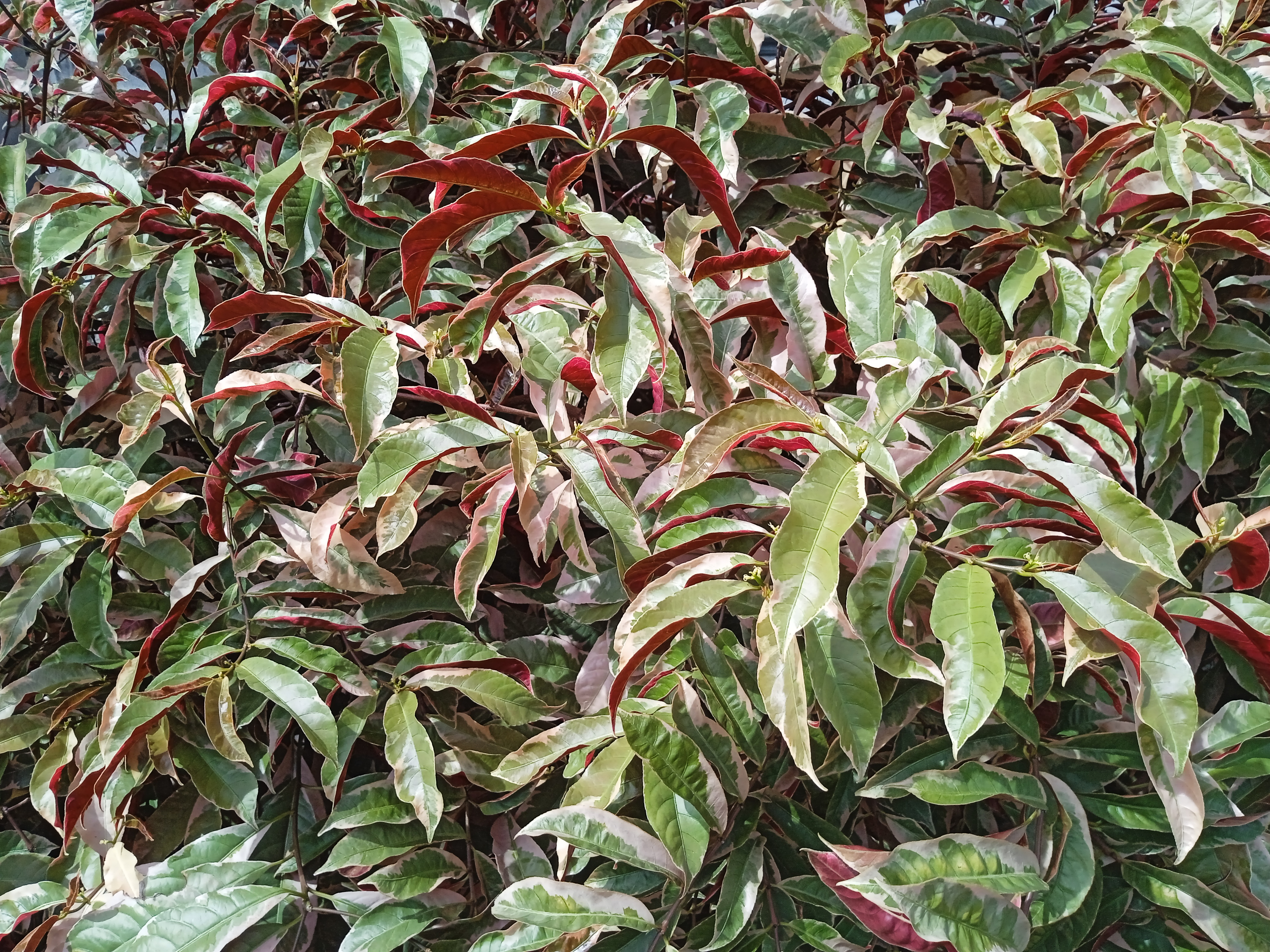
- Excoecaria cochinchinensis "Firestorm"

Conservation status
- Least Concern (IUCN 3.1)

Scientific classification
- Kingdom: Plantae
- Clade: Tracheophytes
- Clade: Angiosperms
- Clade: Eudicots
- Clade: Rosids
- Order: Malpighiales
- Family: Euphorbiaceae
- Genus: Excoecaria
- Species: E. cochinchinensis

Binomial name
- Excoecaria cochinchinensis Lour.

Synonyms
- Sapium cochinchinense (Lour.) Kuntze; Excoecaria bicolor (Hassk.) Zoll. ex Hassk.; Excoecaria bicolor var. orientalis (Pax & K.Hoffm.) Gagnep.; Excoecaria bicolor var. purpurascens Pax & K.Hoffm.; Excoecaria bicolor var. viridis Pax & K.Hoffm.; Excoecaria cochinchinensis var. viridis (Pax & K.Hoffm.) Merr.; Excoecaria orientalis Pax & K.Hoffm.; Excoecaria quadrangularis Müll.Arg.; Antidesma bicolor Hassk.

= Excoecaria cochinchinensis =

Species of flowering plant

Excoecaria cochinchinensis is a species of flowering plant in the spurge family, Euphorbiaceae. It is sometimes referred to by the common names Chinese croton, blindness tree, buta buta, and jungle fire plant. It is native to Southeast China, Hainan, Laos, Malaysia, Myanmar, Taiwan, Thailand, and Vietnam.

It is a subtropical evergreen shrub with a woody stem, growing up to 1–2 meters (3.3–6.6 ft) high. Its leaves are opposite, their texture shiny and papery, the upper surface dark green or variegated and the underside a deep maroon. The leaves measure 6–14 cm by 2–4 cm (2.4–5.5 in by 0.8–1.6 in). It is dioecious.

== Etymology ==
The common name of blindness tree comes from Latin, "excoecaria", to make blind. Sap in the eyes is reported to causes blindness. The Latin name cochinchinensis derives from Cochinchina, an old name for Vietnam.

== Uses ==
Excoecaria cochinchinensis is cultivated as an ornamental tropical plant, greenhouse plant, or houseplant. A popular colorful cultivar is "Firestorm."

== Precautions ==
As with many of the Euphorbiaceae, the sap is toxic and can cause skin eczema in some people. It is also toxic if eaten, though in small quantities, it has been used in herbal medicine to treat gastric ulcers.

Though the plant is considered poisonous, it has beneficial uses as an antiparasitic, antipruritic, and haemostatic treatment.
