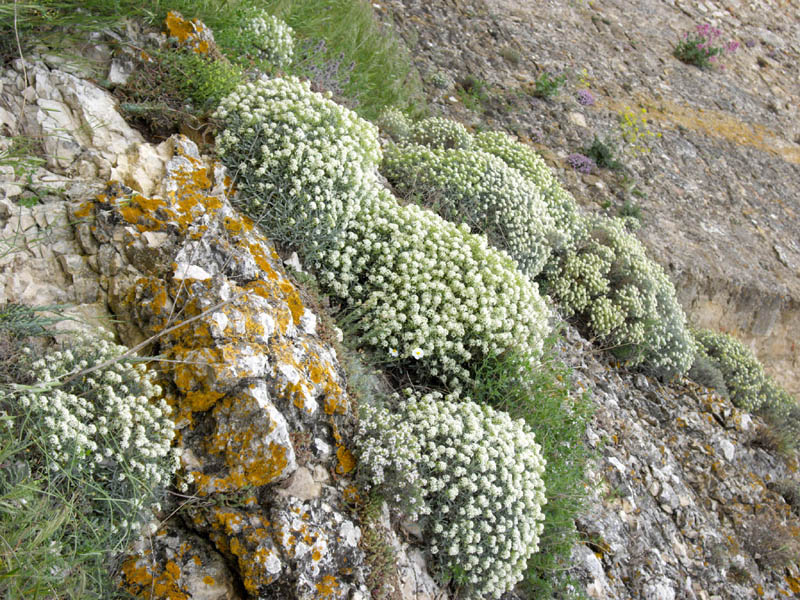

Scientific classification
- Kingdom: Plantae
- Clade: Tracheophytes
- Clade: Angiosperms
- Clade: Eudicots
- Clade: Rosids
- Order: Brassicales
- Family: Brassicaceae
- Genus: Hormathophylla
- Species: H. spinosa

Binomial name
- Hormathophylla spinosa L.

Synonyms
- List: Adyseton spinosum (L.) Link; Alyssum spinosum L.; Anodontea spinosa (L.) Sweet; Clypeola spinosa (L.) Link; Draba spinosa (L.) Lam.; Koniga spinosa (L.) Spach; Ptilotrichum spinosum (L.) Boiss.

= Hormathophylla spinosa =

Species of flowering plant

Hormathophylla spinosa, formerly Alyssum spinosum, the spiny madwort, is a species of flowering subshrub in the genus Hormathophylla of the family Brassicaceae, native to open rocky sites in south-eastern France and southern Spain. It forms a compact mound up to 30 cm in height. Dense spiny branches of tiny, toothed grey-green leaves bear racemes of white flowers at the tips in early summer.

It is especially cultivated in rock gardens. The cultivar H spinosa 'Roseum', with pink flowers, has gained the Royal Horticultural Society's Award of Garden Merit.

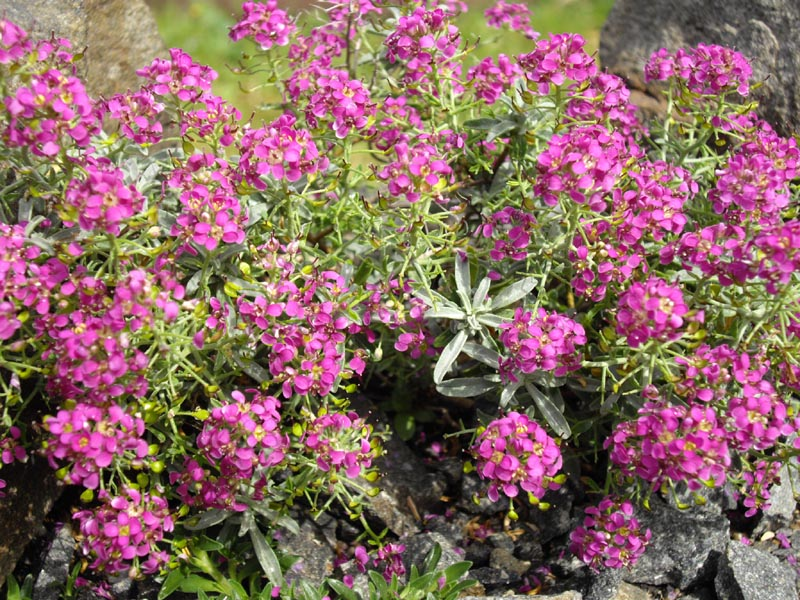
'Purpureum'

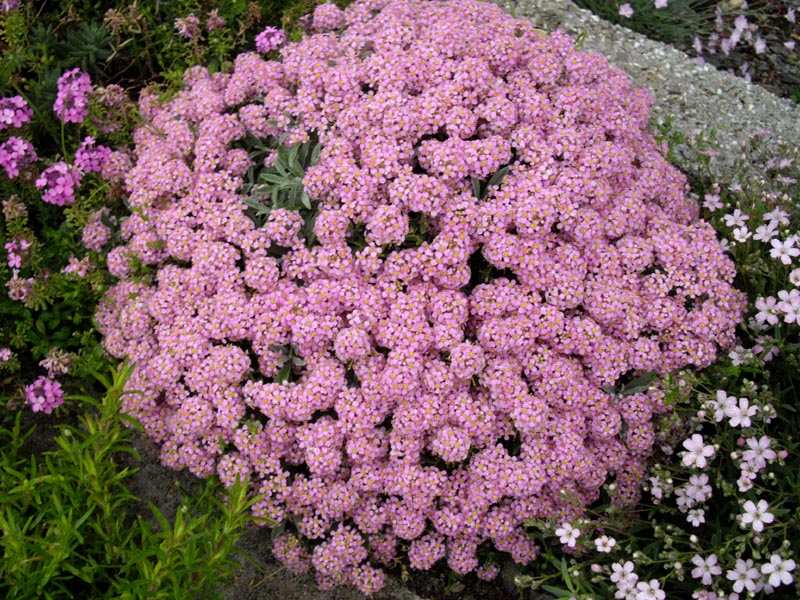
'Roseum'
