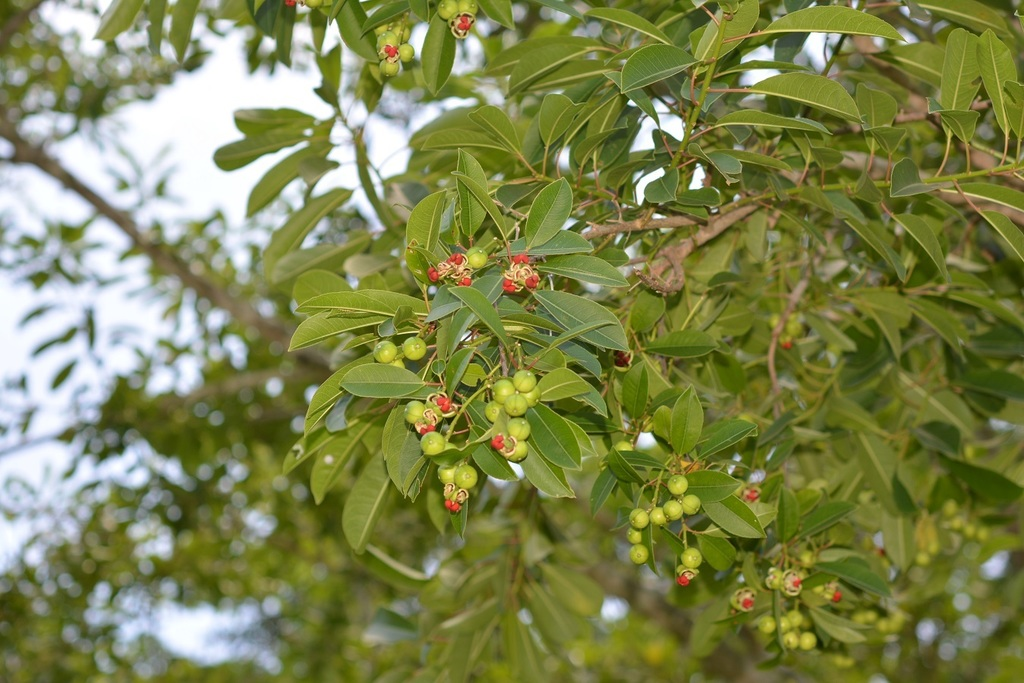

Scientific classification
- Kingdom: Plantae
- Clade: Tracheophytes
- Clade: Angiosperms
- Clade: Eudicots
- Clade: Rosids
- Order: Malpighiales
- Family: Euphorbiaceae
- Genus: Sapium
- Species: S. macrocarpum

Binomial name
- Sapium macrocarpum Müll.Arg.

Synonyms
- Excoecaria macrocarpa Sapium bourgeaui Sapium dolichostachys Sapium mexicanum Sapium pedicellatum Sapium thelocarpum

= Sapium macrocarpum =

Species of flowering plant

Sapium macrocarpum is a species of flowering plant in the family Euphorbiaceae. It is native to Mexico and Central America.
