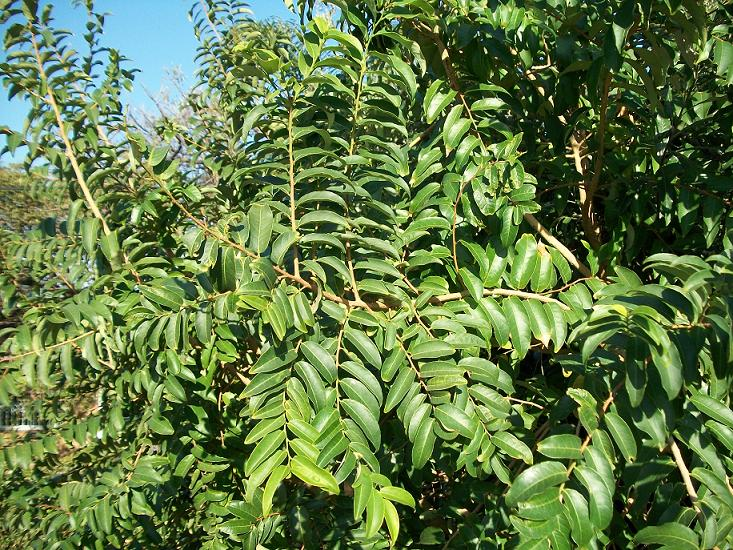
- Branchlets and foliage
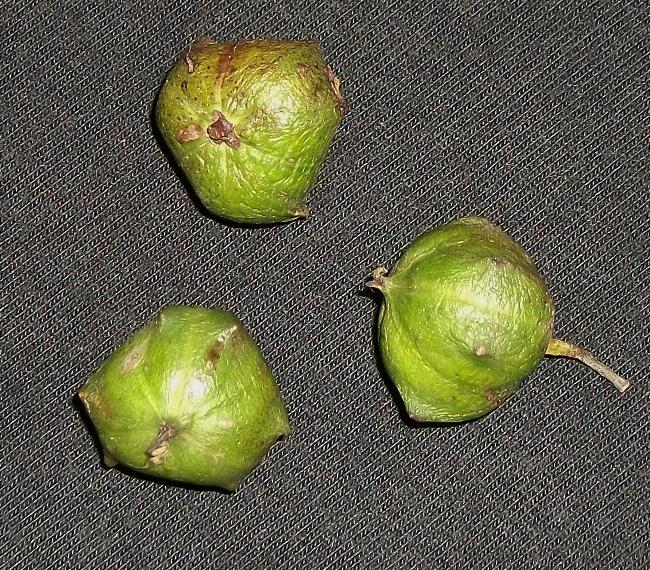
- fruit (duiker berries)

Conservation status
- Least Concern (IUCN 3.1)

Scientific classification
- Kingdom: Plantae
- Clade: Tracheophytes
- Clade: Angiosperms
- Clade: Eudicots
- Clade: Rosids
- Order: Malpighiales
- Family: Euphorbiaceae
- Genus: Sclerocroton
- Species: S. integerrimus

Binomial name
- Sclerocroton integerrimus Hochst.

Synonyms
- Excoecaria integerrima (Hochst.) Müll.Arg.; Sapium integerrimum (Hochst.) J.Léonard; Stillingia integerrima (Hochst.) Baill.; Excoecaria hochstetteriana Müll.Arg.; Excoecaria reticulata (Hochst.) Müll.Arg.; Sapium armatum Pax & K.Hoffm.; Sapium reticulatum (Hochst.) Pax; Sclerocroton reticulatus Hochst.; Tragia integerrima Hochst.; Tragia natalensis Hochst.

= Sclerocroton integerrimus =

Duiker berry

Species of tree

Sclerocroton integerrimus, the duiker berry, is a tree in the family Euphorbiaceae. It is from Southern Africa.

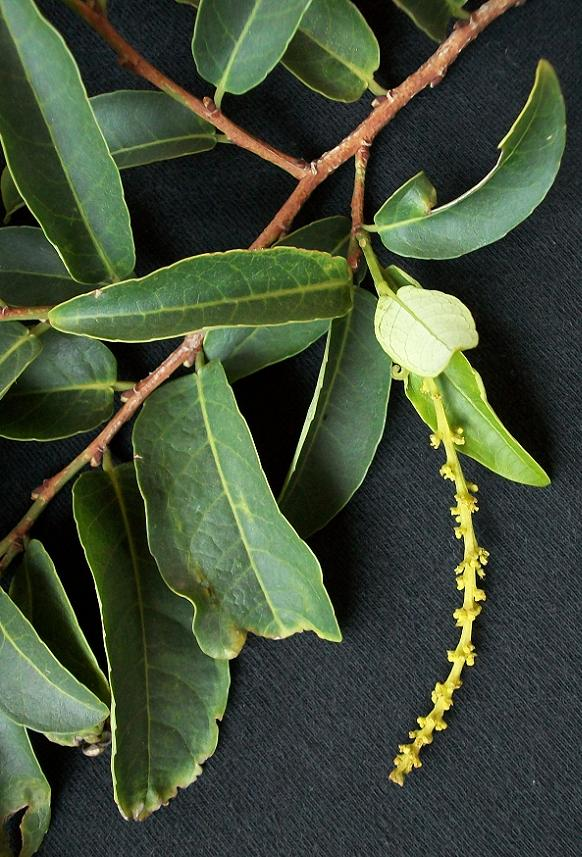
Leaves and inflorescence

== Taxonomy ==
This species was originally named as two species; Sclerocroton integerrimus Hochst. (1845) and S. reticulatus Hochst. (1845). When Sclerocroton integerrimus was united for the first time, Baillon (in Adansonia 3: 162. 1863) adopted the name Stillingia integerrima (Hochst.) Baill. for the combined taxon.

This tree has also been named Sapium integerrimum; with most literature referring to it by this name (2010).

== Distribution ==
Found from the coastal areas of KwaZulu-Natal, South Africa, to Mozambique and Botswana.

== Description ==
A small to medium-sized tree growing up to 15m tall.

=== Stem and branches ===
Single or multi-stemmed, with smooth pale grey bark, and arching, weeping branches. The branchlets are reddish-brown, later becoming grey-brown in colour.

=== Leaves ===
The leaves are alternate, shiny and dark-green above, and paler beneath. The leaves are ovate-lanceolate to ovate-oblong in shape, with entire or shallowly serrated leaf margins. The leaf petioles are 3–5 mm long, and the leaf blades 20–100 mm long and 10–50 mm wide.

=== Flowers ===
Small yellowish flowers are produced on terminal spikes. The flowers are either all male or with one female flower at the base of the spike.

=== Fruit ===
The fruit is a 3-lobed capsule up to 25 mm in diameter. The fruit opens by splitting into three roughly circular parts, with each of the 6 valves bearing a shortly-conical appendage (horn) 2 mm long. When ripe; the fruit are green or coppery in colour, and leathery in texture. Each of the cocci bears one seed enclosed in a 2 mm thick woody endocarp. The seeds are 7 × 5 mm in size, ovoid-ellipsoid in shape, smooth surfaced, and dull, pale greyish-brown flecked and spotted with darker brown.

=== Wood ===
The wood is heavy, hard and durable.

== Uses ==
The leaves are used in traditional medicine as a mouth wash and to treat toothache. The fruit have been used to make black ink and for tanning, and the wood has been used to make furniture and for hut building. The fruit are eaten by livestock.

== Ecological significance ==
This is one of the larval food plants for two species of butterfly; Sevenia boisduvali and Sevenia natalensis. The leaves are also eaten by bushbuck and red duiker. The fruit are eaten by antelope, and birds such as crowned hornbills.
