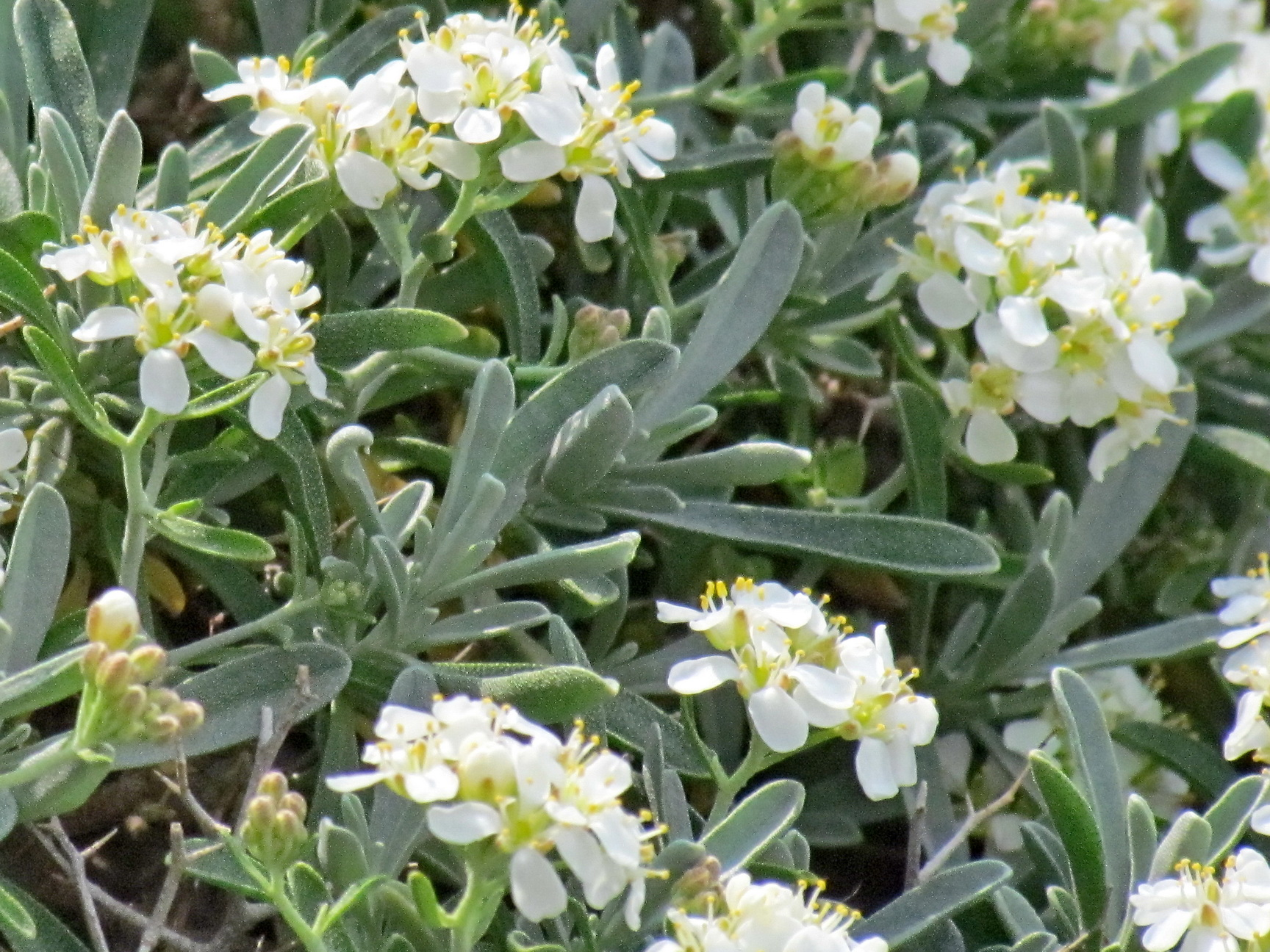
- Hormathophylla spinosa

Scientific classification
- Kingdom: Plantae
- Clade: Tracheophytes
- Clade: Angiosperms
- Clade: Eudicots
- Clade: Rosids
- Order: Brassicales
- Family: Brassicaceae
- Tribe: Alysseae
- Genus: Hormathophylla; Cullen & T.R.Dudley

Species
- See text

Synonyms
- Nevadensia Rivas Mart.

= Hormathophylla =

Genus of Brassicaceae plants

Hormathophylla is a genus of flowering plants in the family Brassicaceae, native to the western Mediterranean; Morocco, Algeria, Spain, France and Italy. Perennial shrubs, they are adapted to dry, alkaline soils with high levels of magnesium.

== Species ==
Currently accepted species include:

- Hormathophylla cadevalliana (Pau) T.R.Dudley
- Hormathophylla cochleata (Coss. & Durieu) P.Küpfer
- Hormathophylla halimifolia (Boiss.) P.Küpfer
- Hormathophylla lapeyrouseana (Jord.) P.Küpfer
- Hormathophylla longicaulis (Boiss.) Cullen & T.R.Dudley
- Hormathophylla purpurea (Lag. & Rodr.) P.Küpfer
- Hormathophylla pyrenaica (Lapeyr.) Cullen & T.R.Dudley
- Hormathophylla reverchonii (Degen & Hervier) Cullen & T.R.Dudley
- Hormathophylla saxigena (Jord. & Fourr.) D.A.German & Govaerts
- Hormathophylla spinosa (L.) P.Küpfer
