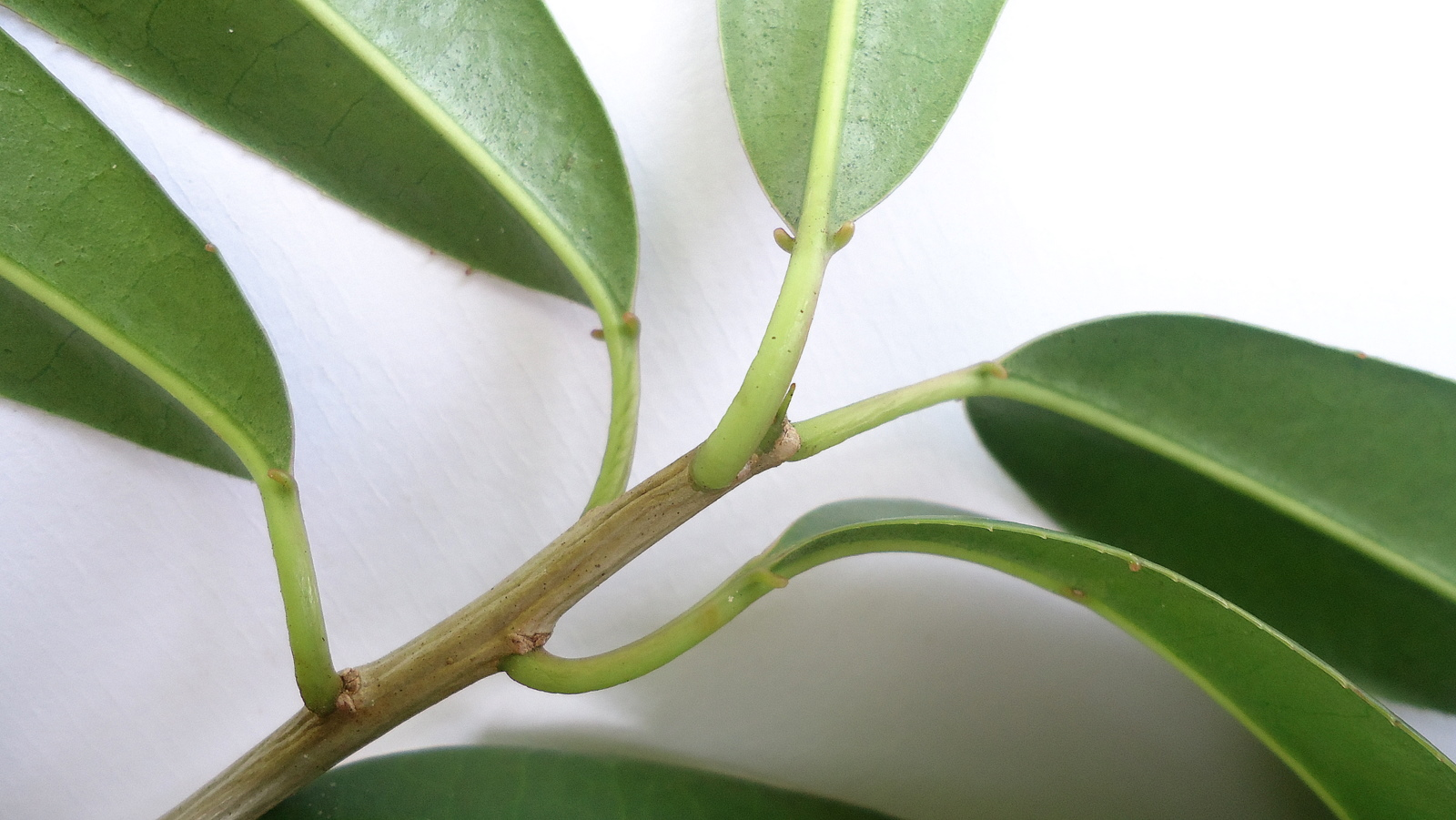

Conservation status
- Least Concern (IUCN 3.1)

Scientific classification
- Kingdom: Plantae
- Clade: Tracheophytes
- Clade: Angiosperms
- Clade: Eudicots
- Clade: Rosids
- Order: Malpighiales
- Family: Euphorbiaceae
- Genus: Sapium
- Species: S. glandulosum

Binomial name
- Sapium glandulosum (L.) Morong

Synonyms
- many

= Sapium glandulosum =

Species of tree

Sapium glandulosum is a species of tree in the family Euphorbiaceae. It is native to the Neotropics from Mexico and the Caribbean south to Argentina, and it has been cultivated elsewhere. It is the most common Sapium species. Its common names include gumtree, milktree, leche de olivo, and olivo macho.

This is a species of tree up to 30 meters tall, usually with some buttress roots and multiple trunks. Smaller woody parts can have short, thick spines. It has a thin, patchy, peeling, scarred outer bark and a granular inner bark. It produces large amounts of milky latex. The alternately arranged leaves have toothed oblong or oval leaves up to 27 centimeters long by 8 wide. New leaves have gland-tipped teeth. The species is monoecious. The inflorescence is a spikelike arrangement of clusters of male flowers with a few female flowers at the base. The tiny rounded purple male flower is barely over a millimeter long. The female flower has 3 styles about 2 millimeters long. The fruit is a greenish-brown, rounded capsule up to a centimeter long which splits into 3 segments, each holding a seed. The seed is covered in a thin layer of red pulp.

This tree grows in tropical moist and wet forests.

The copious latex is of high quality and can be used to make rubber. It is difficult to harvest, so it is not commercially useful.
