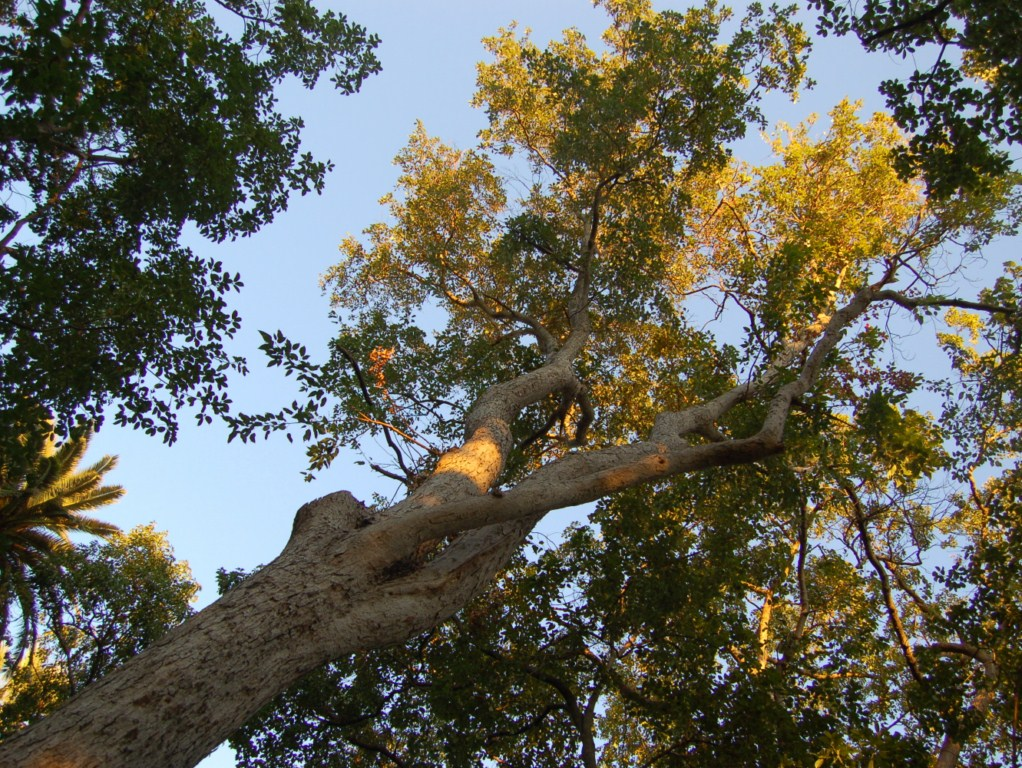

Conservation status
- Least Concern (IUCN 3.1)

Scientific classification
- Kingdom: Plantae
- Clade: Tracheophytes
- Clade: Angiosperms
- Clade: Eudicots
- Clade: Rosids
- Order: Sapindales
- Family: Sapindaceae
- Genus: Acer
- Section: Acer sect. Pentaphylla
- Series: Acer ser. Trifida
- Species: A. oblongum

Binomial name
- Acer oblongum Wall. ex DC. (1824)

Varieties
- Acer oblongum var. itoanum Hayata; Acer oblongum var. oblongum; Acer oblongum var. omeiense W.P.Fang & Soong

Synonyms
- List: Acer buzimpala Buch.-Ham. ex D.Don; Acer itoanum (Hayata) H.L.Li; Acer laikuanii Ling; Acer lanceolatum Molliard; Acer laurifolium D.Don; Acer nepalense Dippel; Acer oblongifolium Dippel; Euacer laevifolium Opiz

= Acer oblongum =

Species of maple

Acer oblongum, common name Himalayan maple, evergreen maple and Kashmir maple, is an evergreen Asian species of maple in the family Sapindaceae.

== Description ==
Acer oblongum is a medium-sized evergreen to semi-deciduous tree reaching a height of approximately 15–22 metres (49–72 ft). Unique among maples, this plant stays green all winter. The trunks are buttressed, with a smooth to wrinkled bark. Leaves are opposite, ovate-lanceolate with entire margin, with a petiole 5–12 cm long, with glaucous-green underside and dark green upperside. The young shoots are reddish bronze and finely hairy. The flowers are hermaphroditic, small and inconspicuous, about 4 mm, greenish white, gathered in hairy racemes. The fruits are represented by the typical two-winged samaras, about 2.5 cm long, wind dispersed. It has been introduced for its wood and it is sometimes cultivated in large gardens for its evergreen foliage.

== Distribution ==
Acer oblongum is widespread across central, eastern, and southeastern Asia, from Tibet and northern India east as far as Japan, including southern China, and northern Indochina.

=== Varieties ===
Three varieties are accepted.

- Acer oblongum var. itoanum Hayata – Ryukyu Islands
- Acer oblongum var. oblongum – northeastern Pakistan to central and southern China and northern Indochina
- Acer oblongum var. omeiense W.P.Fang & Soong – Sichuan

== Habitat ==
Acer oblongum prefers humid climate of the Himalayan forests, especially along streams, at an elevation of about 600–2,000 metres (2,000–6,600 ft) above sea level.
