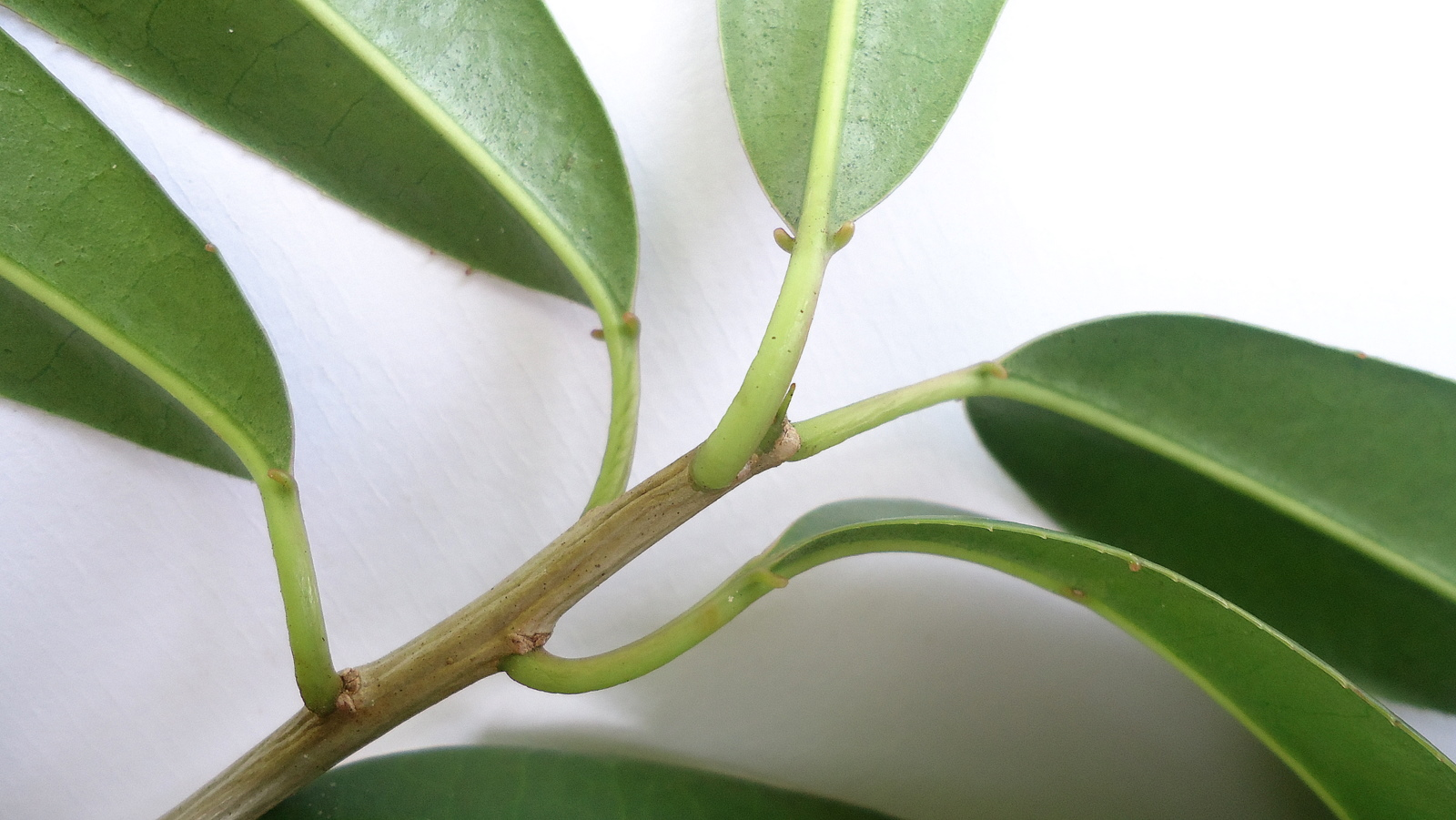
- Sapium glandulosum

Scientific classification
- Kingdom: Plantae
- Clade: Tracheophytes
- Clade: Angiosperms
- Clade: Eudicots
- Clade: Rosids
- Order: Malpighiales
- Family: Euphorbiaceae
- Subfamily: Euphorbioideae
- Tribe: Hippomaneae
- Subtribe: Hippomaninae
- Genus: Sapium; Jacq.

Synonyms
- Sapiopsis Müll.Arg.; Seborium Raf.

= Sapium =

Milktrees

Genus of flowering plants

Sapium is a genus of flowering plants in the family Euphorbiaceae. It is widespread across most of Latin America and the West Indies. Many Old World species were formerly included in the genus, but recent authors have redistributed all the Old World species into other genera.

Species are known commonly as milktrees.

== Description ==
These are shrubs and trees. They produce latex. The leaves are alternately arranged and smooth-edged or toothed. They are monoecious, often with spikelike or raceme-shaped inflorescences that have several male flowers, plus a few female flowers near the base. The male flowers have 2 to 4 stamens. The female flowers have 2 to 4 styles which are sometimes coiled. The flowers lack petals. The fruit has 2 to 4 lobes and may split open or not.

Species

1. Sapium adenodon - Cuba
2. Sapium allenii - Costa Rica
3. Sapium argutum - Fr Guiana, Suriname, Amapá, Fernando de Noronha
4. Sapium ciliatum - Fr Guiana, Suriname, Pará
5. Sapium cuneatum - Jamaica
6. Sapium daphnoides - Cuba, Hispaniola
7. Sapium glandulosum - Mexico, West Indies, Central + S America to Uruguay
8. Sapium haematospermum - Brazil, Bolivia, Paraguay, N Argentina, Uruguay
9. Sapium haitiense - Massif de la Hotte, Haiti
10. Sapium jenmannii - Guyana, Venezuela, Colombia, NW Brazil; naturalised in Trinidad
11. Sapium lateriflorum - C + S Mexico, Central America
12. Sapium laurifolium - Chiapas, Greater Antilles, Central America, NW South America
13. Sapium laurocerasus - Puerto Rico
14. Sapium leucogynum - Cuba
15. Sapium macrocarpum - Mexico, Central America
16. Sapium marmieri - Bolivia, Peru, Ecuador, Colombia, NW Brazil
17. Sapium obovatum - Brazil, Bolivia, Paraguay
18. Sapium pachystachys - Nicaragua, Costa Rica, Panama
19. Sapium pallidum - Bahia, Minas Gerais
20. Sapium parvifolium - Cuba
21. Sapium paucinervium - NE South America
22. Sapium sellowianum - Minas Gerais, São Paulo
23. Sapium stylare - Costa Rica, Panama, Venezuela, Colombia, Ecuador

== Toxicity ==
The milky sap of Sapium biloculare is poisonous if it comes into contact with the eyes, mucous membranes, stomach or bloodstream. It was used in arrow poison and to stupefy fish.
