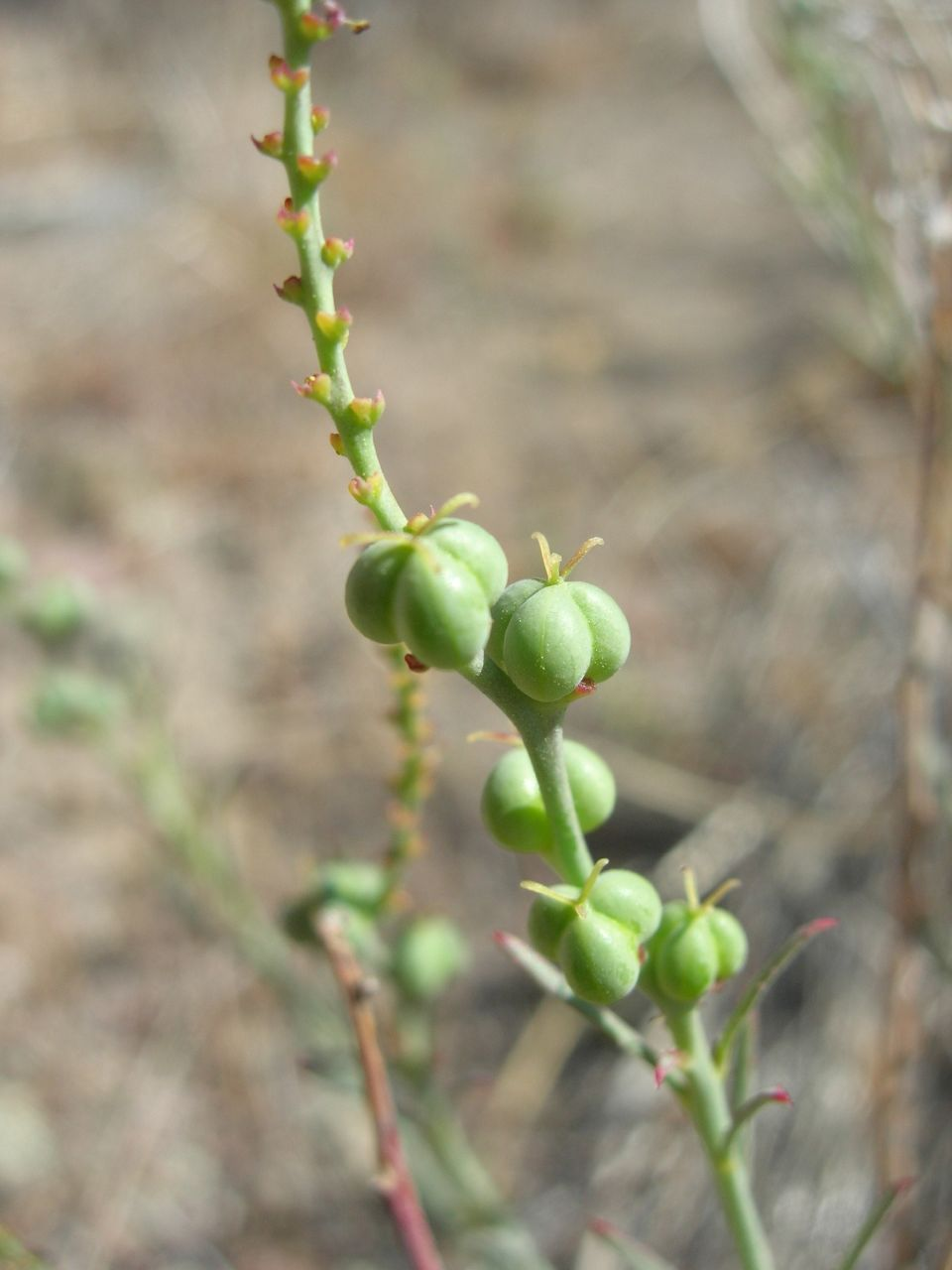
- Stillingia linearifolia

Scientific classification
- Kingdom: Plantae
- Clade: Embryophytes
- Clade: Tracheophytes
- Clade: Spermatophytes
- Clade: Angiosperms
- Clade: Eudicots
- Clade: Rosids
- Order: Malpighiales
- Family: Euphorbiaceae
- Subfamily: Euphorbioideae
- Tribe: Hippomaneae
- Subtribe: Hippomaninae
- Genus: Stillingia; Garden ex L. 1767 (Syst. Nat. (ed. 12) 2: 611, 637) not L. 1767 (Mant. Pl. 1:19)

Synonyms
- Gymnostillingia Müll.Arg.

= Stillingia =

Genus of flowering plants

Stillingia is a plant genus of the family Euphorbiaceae, first described for modern science as a genus in 1767. The genus is native to Latin America, the southern United States, and various islands in the Pacific and Indian Oceans. Toothleaf is a common name for plants in this genus.

It is known to contain diterpene esters.

It can grow up to 4 feet, but most Toothleaf do not.

== Medical use ==
Stillingia sylvatica was used by Native Americans for syphilis and as a cathartic, diuretic, laxative, and emetic. In large doses, it causes vomiting and diarrhea.

Stillingia root is one of the ingredients in Hoxsey Herbal Therapy, which is promoted as an alternative cancer treatment. There is no medical evidence to support use of Stillingia to treat cancer, infections, or other medical conditions.

== Taxonomy ==
Species include:

1. Stillingia acutifolia - Mexico, Guatemala, Honduras
2. Stillingia aquatica - Georgia, Florida, Alabama, S Carolina
3. Stillingia argutedentata - Minas Gerais
4. Stillingia bicarpellaris - San Luis Potosí, Hidalgo, Coahuila
5. Stillingia bodenbenderi - São Paulo, Córdoba
6. Stillingia dichotoma - Bahia, Rio de Janeiro
7. Stillingia diphtherina - S Mexico, Guatemala, Honduras
8. Stillingia dusenii - Paraná
9. Stillingia linearifolia - SW USA, N + S Baja California, Sonora, Guadalupe I
10. Stillingia lineata - Réunion, Mauritius, Philippines, Maluku, Lesser Sunda Is, Fiji
11. Stillingia oppositifolia - Rio Grande do Sul, Minas Gerais
12. Stillingia parvifolia - Peru
13. Stillingia paucidentata - S California, SW Arizona
14. Stillingia peruviana - Huancavelica
15. Stillingia pietatis - Michoacán
16. Stillingia querceticola - Nayarit
17. Stillingia salpingadenia - Brazil, Bolivia, Paraguay, N Argentina
18. Stillingia sanguinolenta - C + S Mexico, Honduras
19. Stillingia saxatilis - Bahia, Minas Gerais
20. Stillingia scutellifera - Paraguay, Misiones
21. Stillingia spinulosa - SW USA, Baja California, Sonora
22. Stillingia sylvatica - SE + SC USA
23. Stillingia tenella - Bolivia, Jujuy
24. Stillingia terminalis - Madagascar
25. Stillingia texana - Texas, Oklahoma, Coahuila
26. Stillingia trapezoidea - Piauí
27. Stillingia treculiana - Texas, Nuevo León, Coahuila
28. Stillingia uleana - Bahia, Minas Gerais
29. Stillingia zelayensis - C + S Mexico, Central America

Many species formerly in Stillingia have been moved to other genera, including Actinostemon, Adenopeltis, Anomostachys, Balakata, Bonania, Ditrysinia, Excoecaria, Grimmeodendron, Gymnanthes, Homalanthus, Maprounea, Microstachys, Neoshirakia, Sapium, Sclerocroton, Sebastiania, Shirakiopsis, Spegazziniophytum, Spirostachys, and Triadica.

1. S. africana - Spirostachys africana
2. S. agallocha - Excoecaria agallocha
3. S. appendiculata - Sebastiania appendiculata
4. S. arborescens - Sebastiania granatensis
5. S. asperococca - Microstachys chamaelea
6. S. aucuparia - Sapium glandulosum
7. S. baccata - Balakata baccata
8. S. bahiensis - Sebastiania bahiensis
9. S. bidentata - Microstachys bidentata
10. S. biglandulosa - Sapium glandulosum
11. S. bingyrica Baill. - Shirakiopsis indica
12. S. brasiliensis - Sebastiania brasiliensis
13. S. brevifolia - Sebastiania brevifolia
14. S. campestris - Microstachys corniculata
15. S. chamaelea - Microstachys chamaelea
16. S. cochinchinensis - Triadica cochinchinensis
17. S. commersoniana - Sebastiania klotzschiana
18. S. concolor - Actinostemon concolor
19. S. coriacea - Microstachys marginata
20. S. corniculata - Microstachys corniculata
21. S. cremostachys - Sebastiania klotzschiana
22. S. crotonoides - Microstachys hispida
23. S. cruenta - Sebastiania cruenta
24. S. cubana - Bonania cubana
25. S. daphniphylla - Sebastiania daphniphylla
26. S. desertorum - Sebastiania brasiliensis
27. S. discolor Champ. ex Benth. 1854 - Triadica cochinchinensis
28. S. discolor (Spreng.) Baill. 1865 - Gymnanthes discolor
29. S. diversifolia - Shirakiopsis indica
30. S. dracunculoides - Sapium glandulosum
31. S. eglandulosa - Grimmeodendron eglandulosum
32. S. elliptica - Shirakiopsis elliptica
33. S. frutescens - Ditrysinia fruticosa
34. S. fruticosa - Ditrysinia fruticosa
35. S. gaudichaudii - Gymnanthes gaudichaudii
36. S. glabrata - Gymnanthes glabrata
37. S. glandulosa - Adenopeltis serrata
38. S. goudotiana - Excoecaria goudotiana
39. S. guianensis - Maprounea guianensis
40. S. guineensis - Excoecaria guineensis
41. S. haematantha - Sapium glandulosum
42. S. hastata - Microstachys ditassoides
43. S. heterodoxa - Microstachys heterodoxa
44. S. hilariana - Maprounea guianensis
45. S. himalayensis - Excoecaria acerifolia
46. S. hippomane - Sapium glandulosum
47. S. hypoleuca - Gymnanthes hypoleuca
48. S. indica - Shirakiopsis indica
49. S. integerrima - Sclerocroton integerrimus
50. S. jacobinensis - Sebastiania jacobinensis
51. S. japonica - Neoshirakia japonica
52. S. lanceolaria - Triadica cochinchinensis
53. S. lastellei - Anomostachys lastellei
54. S. laureola - Sebastiania laureola
55. S. laurifolia - Sapium laurifolium
56. S. laurocerasus - Sapium laurocerasum
57. S. ligustrina - Ditrysinia fruticosa
58. S. luschnathiana - Gymnanthes glabrata
59. S. madagascariensis - Excoecaria madagascariensis
60. S. marginata - Sapium glandulosum
61. S. melanosticta - Sclerocroton melanostictus
62. S. multiramea - Gymnanthes glabrata
63. S. myrtilloides - Microstachys daphnoides
64. S. nervosa - Gymnanthes nervosa
65. S. nutans - Homalanthus nutans
66. S. obovata - Sapium obovatum
67. S. pachystachya - Sebastiania pachystachya
68. S. paniculata - Balakata baccata
69. S. patagonica - Spegazziniophytum patagonicum
70. S. phyllanthiformis - Sebastiania schottiana
71. S. populnea - Homalanthus populneus
72. S. prostrata - Microstachys corniculata
73. S. prunifolia - Sapium glandulosum
74. S. pteroclada - Sebastiania pteroclada
75. S. ramosissima - Sebastiania brasiliensis
76. S. rigida - Sebastiania rigida
77. S. salicifolia Klotzsch ex Baill. 1865 not (Torr.) Raf. 1832 nor Small 1903 - Sapium haematospermum
78. S. schottiana - Sebastiania schottiana
79. S. sebifera - Triadica sebifera
80. S. sellowiana - Microstachys corniculata
81. S. serrata - Sebastiania serrata
82. S. serrulata - Microstachys serrulata
83. S. sinensis - Triadica sebifera
84. S. stipulacea - Microstachys stipulacea
85. S. thouarsiana - Excoecaria thouarsiana
86. S. trinervia - Sebastiania trinervia
87. S. velutina - Microstachys corniculata
88. S. virgata - Microstachys bidentata
89. S. weddelliana - Sebastiania weddelliana
90. S. widgrenii - Gymnanthes widgrenii
91. S. ypanemensis - Sebastiania ypanemensis
