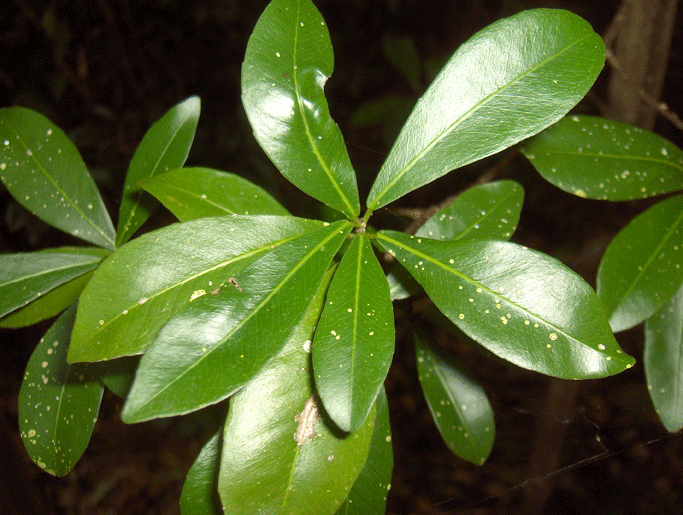
- Gymnanthes lucida in Florida

Scientific classification
- Kingdom: Plantae
- Clade: Tracheophytes
- Clade: Angiosperms
- Clade: Eudicots
- Clade: Rosids
- Order: Malpighiales
- Family: Euphorbiaceae
- Subfamily: Euphorbioideae
- Tribe: Hippomaneae
- Subtribe: Hippomaninae
- Genus: Gymnanthes; Sw.

Type species
- Gymnanthes lucida Sw.

Synonyms
- Ateramnus P.Browne; Duvigneaudia J.Léonard; Gussonia Spreng.; Gymnanthus Endl.; Sarothrostachys Klotzsch

= Gymnanthes =

Oysterwood

Genus of flowering plants

Gymnanthes is a genus of flowering plants in the spurge family, Euphorbiaceae, first described as a genus in 1788. It is found primarily in the warmer parts of the Western Hemisphere (from Florida and Mexico south to Argentina), but with some species in central Africa and southwestern Southeast Asia.

Members of the genus are commonly known as oysterwood. The genus has 45 species and is pantropical.

Species

1. Gymnanthes actinostemoides - Mexico
2. Gymnanthes albicans - Cuba
3. Gymnanthes belizensis - Belize
4. Gymnanthes borneensis - Borneo, Malaysia, Sumatra
5. Gymnanthes boticario - Brazil
6. Gymnanthes discolor - Brazil, Argentina, Paraguay
7. Gymnanthes dressleri - Panama
8. Gymnanthes elliptica - Jamaica
9. Gymnanthes farinosa - Guadeloupe, Saint Lucia, Dominica
10. Gymnanthes gaudichaudii - Bahia, Rio de Janeiro state
11. Gymnanthes glabrata - Bahia, Rio de Janeiro state
12. Gymnanthes glandulosa - Glandular oysterwood - Cuba, Jamaica
13. Gymnanthes guyanensis - Rupununi
14. Gymnanthes hypoleuca - Lesser Antilles, S Venezuela, N Brazil
15. Gymnanthes inopinata - Cameroon, Gabon, Republic of the Congo, Democratic Republic of the Congo
16. Gymnanthes insolita - Nayarit
17. Gymnanthes integra - Jamaica
18. Gymnanthes leonardii-crispi - Democratic Republic of the Congo, Uganda
19. Gymnanthes longipes - Mexico
20. Gymnanthes lucida - Florida, Bahamas, Caribbean, Mexico, Central America
21. Gymnanthes nervosa - Bolivia, Paraguay, Rio de Janeiro state
22. Gymnanthes pallens - Cuba, Hispaniola
23. Gymnanthes recurva - Cuba
24. Gymnanthes remota - Sumatra
25. Gymnanthes riparia - Mexico, Central America
26. Gymnanthes widgrenii - Minas Gerais

Species

moved to other genera: Actinostemon Ditrysinia Microstachys Sebastiania Stillingia

1. G. angustifolia - Sebastiania schottiana
2. G. bahiensis - Sebastiania bahiensis
3. G. brachyclada - Sebastiania klotzschiana
4. G. brachypoda - Actinostemon brachypodus
5. G. brasiliensis - Sebastiania brasiliensis
6. G. brevifolia - Sebastiania brevifolia
7. G. concolor - Actinostemon concolor
8. G. granatensis - Sebastiania granatensis
9. G. jacobinensis - Sebastiania jacobinensis
10. G. klotzschiana - Sebastiania klotzschiana
11. G. ligustrina - Ditrysinia fruticosa
12. G. macrocarpa - Sebastiania macrocarpa
13. G. marginata - Sebastiania klotzschiana
14. G. pavoniana - Sebastiania pavoniana
15. G. pringlei - Sebastiania pavoniana
16. G. pteroclada - Sebastiania pteroclada
17. G. rigida - Sebastiania rigida
18. G. schomburgkii - Actinostemon schomburgkii
19. G. schottiana - Sebastiania schottiana
20. G. serrata - Sebastiania serrata
21. G. stipulacea - Microstachys stipulacea
22. G. treculiana - Stillingia treculiana
23. G. trinervia - Sebastiania trinervia
24. G. ypanemensis - Sebastiania ypanemensis
