= Doa ampla =

Scientific classification
- Kingdom: Animalia
- Phylum: Arthropoda
- Class: Insecta
- Order: Lepidoptera
- Superfamily: Drepanoidea
- Family: Doidae
- Genus: Doa
- Species: D. ampla

Binomial name
- Doa ampla (Grote, 1878)

Synonyms
- Emydia ampla Grote, 1878

Species of moth

Doa ampla is a moth of the family Doidae. It is found from western Texas and Colorado to Arizona, south into Mexico.

The wingspan is about 37 mm.

Larvae have been recorded on feeding on the leaves of Stillingia texana. They probably feed on other Stillingia species as well.
