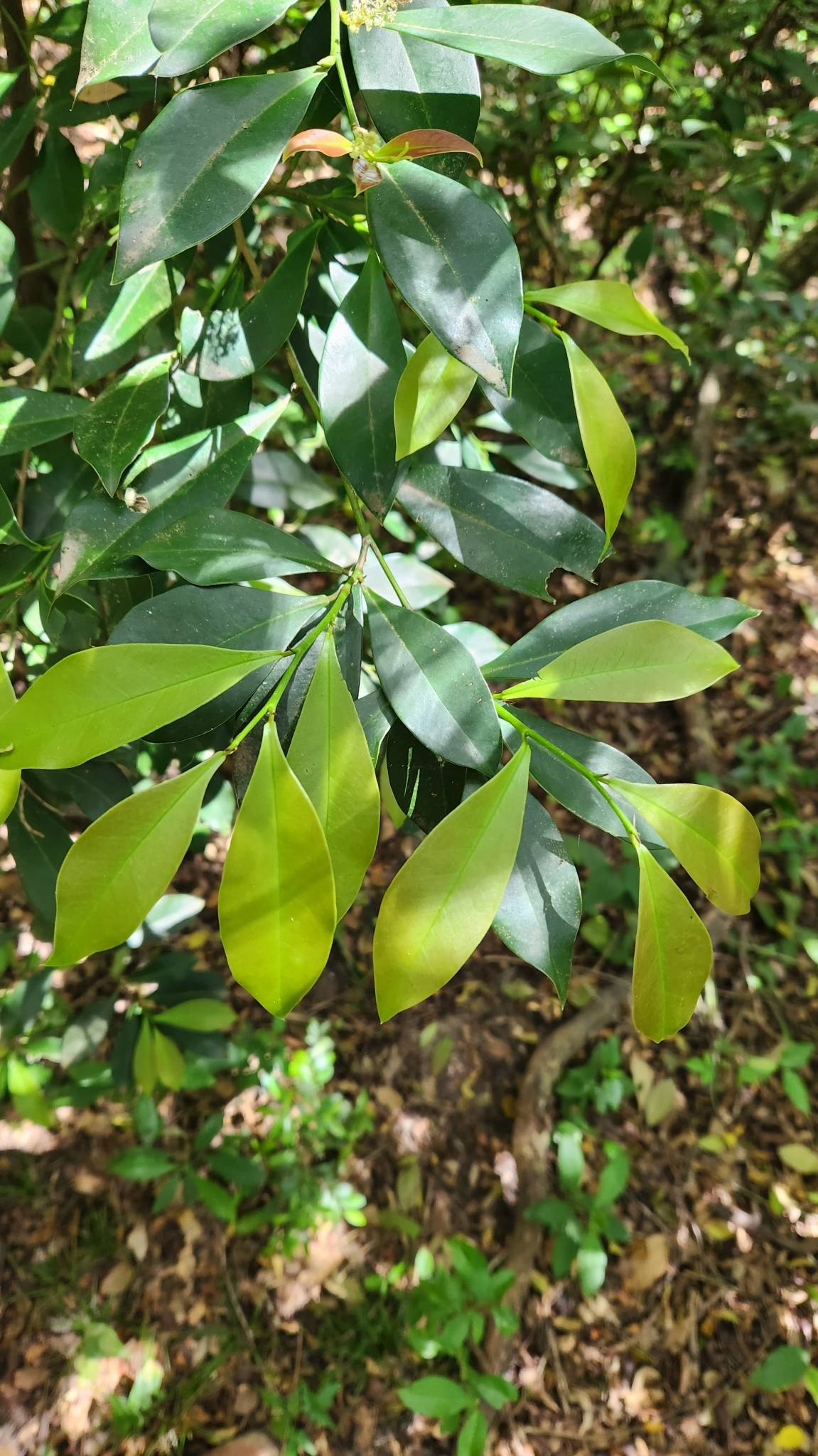
- Actinostemon concolor

Scientific classification
- Kingdom: Plantae
- Clade: Tracheophytes
- Clade: Angiosperms
- Clade: Eudicots
- Clade: Rosids
- Order: Malpighiales
- Family: Euphorbiaceae
- Subfamily: Euphorbioideae
- Tribe: Hippomaneae
- Subtribe: Hippomaninae
- Genus: Actinostemon; Mart. ex Klotzsch

Synonyms
- Dactylostemon Klotzsch; Actinostema Lindl., spelling variant

= Actinostemon =

Genus of flowering plants

Actinostemon is a plant genus of the family Euphorbiaceae first described as a genus in 1841. It is native to South America, Central America, and the West Indies.

Species

1. Actinostemon amazonicus - Peru, S Venezuela, N Brazil
2. Actinostemon brachypodus - Pinar del Río, La Habana
3. Actinostemon caribaeus - Costa Rica, Nicaragua, Lesser Antilles, Trinidad, N Venezuela
4. Actinostemon concepcionis - Paraguay, S Brazil, Corrientes
5. Actinostemon concolor - Paraguay, S Brazil, Uruguay, Bolivia, Misiones
6. Actinostemon desertorum - S Brazil
7. Actinostemon echinatus - Pernambuco, Rio de Janeiro
8. Actinostemon glaziovii - Rio de Janeiro, Minas Gerais
9. Actinostemon guyanensis - Guyana
10. Actinostemon imbricatus - NW Brazil
11. Actinostemon klotzschii - Brazil, Bolivia
12. Actinostemon lagoensis - S Brazil
13. Actinostemon lasiocarpus - E Brazil
14. Actinostemon leptopus - S Brazil
15. Actinostemon macrocarpus - S Brazil
16. Actinostemon mandiocanus - Rio de Janeiro
17. Actinostemon schomburgkii - Venezuela, 3 Guianas, N Brazil, Bolivia
18. Actinostemon sparsifolius - S Brazil
19. Actinostemon verticillatus - E Brazil

formerly included

moved to other genera: Gymnanthes Sebastiania

1. A. anisandrus - Sebastiania brasiliensis
2. A. brasiliensis - Sebastiania brasiliensis
3. A. jamaicensis - Gymnanthes glandulosa
4. A. luquensis - Sebastiania brasiliensis
5. A. unciformis - Sebastiania klotzschiana
