= Sebastiania obtusifolia =

Scientific classification
- Kingdom: Plantae
- Clade: Tracheophytes
- Clade: Angiosperms
- Clade: Eudicots
- Clade: Rosids
- Order: Malpighiales
- Family: Euphorbiaceae
- Genus: Sebastiania
- Species: S. obtusifolia

Binomial name
- Sebastiania obtusifolia Pax & K.Hoffm.

Synonyms
- Excoecaria obtusifolia (Kunth) Müll.Arg.; Sapium obtusifolium Kunth; Sapium peruvianum Steud.

Species of plant

Sebastiania obtusifolia is a species of flowering plant in the family Euphorbiaceae. It was described in 1912. It is native to Peru.
