= Sebastiania pubescens =

Scientific classification
- Kingdom: Plantae
- Clade: Tracheophytes
- Clade: Angiosperms
- Clade: Eudicots
- Clade: Rosids
- Order: Malpighiales
- Family: Euphorbiaceae
- Genus: Sebastiania
- Species: S. pubescens

Binomial name
- Sebastiania pubescens Pax & K.Hoffm.

Species of flowering plant

Sebastiania pubescens is a species of flowering plant in the family Euphorbiaceae. It is native to Minas Gerais, Brazil.

== History ==
It was described in 1912.
