= Sebastiania gracilis =

Scientific classification
- Kingdom: Plantae
- Clade: Tracheophytes
- Clade: Angiosperms
- Clade: Eudicots
- Clade: Rosids
- Order: Malpighiales
- Family: Euphorbiaceae
- Genus: Sebastiania
- Species: S. gracilis

Binomial name
- Sebastiania gracilis Pax & K.Hoffm.

Species of flowering plant

Sebastiania gracilis is a species of flowering plant in the family Euphorbiaceae. It was described in 1924. It is native to Rio de Janeiro, Brazil.
