= Crabwood =

Crabwood is a common name for multiple plants and may refer to:

- Carapa, native to the Caribbean, Central America, and South America
- Gymnanthes lucida, native to Florida, the Caribbean, and Central America
