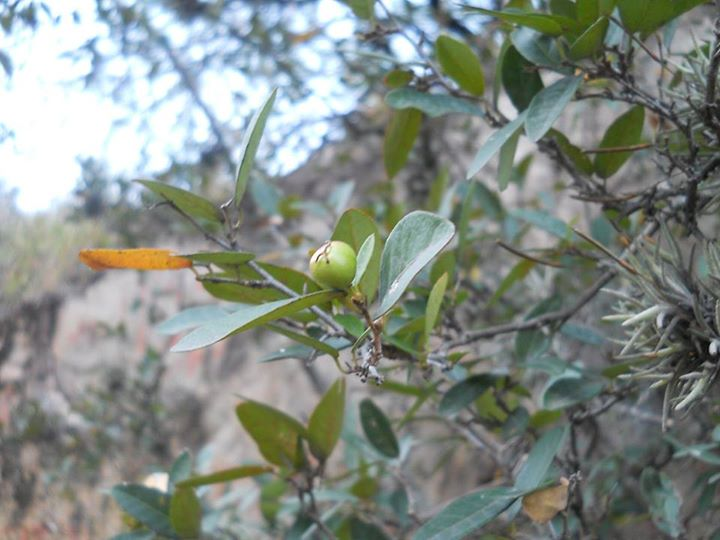
- Sebastiania commersoniana

Scientific classification
- Kingdom: Plantae
- Clade: Tracheophytes
- Clade: Angiosperms
- Clade: Eudicots
- Clade: Rosids
- Order: Malpighiales
- Family: Euphorbiaceae
- Subfamily: Euphorbioideae
- Tribe: Hippomaneae
- Subtribe: Hippomaninae
- Genus: Sebastiania; Spreng.

Synonyms
- Adenogyne Klotzsch; Clonostachys Klotzsch

= Sebastiania =

Genus of flowering plants

Sebastiania is a genus of flowering plants in the family Euphorbiaceae first described in 1821. It is native to North and South America from Arizona and the West Indies south to Uruguay.

== Species ==
As of 2020 Kew's Plants of the World Online accepts 60 species in the genus Sebastiania. Many species formerly included in this genus are now placed in genera such as Actinostemon, Bonania, Chrysanthellum, Dendrocousinsia, Ditaxis, Ditrysinia, Gymnanthes, Microstachys, Phyllanthus, Sapium, and Stillingia.

- Sebastiania argutidens Pax & K.Hoffm.
- Sebastiania bahiensis (Müll.Arg.) Müll.Arg.
- Sebastiania bicalcarata (Müll.Arg.) Pax
- Sebastiania brasiliensis Spreng.
- Sebastiania brevifolia (Müll.Arg.) Müll.Arg.
- Sebastiania catingae Ule
- Sebastiania chaetodonta Müll.Arg.
- Sebastiania chahalana Lundell
- Sebastiania chiapensis Lundell
- Sebastiania cruenta (Standl. & Steyerm.) Miranda
- Sebastiania daphniphylla (Baill.) Müll.Arg.
- Sebastiania dimorphocalyx Müll.Arg.
- Sebastiania echinocarpa Müll.Arg.
- Sebastiania eglandulata (Vell.) Pax
- Sebastiania glabrescens Pax & K.Hoffm.
- Sebastiania glandulosa (Sw.) Müll.Arg.
- Sebastiania gracilis Pax & K.Hoffm.
- Sebastiania haploclada Briq.
- Sebastiania heteroica Müll.Arg.
- Sebastiania hexaptera Urb.
- Sebastiania hintonii Lundell
- Sebastiania integra (Fawc. & Rendle) A.L.Melo & M.F.Sales
- Sebastiania jacobinensis (Müll.Arg.) Müll.Arg.
- Sebastiania jaliscensis McVaugh
- Sebastiania klotzschiana (Müll.Arg.) Müll.Arg.
- Sebastiania larensis Croizat & Tamayo
- Sebastiania laureola (Baill.) Müll.Arg.
- Sebastiania leptopoda Lundell
- Sebastiania longispicata Pax & K.Hoffm.
- Sebastiania macrocarpa Müll.Arg.
- Sebastiania mosenii Pax & K.Hoffm.
- Sebastiania obtusifolia Pax & K.Hoffm.
- Sebastiania pachyphylla Pax & K.Hoffm.
- Sebastiania pachystachya (Klotzsch) Müll.Arg.
- Sebastiania panamensis G.L.Webster
- Sebastiania pavoniana (Müll.Arg.) Müll.Arg.
- Sebastiania picardae Urb.
- Sebastiania potamophila (Müll.Arg.) Pax
- Sebastiania pteroclada (Müll.Arg.) Müll.Arg.
- Sebastiania pubescens Pax & K.Hoffm.
- Sebastiania pubiflora Lundell
- Sebastiania pusilla Croizat
- Sebastiania ramulosa Pax & K.Hoffm.
- Sebastiania rhombifolia Müll.Arg.
- Sebastiania riedelii Müll.Arg.
- Sebastiania rigida (Müll.Arg.) Müll.Arg.
- Sebastiania riparia Schrad.
- Sebastiania rotundifolia Pax & K.Hoffm.
- Sebastiania rupicola Pax & K.Hoffm.
- Sebastiania schottiana (Müll.Arg.) Müll.Arg.
- Sebastiania serrata (Baill. ex Müll.Arg.) Müll.Arg.
- Sebastiania subsessilis (Müll.Arg.) Pax
- Sebastiania subulata (Müll.Arg.) Pax
- Sebastiania trichogyne Pax & K.Hoffm.
- Sebastiania trinervia (Müll.Arg.) Müll.Arg.
- Sebastiania venezolana Pax & K.Hoffm.
- Sebastiania vestita Müll.Arg.
- Sebastiania warmingii (Müll.Arg.) Pax
- Sebastiania weddelliana (Baill.) Müll.Arg.
- Sebastiania ypanemensis (Müll.Arg.) Müll.Arg.
