= Sebastiania venezolana =

Conservation status
- Vulnerable (IUCN 3.1)

Scientific classification
- Kingdom: Plantae
- Clade: Tracheophytes
- Clade: Angiosperms
- Clade: Eudicots
- Clade: Rosids
- Order: Malpighiales
- Family: Euphorbiaceae
- Genus: Sebastiania
- Species: S. venezolana

Binomial name
- Sebastiania venezolana Pax & K.Hoffm.

Species of flowering plant

Sebastiania venezolana is a species of flowering plant in the family Euphorbiaceae. It was described in 1924. It is native to Venezuela.
