= Stillingia tenella =

Conservation status
- Least Concern (IUCN 3.1)

Scientific classification
- Kingdom: Plantae
- Clade: Tracheophytes
- Clade: Angiosperms
- Clade: Eudicots
- Clade: Rosids
- Order: Malpighiales
- Family: Euphorbiaceae
- Genus: Stillingia
- Species: S. tenella

Binomial name
- Stillingia tenella (Pax & K.Hoffm.) Esser

Synonyms
- Sapium tenellum Pax & K.Hoffm.; Stillingia yungasensis Belgrano & Pozner

Species of flowering plant

Stillingia tenella is a species of flowering plant in the spurge family, Euphorbiaceae. It was originally described as Sapium tenellum Pax & K.Hoffm. in 1924. It is native to Bolivia and northwest Argentina.
