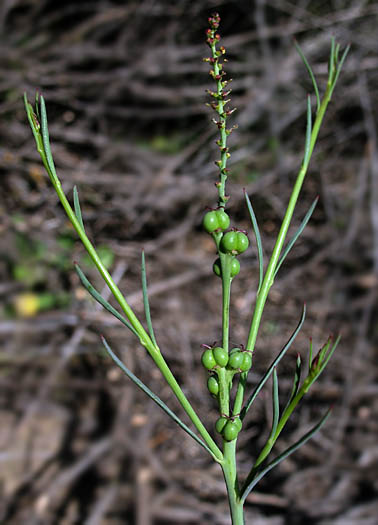

Scientific classification
- Kingdom: Plantae
- Clade: Tracheophytes
- Clade: Angiosperms
- Clade: Eudicots
- Clade: Rosids
- Order: Malpighiales
- Family: Euphorbiaceae
- Genus: Stillingia
- Species: S. linearifolia

Binomial name
- Stillingia linearifolia S.Watson

= Stillingia linearifolia =

Species of flowering plant

Stillingia linearifolia is a species of flowering plant in the euphorb family known as queen's-root.

It is native to the Southwestern United States, Southern California, and Northwestern Mexico, where it occurs in several types of dry and disturbed habitat in deserts, mountains, foothills, and chaparral.

== Description ==
Stillingia linearifolia is a perennial herb producing a clump of slender, branching, erect stems approaching 70 centimeters in height. The alternately arranged leaves are linear and narrow, reaching 4 centimeters in length but less than 2 millimeters in width.

The inflorescence is an erect spike of flowers a few centimeters long. The plant is monoecious, and each spike has several male flowers at the tip and a few fruit-bearing female flowers below these. Neither type of flower has petals. The ovary of the female flower develops into a three-lobed greenish capsule 3 to 4 millimeters wide.

There is a tiny black seed in each of the three chambers of the fruit.

== See also ==
- Flora of the California desert regions
- Natural history of the California chaparral and woodlands
