= Stillingia terminalis =

Scientific classification
- Kingdom: Plantae
- Clade: Tracheophytes
- Clade: Angiosperms
- Clade: Eudicots
- Clade: Rosids
- Order: Malpighiales
- Family: Euphorbiaceae
- Genus: Stillingia
- Species: S. terminalis

Binomial name
- Stillingia terminalis Baill.

Synonyms
- Sapium terminale (Baill.) Müll.Arg.

Species of flowering plant

Stillingia terminalis is a species of flowering plant in the family Euphorbiaceae. It was described in 1861. It is native to Madagascar.
