= Sebastiania integra =

Scientific classification
- Kingdom: Plantae
- Clade: Tracheophytes
- Clade: Angiosperms
- Clade: Eudicots
- Clade: Rosids
- Order: Malpighiales
- Family: Euphorbiaceae
- Genus: Sebastiania
- Species: S. integra

Binomial name
- Sebastiania integra (Fawc. & Rendle) A.L.Melo & M.F.Sales

Species of flowering plant

Sebastiania integra is a species of flowering plant in the family Euphorbiaceae. It was originally described as Gymnanthes integra Fawc. & Rendle in 1920. It is native to Jamaica.
