= Stillingia argutedentata =

Scientific classification
- Kingdom: Plantae
- Clade: Tracheophytes
- Clade: Angiosperms
- Clade: Eudicots
- Clade: Rosids
- Order: Malpighiales
- Family: Euphorbiaceae
- Genus: Stillingia
- Species: S. argutedentata

Binomial name
- Stillingia argutedentata Jabl.

Species of flowering plant

Stillingia argutedentata is a species of flowering plant in the family Euphorbiaceae. It was described by Eugene Jablonszky in 1967. It is native to Minas Gerais, Brazil.
