= Doa translucida =

Scientific classification
- Domain: Eukaryota
- Kingdom: Animalia
- Phylum: Arthropoda
- Class: Insecta
- Order: Lepidoptera
- Superfamily: Drepanoidea
- Family: Doidae
- Genus: Doa
- Species: D. translucida

Binomial name
- Doa translucida Dognin, 1910

Species of moth

Doa translucida is a moth in the Doidae family. It was described by Paul Dognin in 1910. It is found in Colombia.
