= Stillingia uleana =

Scientific classification
- Kingdom: Plantae
- Clade: Tracheophytes
- Clade: Angiosperms
- Clade: Eudicots
- Clade: Rosids
- Order: Malpighiales
- Family: Euphorbiaceae
- Genus: Stillingia
- Species: S. uleana

Binomial name
- Stillingia uleana Pax & K.Hoffm.

Species of flowering plant

Stillingia uleana is a species of flowering plant in the family Euphorbiaceae. It was described in 1912. It is native to Brazil, in Bahia and Minas Gerais.
