= Sebastiania dimorphocalyx =

Scientific classification
- Kingdom: Plantae
- Clade: Tracheophytes
- Clade: Angiosperms
- Clade: Eudicots
- Clade: Rosids
- Order: Malpighiales
- Family: Euphorbiaceae
- Genus: Sebastiania
- Species: S. dimorphocalyx

Binomial name
- Sebastiania dimorphocalyx Müll.Arg.

- Distribution of Sebastiania dimorphocalyx in Minas Gerais, Brazil

Species of flowering plant

Sebastiania dimorphocalyx is a species of flowering plant in the family Euphorbiaceae. It was described in 1874. It is native to Minas Gerais, Brazil.

== Description ==
It is a shrub, or a tree.

== Ecology ==
Sebastiania dimorphocalyx primarily grows in the seasonally dry tropical biome of Brazil.

== Conservation ==
Only two occurrences of this species have been documented.
