= Sebastiania rhombifolia =

Scientific classification
- Kingdom: Plantae
- Clade: Tracheophytes
- Clade: Angiosperms
- Clade: Eudicots
- Clade: Rosids
- Order: Malpighiales
- Family: Euphorbiaceae
- Genus: Sebastiania
- Species: S. rhombifolia

Binomial name
- Sebastiania rhombifolia Müll.Arg.

Species of flowering plant

Sebastiania rhombifolia is a species of flowering plant in the family Euphorbiaceae. It was described in 1874. It is native to Minas Gerais, Brazil.
