= Sebastiania subsessilis =

Scientific classification
- Kingdom: Plantae
- Clade: Tracheophytes
- Clade: Angiosperms
- Clade: Eudicots
- Clade: Rosids
- Order: Malpighiales
- Family: Euphorbiaceae
- Genus: Sebastiania
- Species: S. subsessilis

Binomial name
- Sebastiania subsessilis (Müll.Arg.) Pax

Species of flowering plant

Sebastiania subsessilis is a species of flowering plant in the family Euphorbiaceae. It was originally described as Excoecaria subsessilis Müll.Arg. in 1866. It is native from southern Brazil to Paraguay.
