= Stillingia sanguinolenta =

Scientific classification
- Kingdom: Plantae
- Clade: Tracheophytes
- Clade: Angiosperms
- Clade: Eudicots
- Clade: Rosids
- Order: Malpighiales
- Family: Euphorbiaceae
- Genus: Stillingia
- Species: S. sanguinolenta

Binomial name
- Stillingia sanguinolenta Müll.Arg.

Synonyms
- Sapium angulatum Klotzsch ex Pax; Stillingia sanguinolenta var. angustifolia Müll.Arg.; Stillingia sanguinolenta var. lanceolata Müll.Arg.

Species of flowering plant

Stillingia sanguinolenta is a species of flowering plant in the family Euphorbiaceae. It was described in 1863 by Johannes Müller Argoviensis. It is native to Mexico and Honduras.
