= Stillingia aquatica =

Scientific classification
- Kingdom: Plantae
- Clade: Tracheophytes
- Clade: Angiosperms
- Clade: Eudicots
- Clade: Rosids
- Order: Malpighiales
- Family: Euphorbiaceae
- Genus: Stillingia
- Species: S. aquatica

Binomial name
- Stillingia aquatica Chapm.

Species of shrub

Stillingia aquatica, known as water toothleaf and corkwood, is a flowering shrub in the genus Stillingia that grows in the Southeastern United States in parts of Georgia, Florida, Alabama, and South Carolina. It is in the spurge family, Euphorbiaceae. Stillingia aquatica was described by Alvan Wentworth Chapman in 1860.
