= Stillingia diphtherina =

Scientific classification
- Kingdom: Plantae
- Clade: Tracheophytes
- Clade: Angiosperms
- Clade: Eudicots
- Clade: Rosids
- Order: Malpighiales
- Family: Euphorbiaceae
- Genus: Stillingia
- Species: S. diphtherina

Binomial name
- Stillingia diphtherina D.J.Rogers

Species of flowering plant

Stillingia diphtherina is a species of flowering plant in the family Euphorbiaceae. It was described in 1951. It is native to southern Mexico, Guatemala, and Honduras.
