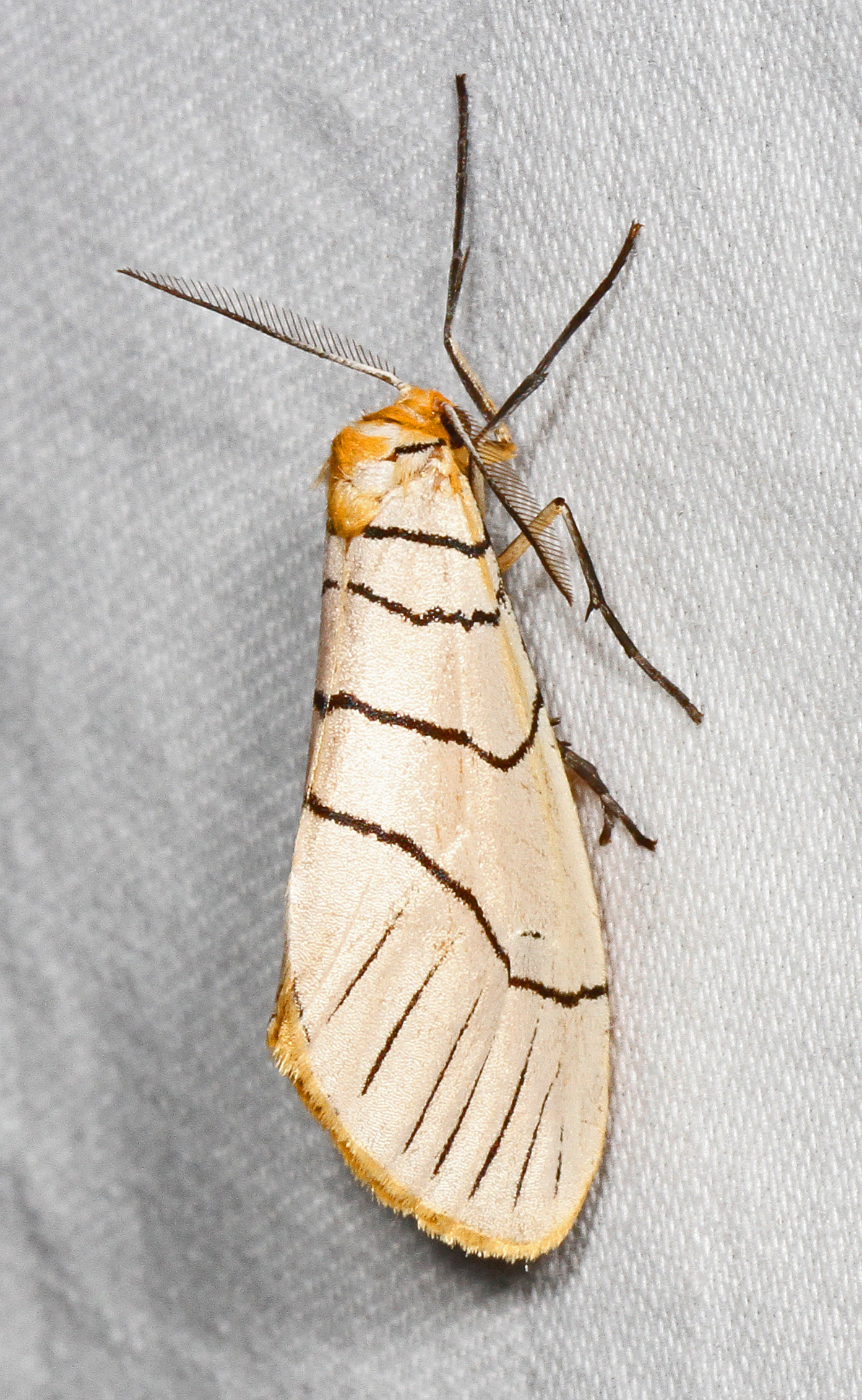

Scientific classification
- Domain: Eukaryota
- Kingdom: Animalia
- Phylum: Arthropoda
- Class: Insecta
- Order: Lepidoptera
- Superfamily: Drepanoidea
- Family: Doidae
- Genus: Doa
- Species: D. raspa

Binomial name
- Doa raspa Druce, 1894

Synonyms
- Leuculodes raspa (Druce, 1894)

= Doa raspa =

Species of moth

Doa raspa is a species of moth in the family Doidae. It is found in Central America, including Belize.
