= Stillingia dichotoma =

Scientific classification
- Kingdom: Plantae
- Clade: Tracheophytes
- Clade: Angiosperms
- Clade: Eudicots
- Clade: Rosids
- Order: Malpighiales
- Family: Euphorbiaceae
- Genus: Stillingia
- Species: S. dichotoma

Binomial name
- Stillingia dichotoma Müll.Arg.

Species of flowering plant

Stillingia dichotoma is a species of flowering plant in the family Euphorbiaceae. It was described by Johannes Müller Argoviensis in 1863. It is native to Bahia and Rio de Janeiro, Brazil.
