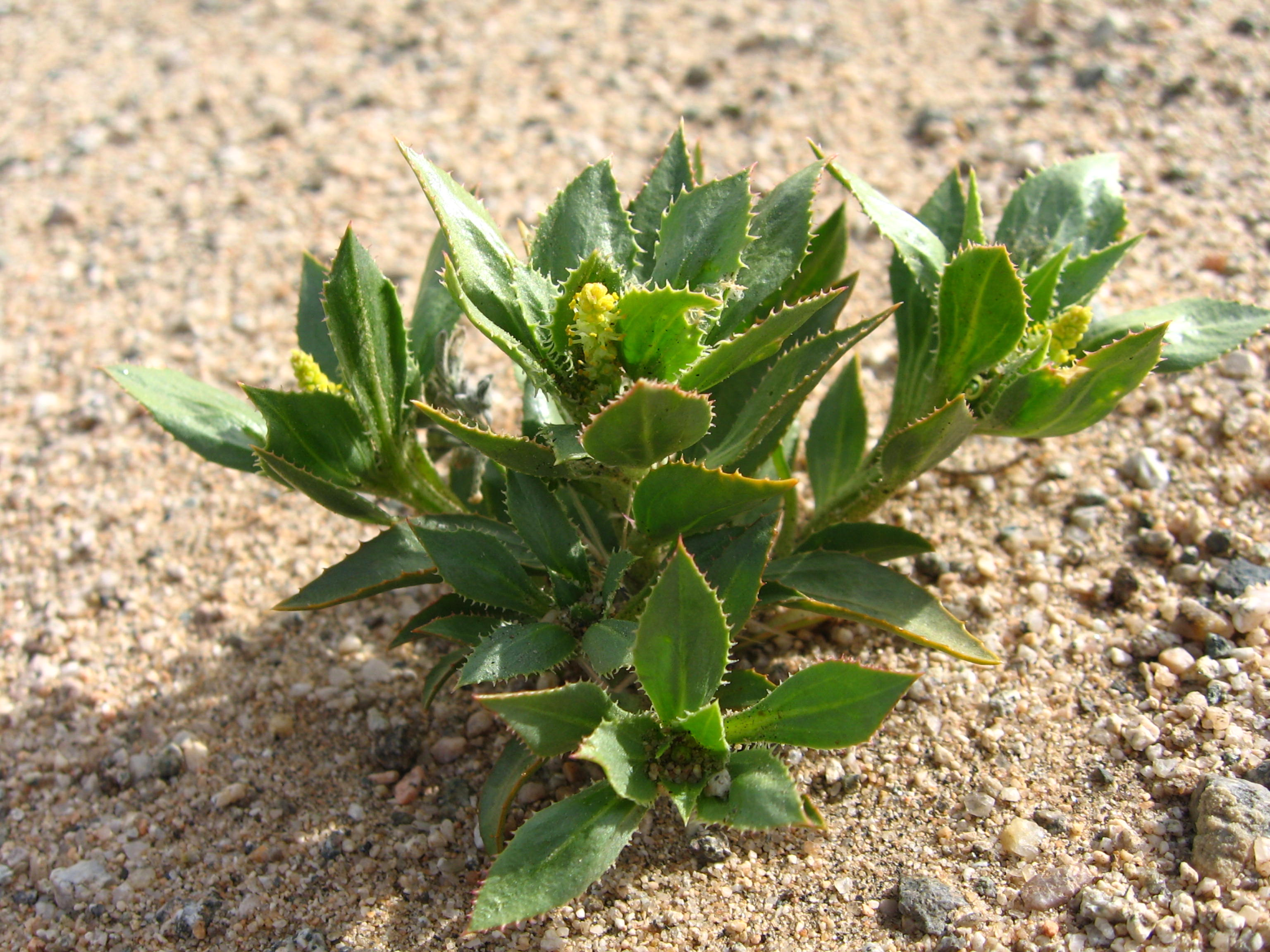

Scientific classification
- Kingdom: Plantae
- Clade: Tracheophytes
- Clade: Angiosperms
- Clade: Eudicots
- Clade: Rosids
- Order: Malpighiales
- Family: Euphorbiaceae
- Genus: Stillingia
- Species: S. spinulosa

Binomial name
- Stillingia spinulosa Torr.

= Stillingia spinulosa =

Species of flowering plant

Stillingia spinulosa is a species of flowering plant in the euphorb family known by the common name annual toothleaf. It is native to the Southwestern United States where it occurs in the creosote scrub of the deserts. It is an annual or perennial herb producing a clump of thick, leafy stems approaching a meter in maximum height. The alternately arranged leaves have shiny pointed oval blades 2 to 4 centimeters long and up to 1.2 centimeters wide which are lined with sharp teeth. The inflorescence is a stout spike of flowers 1 to 2 centimeters long. The plant is monoecious, and each spike has several male flowers at the tip and 1 or 2 fruit-bearing female flowers below these. Neither type of flower has petals. The ovary of the female flower develops into a three-lobed greenish capsule about half a centimeter wide. There is a tiny rough-surfaced seed in each of the three chambers of the fruit.
