= Leuculodes lephassa =

Scientific classification
- Domain: Eukaryota
- Kingdom: Animalia
- Phylum: Arthropoda
- Class: Insecta
- Order: Lepidoptera
- Family: Doidae
- Genus: Leuculodes
- Species: L. lephassa

Binomial name
- Leuculodes lephassa (Druce, 1897)

Synonyms
- Cycnia lephassa Druce, 1897; Leucula dianaria Dyar, 1914

Species of moth

Leuculodes lephassa is a moth in the Doidae family. It was described by Druce in 1897. It is found in Mexico.
