= Sebastiania panamensis =

Scientific classification
- Kingdom: Plantae
- Clade: Tracheophytes
- Clade: Angiosperms
- Clade: Eudicots
- Clade: Rosids
- Order: Malpighiales
- Family: Euphorbiaceae
- Genus: Sebastiania
- Species: S. panamensis

Binomial name
- Sebastiania panamensis G.L.Webster

Species of flowering plant

Sebastiania panamensis is a species of flowering plant in the family Euphorbiaceae. It was described in 1988. It is native from Costa Rica to western Panama.
