= Stillingia trapezoidea =

Scientific classification
- Kingdom: Plantae
- Clade: Tracheophytes
- Clade: Angiosperms
- Clade: Eudicots
- Clade: Rosids
- Order: Malpighiales
- Family: Euphorbiaceae
- Genus: Stillingia
- Species: S. trapezoidea

Binomial name
- Stillingia trapezoidea Ule

Species of flowering plant

Stillingia trapezoidea is a species of flowering plant in the family Euphorbiaceae. It was described in 1908. It is native to northeastern Brazil.
