= Stillingia peruviana =

Scientific classification
- Kingdom: Plantae
- Clade: Tracheophytes
- Clade: Angiosperms
- Clade: Eudicots
- Clade: Rosids
- Order: Malpighiales
- Family: Euphorbiaceae
- Genus: Stillingia
- Species: S. peruviana

Binomial name
- Stillingia peruviana D.J.Rogers

Species of plant

Stillingia peruviana is a species of flowering plant in the family Euphorbiaceae. It was described in 1951. It is native to Peru.
