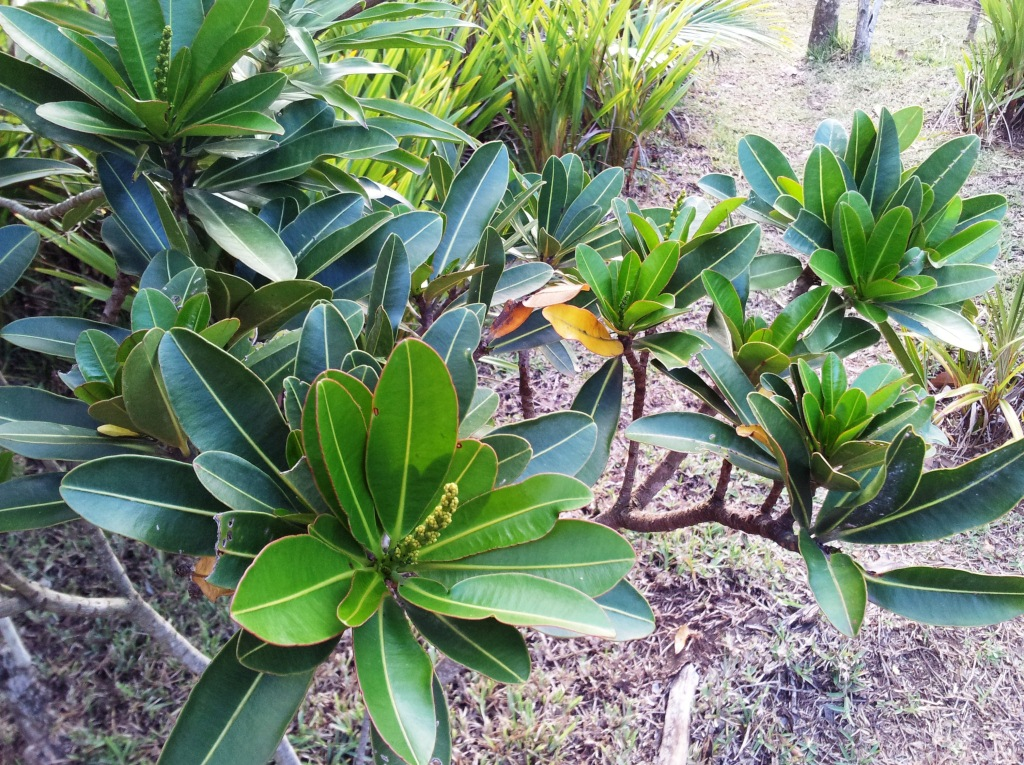

Scientific classification
- Kingdom: Plantae
- Clade: Tracheophytes
- Clade: Angiosperms
- Clade: Eudicots
- Clade: Rosids
- Order: Malpighiales
- Family: Euphorbiaceae
- Genus: Stillingia
- Species: S. lineata

Binomial name
- Stillingia lineata (Lam.) Müll.Arg.

Synonyms
- Sapium lineatum Lam.

= Stillingia lineata =

Species of flowering plant

Stillingia lineata is a species of flowering plant in the family Euphorbiaceae, native to Réunion, Mauritius, the South China Sea, Malesia and Fiji.

It was originally described by Jean-Baptiste Lamarck as Sapium lineatum in 1788 and moved to the genus Stillingia in 1866.
