= Leuculodes lacteolaria =

Scientific classification
- Kingdom: Animalia
- Phylum: Arthropoda
- Class: Insecta
- Order: Lepidoptera
- Family: Doidae
- Genus: Leuculodes
- Species: L. lacteolaria

Binomial name
- Leuculodes lacteolaria Hulst, 1896

Synonyms
- Leuculodes lacteolata (Hulst, 1896)

Species of moth

Leuculodes lacteolaria is a moth of the Doidae family. It is found in neotropical Central America, north to Arizona.
