= Sebastiania hexaptera =

Scientific classification
- Kingdom: Plantae
- Clade: Tracheophytes
- Clade: Angiosperms
- Clade: Eudicots
- Clade: Rosids
- Order: Malpighiales
- Family: Euphorbiaceae
- Genus: Sebastiania
- Species: S. hexaptera

Binomial name
- Sebastiania hexaptera Urb.

Species of flowering plant

Sebastiania hexaptera is a species of flowering plant in the family Euphorbiaceae. It was described in 1902. It is native to Guadeloupe, Dominica, and Martinique.
