= Stillingia oppositifolia =

Scientific classification
- Kingdom: Plantae
- Clade: Tracheophytes
- Clade: Angiosperms
- Clade: Eudicots
- Clade: Rosids
- Order: Malpighiales
- Family: Euphorbiaceae
- Genus: Stillingia
- Species: S. oppositifolia

Binomial name
- Stillingia oppositifolia Baill. ex Müll.Arg.

Synonyms
- Sapium oppositifolium Klotzsch ex Baill.; Sapium sanguinolentum Klotzsch ex Pax

Species of flowering plant

Stillingia oppositifolia is a species of flowering plant in the family Euphorbiaceae. It was described in 1866. It is native to Brazil.
