= Sebastiania rupicola =

Scientific classification
- Kingdom: Plantae
- Clade: Tracheophytes
- Clade: Angiosperms
- Clade: Eudicots
- Clade: Rosids
- Order: Malpighiales
- Family: Euphorbiaceae
- Genus: Sebastiania
- Species: S. rupicola

Binomial name
- Sebastiania rupicola Pax & K.Hoffm.

Species of flowering plant

Sebastiania rupicola is a species of flowering plant in the family Euphorbiaceae. It was described in 1912. It is native to Rio de Janeiro, Brazil.
