= Stillingia acutifolia =

Scientific classification
- Kingdom: Plantae
- Clade: Tracheophytes
- Clade: Angiosperms
- Clade: Eudicots
- Clade: Rosids
- Order: Malpighiales
- Family: Euphorbiaceae
- Genus: Stillingia
- Species: S. acutifolia

Binomial name
- Stillingia acutifolia (Benth.) Benth. & Hook.f. ex Hemsl.

Species of flowering plant

Stillingia acutifolia is a species of flowering plant in the family Euphorbiaceae. It was originally described by George Bentham as Sapium acutifolium in 1842. Its native range includes Mexico, Guatemala, and Honduras.
