= Gymnanthes integra =

Conservation status
- Near Threatened (IUCN 2.3)

Scientific classification
- Kingdom: Plantae
- Clade: Tracheophytes
- Clade: Angiosperms
- Clade: Eudicots
- Clade: Rosids
- Order: Malpighiales
- Family: Euphorbiaceae
- Genus: Gymnanthes
- Species: G. integra

Binomial name
- Gymnanthes integra Fawc. & Rendle

Synonyms
- Ateramnus integer (F. & R.) Rothm.

Species of flowering plant

Gymnanthes integra is a species of plant belonging to the family Euphorbiaceae. It is endemic to Jamaica. It is threatened by habitat loss.
