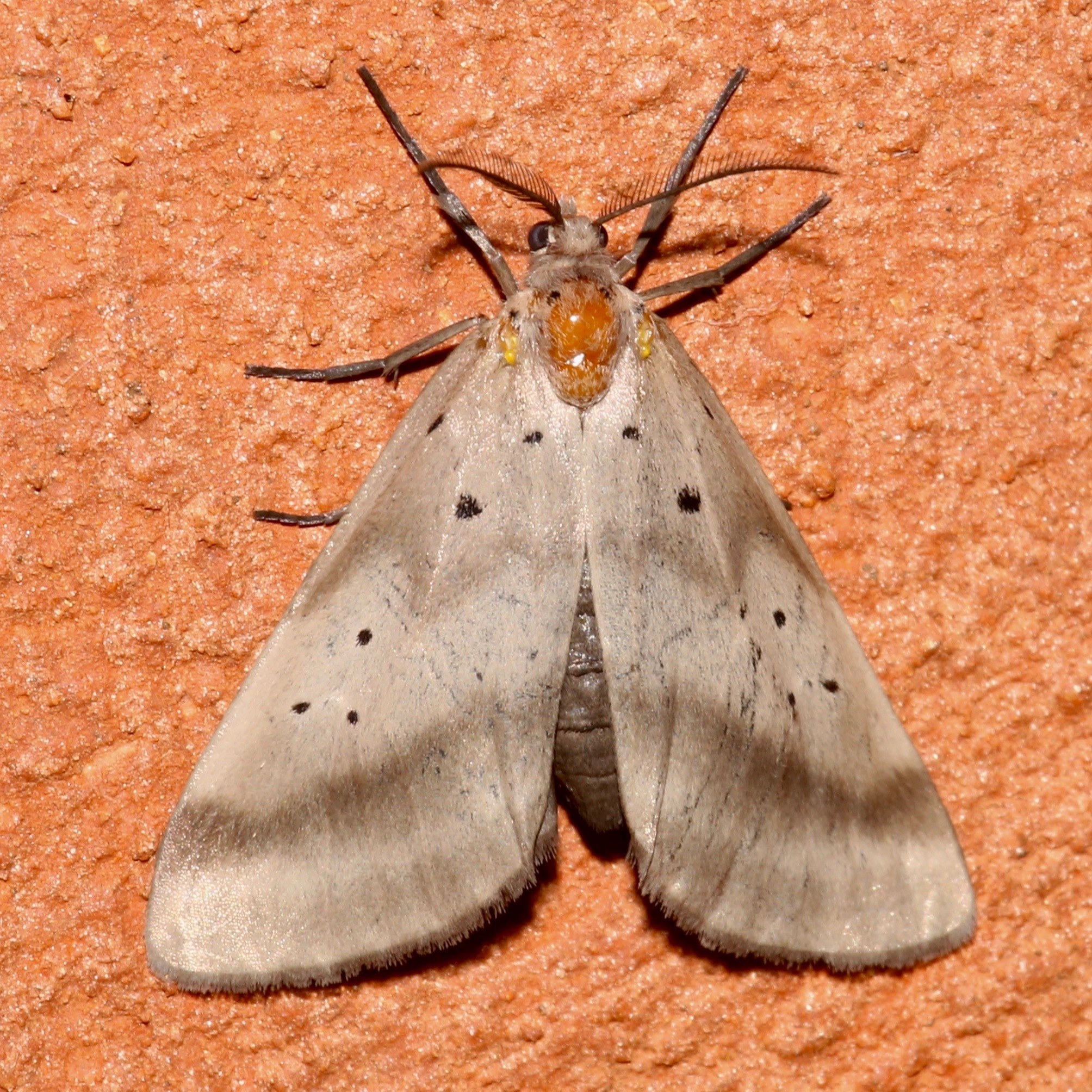
- Doa dora

Scientific classification
- Kingdom: Animalia
- Phylum: Arthropoda
- Class: Insecta
- Order: Lepidoptera
- Superfamily: Drepanoidea
- Family: Doidae
- Genus: Doa; Neumoegen & Dyar, 1894

= Doa (moth) =

Genus of moths

Doa is a genus of moths of the Doidae family.

== Species ==
- Doa ampla (Grote, 1878)
- Doa cubana Schaus, 1906
- Doa dora Neumoegen & Dyar, 1894
- Doa raspa Druce, 1894
- Doa translucida Dognin, 1910
