= Stillingia parvifolia =

Scientific classification
- Kingdom: Plantae
- Clade: Tracheophytes
- Clade: Angiosperms
- Clade: Eudicots
- Clade: Rosids
- Order: Malpighiales
- Family: Euphorbiaceae
- Genus: Stillingia
- Species: S. parvifolia

Binomial name
- Stillingia parvifolia Sánchez Vega, Sagást. & Huft

Species of plant

Stillingia parvifolia is a species of flowering plant in the family Euphorbiaceae. It was described in 1989. It is native to Peru.
