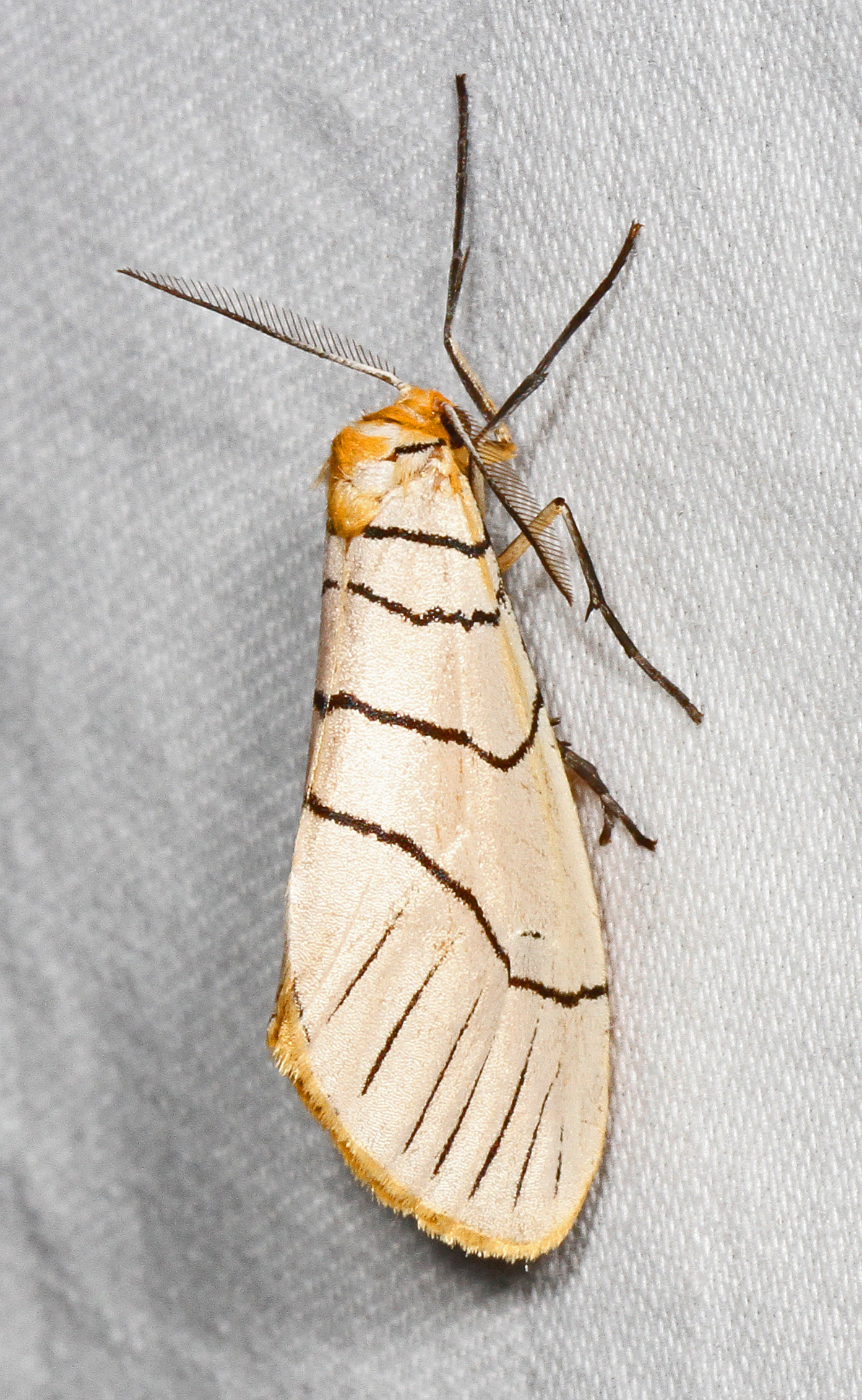
- Doa raspa

Scientific classification
- Kingdom: Animalia
- Phylum: Arthropoda
- Clade: Pancrustacea
- Class: Insecta
- Order: Lepidoptera
- Superfamily: Drepanoidea
- Family: Doidae; Donahue & Brown, 1987

Genera
- See text

= Doidae =

Family of moths

Doidae is a small family of Lepidoptera with an exclusively New World distribution, with species occurring in Central America, the south-western United States, and northern South America.

== Taxonomical placement ==
Doidae was elevated to family rank by Julian P. Donahue and John W. Brown in 1987. They have a complex taxonomical history, and have previously been placed in Geometridae, Arctiidae, Lymantriidae and Dioptidae among several other families. As a family, Doidae was formerly included in superfamily Noctuoidea, but was transferred to the Drepanoidea in 2011 by van Nieukerken et al.

== Genera and species ==
As of May 2024, the Global Biodiversity Information Facility lists seven species in two genera for Doidae:

- Genus Doa Neumoegen & Dyar, 1894 - type genus
  - Doa ampla (Grote, 1878) - South-western US, Mexico
  - Doa cubana Schaus, 1906 - Cuba
  - Doa dora Neumoegen & Dyar, 1894 - Mexico, California
  - Doa raspa Druce, 1894 - Mexico, Belize
  - Doa translucida Dognin, 1910 - Colombia
- Genus Leuculodes Dyar, 1903
  - Leuculodes lacteolaria Hulst, 1896
  - Leuculodes lephassa Druce, 1897
