= Sebastiania chiapensis =

Conservation status
- Endangered (IUCN 3.1)

Scientific classification
- Kingdom: Plantae
- Clade: Tracheophytes
- Clade: Angiosperms
- Clade: Eudicots
- Clade: Rosids
- Order: Malpighiales
- Family: Euphorbiaceae
- Genus: Sebastiania
- Species: S. chiapensis

Binomial name
- Sebastiania chiapensis Lundell

Species of flowering plant

Sebastiania chiapensis is a species of flowering plant in the family Euphorbiaceae. It was described in 1968. It is native to Chiapas, Mexico.
