= Sebastiania bicalcarata =

Scientific classification
- Kingdom: Plantae
- Clade: Tracheophytes
- Clade: Angiosperms
- Clade: Eudicots
- Clade: Rosids
- Order: Malpighiales
- Family: Euphorbiaceae
- Genus: Sebastiania
- Species: S. bicalcarata

Binomial name
- Sebastiania bicalcarata (Müll.Arg.) Pax

Species of flowering plant

Sebastiania bicalcarata is a species of flowering plant in the family Euphorbiaceae. It was originally described as Excoecaria bicalcarata Müll.Arg. in 1863. It is native to Goiás, Brazil.
