= Sebastiania haploclada =

Scientific classification
- Kingdom: Plantae
- Clade: Tracheophytes
- Clade: Angiosperms
- Clade: Eudicots
- Clade: Rosids
- Order: Malpighiales
- Family: Euphorbiaceae
- Genus: Sebastiania
- Species: S. haploclada

Binomial name
- Sebastiania haploclada Briq.

Species of plant

Sebastiania haploclada is a species of flowering plant in the family Euphorbiaceae. It was described in 1900. It is native to Peru.
