= Sebastiania catingae =

Scientific classification
- Kingdom: Plantae
- Clade: Tracheophytes
- Clade: Angiosperms
- Clade: Eudicots
- Clade: Rosids
- Order: Malpighiales
- Family: Euphorbiaceae
- Genus: Sebastiania
- Species: S. catingae

Binomial name
- Sebastiania catingae Ule

Species of flowering plant

Sebastiania catingae is a species of flowering plant in the family Euphorbiaceae. It was described in 1908. It is native to Bahia, Brazil.
