= Stillingia bicarpellaris =

Scientific classification
- Kingdom: Plantae
- Clade: Tracheophytes
- Clade: Angiosperms
- Clade: Eudicots
- Clade: Rosids
- Order: Malpighiales
- Family: Euphorbiaceae
- Genus: Stillingia
- Species: S. bicarpellaris

Binomial name
- Stillingia bicarpellaris S.Watson

Species of flowering plant

Stillingia bicarpellaris is a species of flowering plant in the family Euphorbiaceae. It was described by Sereno Watson in 1886. It is native to northeastern Mexico.
