= Stillingia querceticola =

Scientific classification
- Kingdom: Plantae
- Clade: Tracheophytes
- Clade: Angiosperms
- Clade: Eudicots
- Clade: Rosids
- Order: Malpighiales
- Family: Euphorbiaceae
- Genus: Stillingia
- Species: S. querceticola

Binomial name
- Stillingia querceticola McVaugh

Species of flowering plant

Stillingia querceticola is a species of flowering plant in the family Euphorbiaceae. It was described in 1995. It is native to southwestern Mexico.
