= Stillingia paucidentata =

Scientific classification
- Kingdom: Plantae
- Clade: Tracheophytes
- Clade: Angiosperms
- Clade: Eudicots
- Clade: Rosids
- Order: Malpighiales
- Family: Euphorbiaceae
- Genus: Stillingia
- Species: S. paucidentata

Binomial name
- Stillingia paucidentata S.Watson

Synonyms
- Stillingia linearifolia var. paucidentata (S.Watson) Jeps.

Species of flowering plant

Stillingia paucidentata, the Mojave toothleaf, is a species of flowering plant in the spurge family, Euphorbiaceae. The Mojave toothleaf is endemic to southeastern California in the United States. It may occur in nearby western Arizona, but no specimens from that state have been conclusively confirmed. It grows in sandy areas and dry slopes, flowering between March and May and fruiting in May and June.

It was described by Sereno Watson in 1879.
