= Leuculodes =

Scientific classification
- Kingdom: Animalia
- Phylum: Arthropoda
- Class: Insecta
- Order: Lepidoptera
- Family: Doidae
- Genus: Leuculodes; Dyar, 1903

Genus of moths

Leuculodes is a genus of moths of the family Doidae.

== Species ==
- Leuculodes lacteolaria Hulst, 1896
- Leuculodes lephassa Druce, 1897

== Former species ==
- Leuculodes dianaria Dyar, 1914
