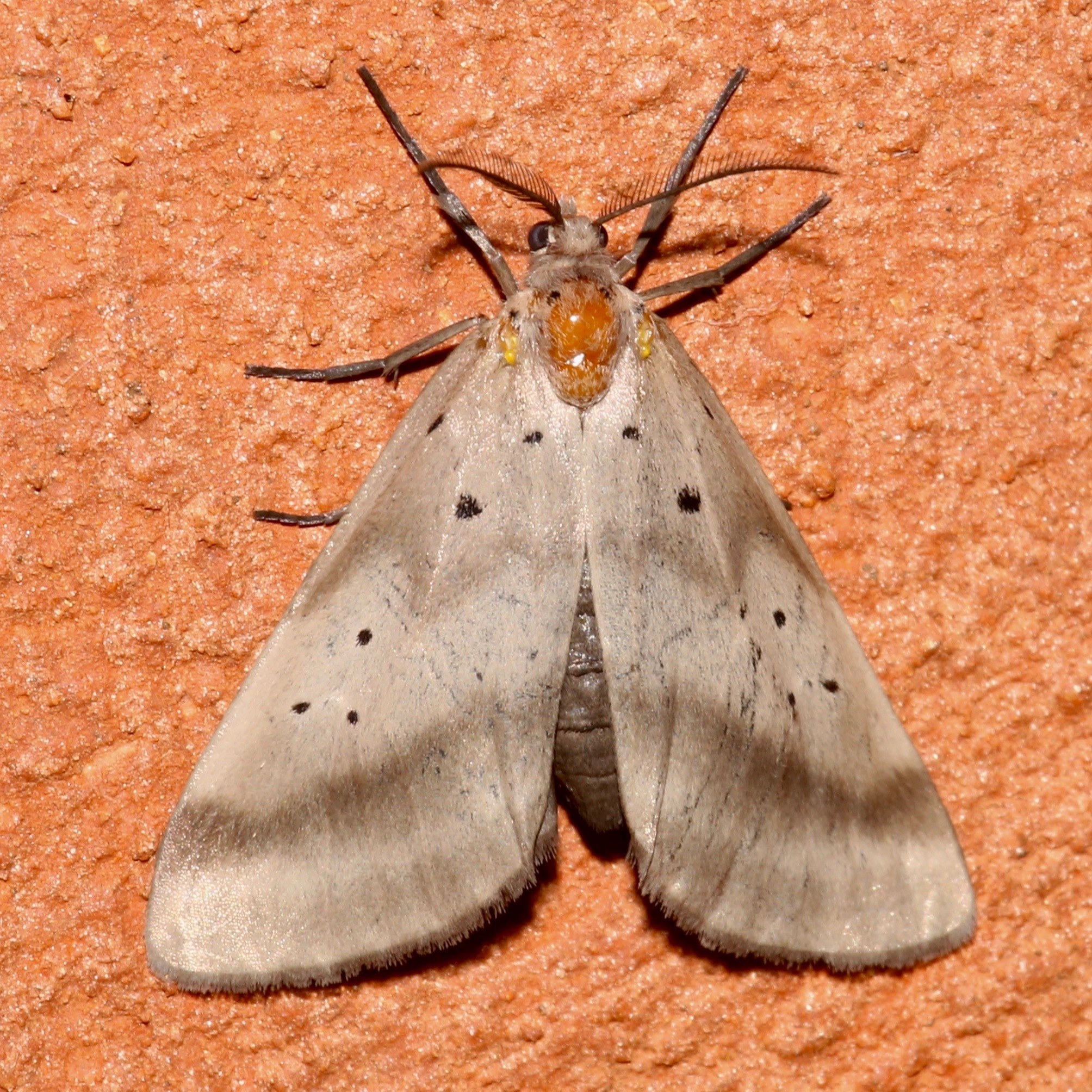

Scientific classification
- Kingdom: Animalia
- Phylum: Arthropoda
- Class: Insecta
- Order: Lepidoptera
- Superfamily: Drepanoidea
- Family: Doidae
- Genus: Doa
- Species: D. dora

Binomial name
- Doa dora Neumoegen & Dyar, 1894

= Doa dora =

Species of moth

Doa dora is a moth of the Doidae family. It is found in Mexico, including Baja California and Guadalajara.
