= Stillingia saxatilis =

Scientific classification
- Kingdom: Plantae
- Clade: Tracheophytes
- Clade: Angiosperms
- Clade: Eudicots
- Clade: Rosids
- Order: Malpighiales
- Family: Euphorbiaceae
- Genus: Stillingia
- Species: S. saxatilis

Binomial name
- Stillingia saxatilis Müll.Arg.

Species of flowering plant

Stillingia saxatilis is a species of flowering plant in the family Euphorbiaceae. It was described in 1874 by Johannes Müller Argoviensis. It is native to Brazil, in Bahia and Minas Gerais.
