= Sebastiania riparia =

Scientific classification
- Kingdom: Plantae
- Clade: Tracheophytes
- Clade: Angiosperms
- Clade: Eudicots
- Clade: Rosids
- Order: Malpighiales
- Family: Euphorbiaceae
- Genus: Sebastiania
- Species: S. riparia

Binomial name
- Sebastiania riparia Schrad.

Species of flowering plant

Sebastiania riparia is a species of flowering plant in the family Euphorbiaceae. It was described in 1821. It is native to Espírito Santo, Brazil.
