= Sebastiania warmingii =

Scientific classification
- Kingdom: Plantae
- Clade: Tracheophytes
- Clade: Angiosperms
- Clade: Eudicots
- Clade: Rosids
- Order: Malpighiales
- Family: Euphorbiaceae
- Genus: Sebastiania
- Species: S. warmingii

Binomial name
- Sebastiania warmingii (Müll.Arg.) Pax

Species of flowering plant

Sebastiania warmingii is a species of flowering plant in the family Euphorbiaceae. It was originally described as Excoecaria warmingii Müll.Arg. in 1874. It is native to Minas Gerais, Brazil.
