= Stillingia zelayensis =

Scientific classification
- Kingdom: Plantae
- Clade: Tracheophytes
- Clade: Angiosperms
- Clade: Eudicots
- Clade: Rosids
- Order: Malpighiales
- Family: Euphorbiaceae
- Genus: Stillingia
- Species: S. zelayensis

Binomial name
- Stillingia zelayensis (Kunth) Müll.Arg.

Species of flowering plant

Stillingia zelayensis is a species of flowering plant in the family Euphorbiaceae. It was originally described as Sapium zelayense Kunth in 1817. It is native to Central America.
