= Stillingia scutellifera =

Scientific classification
- Kingdom: Plantae
- Clade: Tracheophytes
- Clade: Angiosperms
- Clade: Eudicots
- Clade: Rosids
- Order: Malpighiales
- Family: Euphorbiaceae
- Genus: Stillingia
- Species: S. scutellifera

Binomial name
- Stillingia scutellifera D.J.Rogers

Species of flowering plant

Stillingia scutellifera is a species of flowering plant in the family Euphorbiaceae. It was described in 1951. It is native to Paraguay and Argentina.
