= Stillingia salpingadenia =

Scientific classification
- Kingdom: Plantae
- Clade: Tracheophytes
- Clade: Angiosperms
- Clade: Eudicots
- Clade: Rosids
- Order: Malpighiales
- Family: Euphorbiaceae
- Genus: Stillingia
- Species: S. salpingadenia

Binomial name
- Stillingia salpingadenia (Müll.Arg.) Huber

Synonyms
- Excoecaria salpingadenia (Huber) Müll.Arg.; Sapium cupuliferum Hemsl.; Sapium salpingadenium Müll.Arg.; Stillingia salpingadenia subsp. anadena Pax & K.Hoffm.; Stillingia salpingadenia var. cupulifera (Hemsl.) Pax; Stillingia salpingadenia var. salicina (Chodat & Hassl.) Pax

Species of flowering plant

Stillingia salpingadenia is a species of flowering plant in the family Euphorbiaceae. It is native to northeast Argentina, Bolivia, west-central Brazil, and Paraguay.

It was originally described by Johannes Müller Argoviensis as Sapium salpingadenia in 1863 and moved to the genus Stillingia by Jacques Huber in 1906.
