= Stillingia bodenbenderi =

Scientific classification
- Kingdom: Plantae
- Clade: Tracheophytes
- Clade: Angiosperms
- Clade: Eudicots
- Clade: Rosids
- Order: Malpighiales
- Family: Euphorbiaceae
- Genus: Stillingia
- Species: S. bodenbenderi

Binomial name
- Stillingia bodenbenderi (Kuntze) D.J.Rogers

Synonyms
- Excoecaria bodenbenderi (Kuntze) K.Schum.; Sapium bodenbenderi Kuntze; Sapium bolanderi Kuntze ex Pax; Sapium subsessile Hemsl.; Stillingia dusenii Pax & K.Hoffm.

Species of flowering plant

Stillingia bodenbenderi is a species of flowering plant in the family Euphorbiaceae. It was originally described by Otto Kuntze as Sapium bodenbenderi in 1898. It is native to southeastern Brazil and northeastern Argentina.
