= Sebastiania eglandulata =

Scientific classification
- Kingdom: Plantae
- Clade: Tracheophytes
- Clade: Angiosperms
- Clade: Eudicots
- Clade: Rosids
- Order: Malpighiales
- Family: Euphorbiaceae
- Genus: Sebastiania
- Species: S. eglandulata

Binomial name
- Sebastiania eglandulata (Vell.) Pax

Species of flowering plant

Sebastiania eglandulata is a species of flowering plant in the family Euphorbiaceae. It was originally described as Omphalea eglandulata Vell. in 1831. It is native to Rio de Janeiro, Brazil.
