= Sebastiania glandulosa =

Scientific classification
- Kingdom: Plantae
- Clade: Tracheophytes
- Clade: Angiosperms
- Clade: Eudicots
- Clade: Rosids
- Order: Malpighiales
- Family: Euphorbiaceae
- Genus: Sebastiania
- Species: S. glandulosa

Binomial name
- Sebastiania glandulosa (Sw.) Müll.Arg.

Species of flowering plant

Sebastiania glandulosa is a species of flowering plant in the family Euphorbiaceae. It was originally described as Excoecaria glandulosa Sw. in 1800. It is native to northcentral and southeast Mexico, Guatemala, Jamaica, and western Cuba.
