= Doa cubana =

Scientific classification
- Kingdom: Animalia
- Phylum: Arthropoda
- Class: Insecta
- Order: Lepidoptera
- Superfamily: Drepanoidea
- Family: Doidae
- Genus: Doa
- Species: D. cubana

Binomial name
- Doa cubana Schaus, 1906

Species of moth

Doa cubana is a moth of the Doidae family. It is found on Cuba.
