= Sebastiania pubiflora =

Scientific classification
- Kingdom: Plantae
- Clade: Tracheophytes
- Clade: Angiosperms
- Clade: Eudicots
- Clade: Rosids
- Order: Malpighiales
- Family: Euphorbiaceae
- Genus: Sebastiania
- Species: S. pubiflora

Binomial name
- Sebastiania pubiflora Lundell

Species of flowering plant

Sebastiania pubiflora is a species of flowering plant in the family Euphorbiaceae. It was described in 1975. It is native to Guatemala.
