= Sebastiania laureola =

Scientific classification
- Kingdom: Plantae
- Clade: Tracheophytes
- Clade: Angiosperms
- Clade: Eudicots
- Clade: Rosids
- Order: Malpighiales
- Family: Euphorbiaceae
- Genus: Sebastiania
- Species: S. laureola

Binomial name
- Sebastiania laureola (Baill.) Müll.Arg.

Synonyms
- Sarothrostachys laureola (Baill.) H.Buek; Stillingia laureola Baill.

Species of flowering plant

Sebastiania laureola is a species of flowering plant in the family Euphorbiaceae. It was originally described as Stillingia laureola Baill. in 1865. It is native to Rio de Janeiro, Brazil.
