= Gymnanthes glandulosa =

Conservation status
- Vulnerable (IUCN 2.3)

Scientific classification
- Kingdom: Plantae
- Clade: Embryophytes
- Clade: Tracheophytes
- Clade: Spermatophytes
- Clade: Angiosperms
- Clade: Eudicots
- Clade: Rosids
- Order: Malpighiales
- Family: Euphorbiaceae
- Genus: Gymnanthes
- Species: G. glandulosa

Binomial name
- Gymnanthes glandulosa (Sw.) Müll.Arg.

Synonyms
- Ateramnus glandulosus (Sw.) C.D.Adams

Species of flowering plant

Gymnanthes glandulosa is a species of plant in the family Euphorbiaceae. It is found in Cuba and Jamaica.
