= Sebastiania weddelliana =

Scientific classification
- Kingdom: Plantae
- Clade: Tracheophytes
- Clade: Angiosperms
- Clade: Eudicots
- Clade: Rosids
- Order: Malpighiales
- Family: Euphorbiaceae
- Genus: Sebastiania
- Species: S. weddelliana

Binomial name
- Sebastiania weddelliana (Baill.) Müll.Arg.

Synonyms
- Stillingia weddelliana Baill.

Species of flowering plant

Sebastiania weddelliana is a species of flowering plant in the family Euphorbiaceae. It was originally described as Stillingia weddelliana Baill. in 1865. It is native to Mato Grosso, Brazil.
