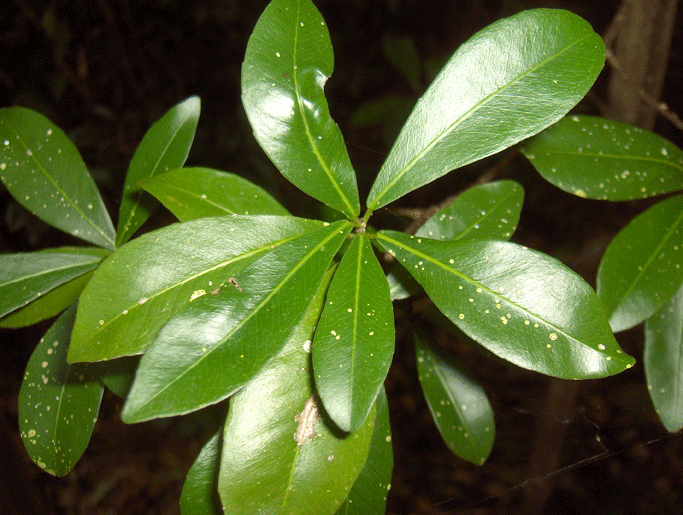

Conservation status
- Least Concern (IUCN 3.1)

Scientific classification
- Kingdom: Plantae
- Clade: Tracheophytes
- Clade: Angiosperms
- Clade: Eudicots
- Clade: Rosids
- Order: Malpighiales
- Family: Euphorbiaceae
- Genus: Gymnanthes
- Species: G. lucida

Binomial name
- Gymnanthes lucida Sw.

Synonyms
- Ateramnus lucidus (Sw.) Rothm.

= Gymnanthes lucida =

Species of tree

Gymnanthes lucida, commonly known as shiny oysterwood or crabwood, is a species of flowering plant in the spurge family, Euphorbiaceae, that is native to southern Florida in the United States, the Bahamas, the Caribbean, Mexico, and Central America.

== Description ==
It is a tree, reaching a height of 20 feet (6.1 m).
