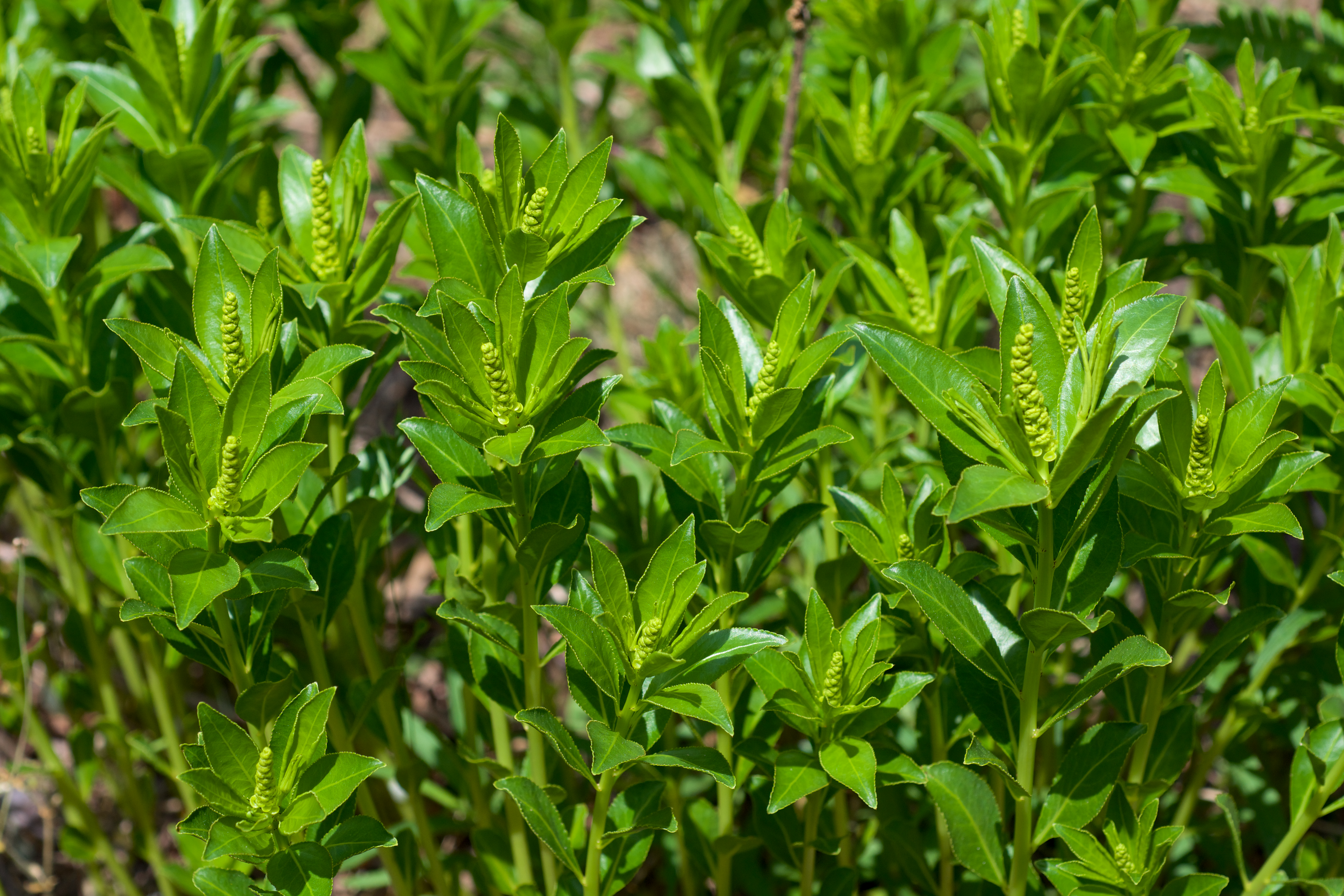

Conservation status
- Secure (NatureServe)

Scientific classification
- Kingdom: Plantae
- Clade: Tracheophytes
- Clade: Angiosperms
- Clade: Eudicots
- Clade: Rosids
- Order: Malpighiales
- Family: Euphorbiaceae
- Genus: Stillingia
- Species: S. sylvatica

Binomial name
- Stillingia sylvatica L.

= Stillingia sylvatica =

Species of flowering plant

Stillingia sylvatica, known as queen's-delight or queen's delight, is a species of flowering plant in the family Euphorbiaceae. It was described in 1767. It is endemic to the south-central and southeastern United States, growing in sandy areas such as sandhills and pine flatwoods.

It is an herb or subshrub averaging 25–70 cm (9.8–27.6 in) in height. It has alternate, ovate leaves with short petioles, reaching 10 cm (3.9 in) in length and 3 cm (1.2 in) in width. The leaf margins are serrulate to crenulate with incurved teeth. Each crowded inflorescence has four to seven staminate flowers and three to four pistillate flowers. Queen's delight flowers between March and June, fruiting from April to September.
