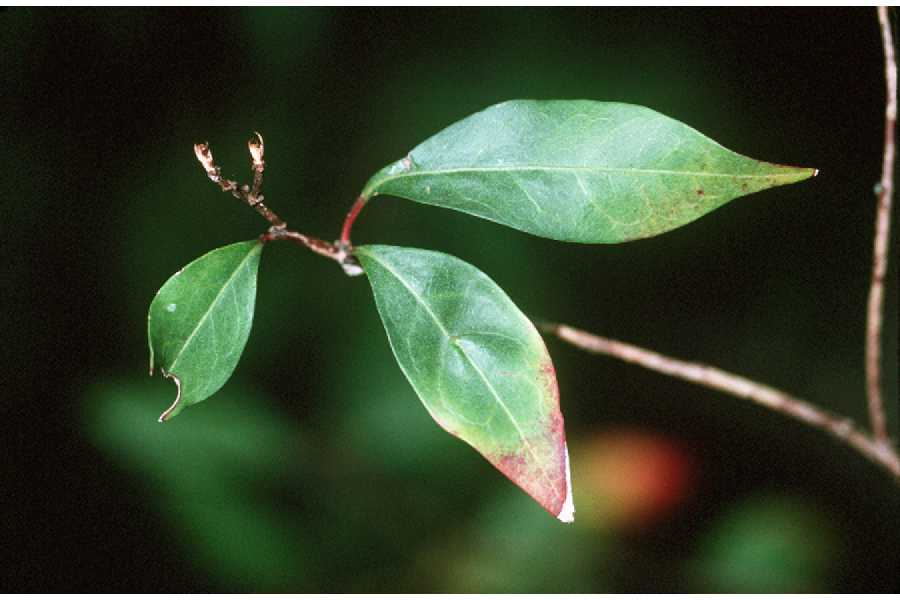

Scientific classification
- Kingdom: Plantae
- Clade: Tracheophytes
- Clade: Angiosperms
- Clade: Eudicots
- Clade: Rosids
- Order: Malpighiales
- Family: Euphorbiaceae
- Subfamily: Euphorbioideae
- Tribe: Hippomaneae
- Subtribe: Hippomaninae
- Genus: Ditrysinia; Raf.
- Species: D. fruticosa

Binomial name
- Ditrysinia fruticosa (W.Bartram) Govaerts & Frodin

Synonyms
- Stillingia fruticosa W.Bartram; Sebastiania fruticosa (W.Bartram) Fernald; Stillingia ligustrina Michx.; Stillingia frutescens Bosc ex Steud.; Ditrysinia ligustrina (Michx.) Raf.; Stillingia fruticosa Spreng.; Gymnanthes ligustrina (Michx.) Müll.Arg.; Gymnanthes ligustrina (Michx.) Müll.Arg.

= Ditrysinia =

Genus of flowering plants

Ditrysinia is a plant genus of the family Euphorbiaceae first described as a genus in 1825. It contains only one recognized species, Ditrysinia fruticosa, the Gulf Sebastian-bush, native to the southeastern United States (E Texas, Louisiana, SW Arkansas, Mississippi, Alabama, N Florida, Georgia, North + South Carolina).

Formerly included

moved to Stillingia

- Ditrysinia sylvatica (L.) Raf. ex B.D.Jacks. - Stillingia sylvatica L.

== Description ==
Ditrysinia fructicosa is a monoecious shrub. It may reach a height between 1.5 and 2.5 meters (approximately 5 to 8.2 feet).D. fructicosa's leaves are alternately arranged and range in shape from elliptic to lance-elliptic. They may reach a length of 3 to 7.5 centimeters (1.18 to 3 inches) and a width of 0.8 to 3.5 centimeters (0.3 to 1.4 inches).

== Habitat ==
This species is considered to be facultative to facultative wetland by the United States Department of Agriculture.

In general, D. fructicosa may be found in habitats that are mostly shaded and are considered moist-to-wet, such as swampy forests. However, due to its facultative nature, this species has been observed to occur in other types of habitats, such as: within a mesic woodland, within a floodplain forest, and on limestone bluffs.
