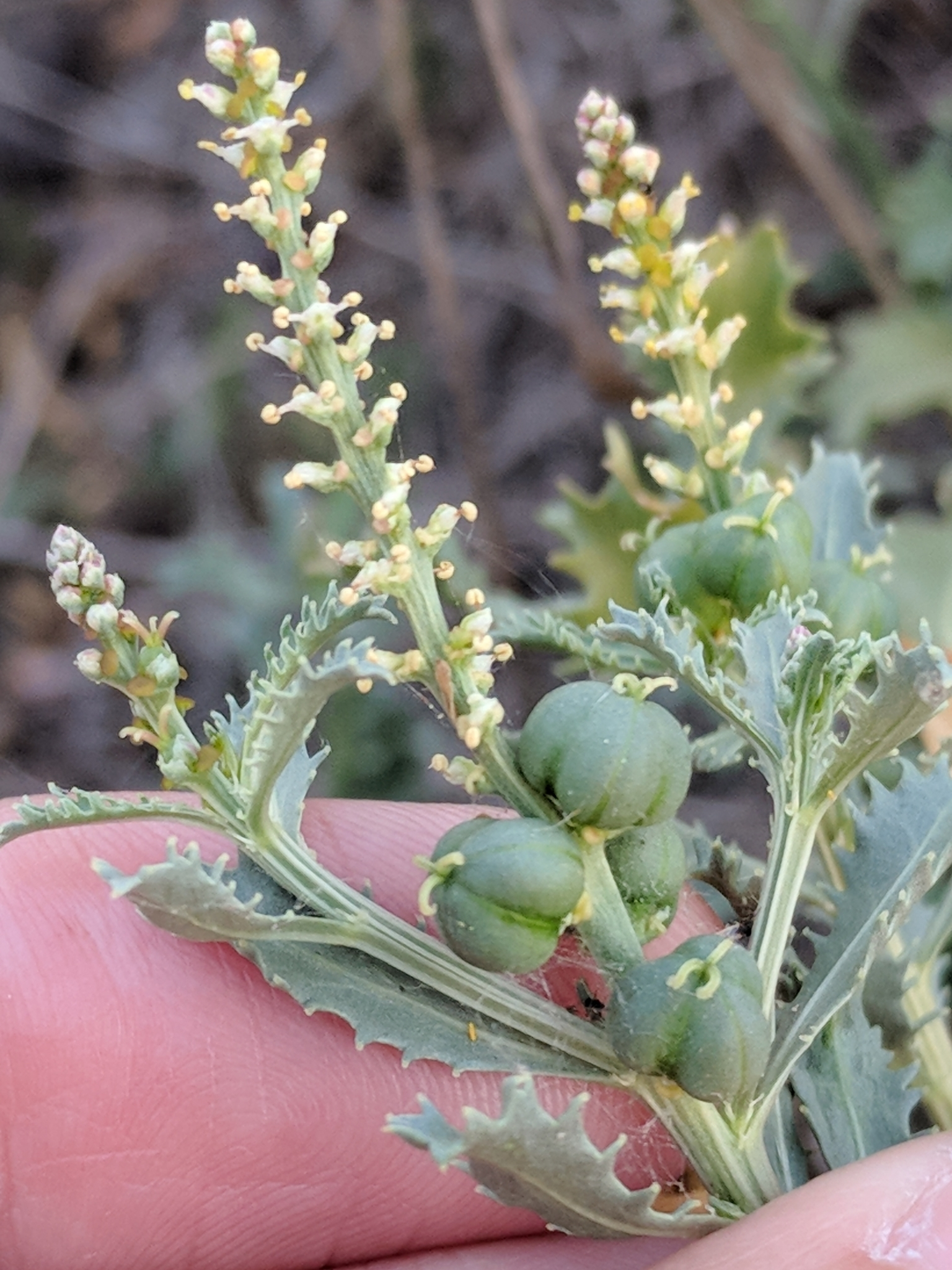
- In Val Verde County, Texas

Scientific classification
- Kingdom: Plantae
- Clade: Tracheophytes
- Clade: Angiosperms
- Clade: Eudicots
- Clade: Rosids
- Order: Malpighiales
- Family: Euphorbiaceae
- Genus: Stillingia
- Species: S. treculiana

Binomial name
- Stillingia treculiana (Müll.Arg.) I.M.Johnst.

Synonyms
- Gymnanthes treculiana Müll.Arg.; Sapium annuum var. dentatum Torr.; Sebastiania treculiana (Müll.Arg.) Müll.Arg.; Stillingia dentata (Torr.) Britton & Rusby; Stillingia torreyana S.Watson

= Stillingia treculiana =

Species of flowering plant

Stillingia treculiana, Trecul's toothleaf, is a species of flowering plant in the family Euphorbiaceae. It was originally described as Gymnanthes treculiana Müll.Arg. in 1865. It is native to southern Texas in the United States and northeast Mexico, growing in sandy and gravelly soils in dry habitats.
