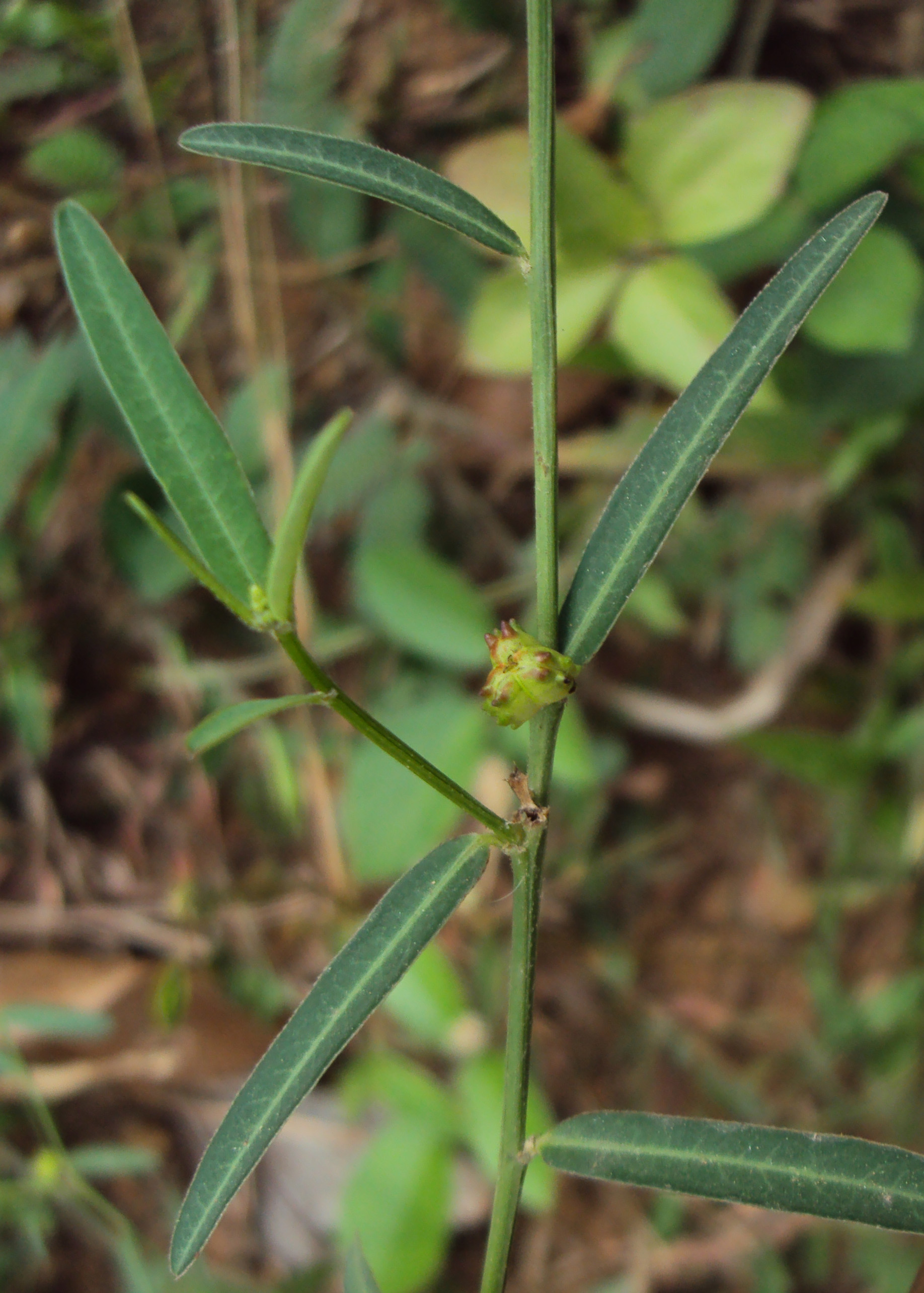
- Microstachys chamaelea

Scientific classification
- Kingdom: Plantae
- Clade: Tracheophytes
- Clade: Angiosperms
- Clade: Eudicots
- Clade: Rosids
- Order: Malpighiales
- Family: Euphorbiaceae
- Subfamily: Euphorbioideae
- Tribe: Hippomaneae
- Subtribe: Hippomaninae
- Genus: Microstachys; A.Juss.

Synonyms
- Cnemidostachys Mart.; Elachocroton F.Muell.; Tragiopsis H.Karst.

= Microstachys =

Genus of plants

Microstachys is a genus of plants in the Euphorbiaceae first described as a genus in 1824. It is native to tropical Africa, southern Asia, Australia, Papuasia, Mesoamerica, the West Indies, and South America.

Species

1. Microstachys acetosella - Angola, Zambia
2. Microstachys bidentata - Brazil, Bolivia, Suriname, Venezuela
3. Microstachys chamaelea - W Africa, India, Sri Lanka, S China, Indochina, Malaysia, W Indonesia, Solomon Islands, N Australia
4. Microstachys corniculata - from NW Mexico + West Indies south to Paraguay
5. Microstachys dalzielii - W Africa
6. Microstachys daphnoides - Bahia, Minas Gerais, Goiás
7. Microstachys ditassoides - Brazil
8. Microstachys faradianensis - W Africa
9. Microstachys glandulosa - Minas Gerais
10. Microstachys heterodoxa - Bahia
11. Microstachys hispida - Brazil, Bolivia, Paraguay, N Argentina
12. Microstachys marginata - Bahia, Minas Gerais
13. Microstachys nana - Paraná
14. Microstachys nummularifolia - Minas Gerais
15. Microstachys revoluta - Bahia
16. Microstachys serrulata - Brazil, Bolivia, Paraguay
17. Microstachys stipulacea - Uruguay, S Brazil
18. Microstachys uleana - Bahia

formerly included

moved to other genera (Micrococca Sebastiania )

- M. mercurialis - Micrococca mercurialis
- M. ramosissima - Sebastiania brasiliensis
