= Sebastiania cruenta =

Scientific classification
- Kingdom: Plantae
- Clade: Tracheophytes
- Clade: Angiosperms
- Clade: Eudicots
- Clade: Rosids
- Order: Malpighiales
- Family: Euphorbiaceae
- Genus: Sebastiania
- Species: S. cruenta

Binomial name
- Sebastiania cruenta (Standl. & Steyerm.) Miranda

Species of flowering plant

Sebastiania cruenta is a species of flowering plant in the family Euphorbiaceae. It was originally described as Stillingia cruenta Standl. & Steyerm. in 1944. It is native to Mexico and Guatemala.
