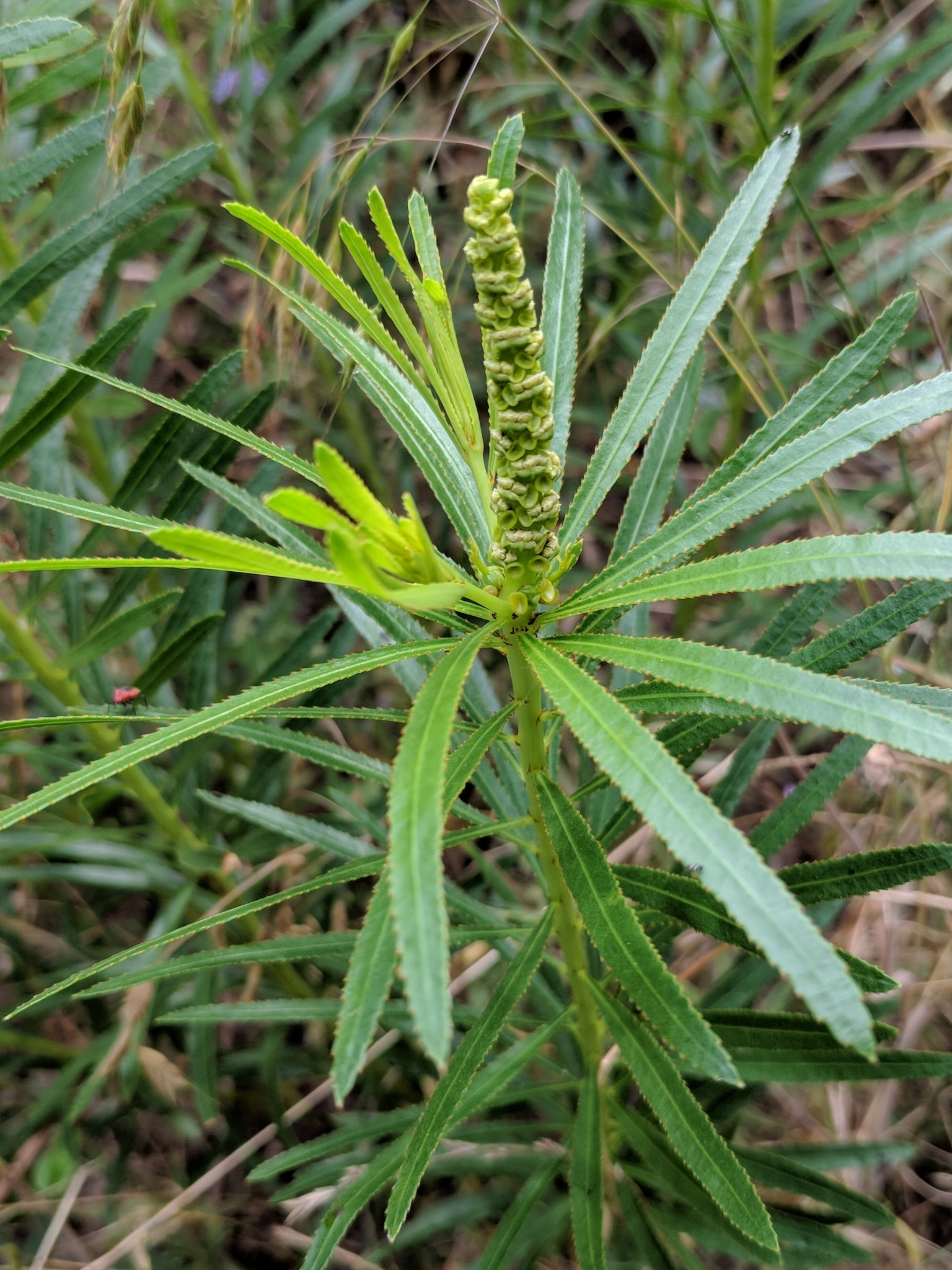
- Texas toothleaf in Williamson County, Texas

Scientific classification
- Kingdom: Plantae
- Clade: Tracheophytes
- Clade: Angiosperms
- Clade: Eudicots
- Clade: Rosids
- Order: Malpighiales
- Family: Euphorbiaceae
- Genus: Stillingia
- Species: S. texana

Binomial name
- Stillingia texana I.M.Johnst.

= Stillingia texana =

Species of flowering plant

Stillingia texana, the Texas toothleaf, is a species of flowering plant in the family Euphorbiaceae. It was described in 1923 by Ivan Murray Johnston.

== Distribution and habitat ==
S. texana is native to the South Central United States and Mexico. In central Texas, it is widespread in upland, calcareous prairies, spreading north to scattered locations in Oklahoma and south to Coahuila.

== Gallery ==
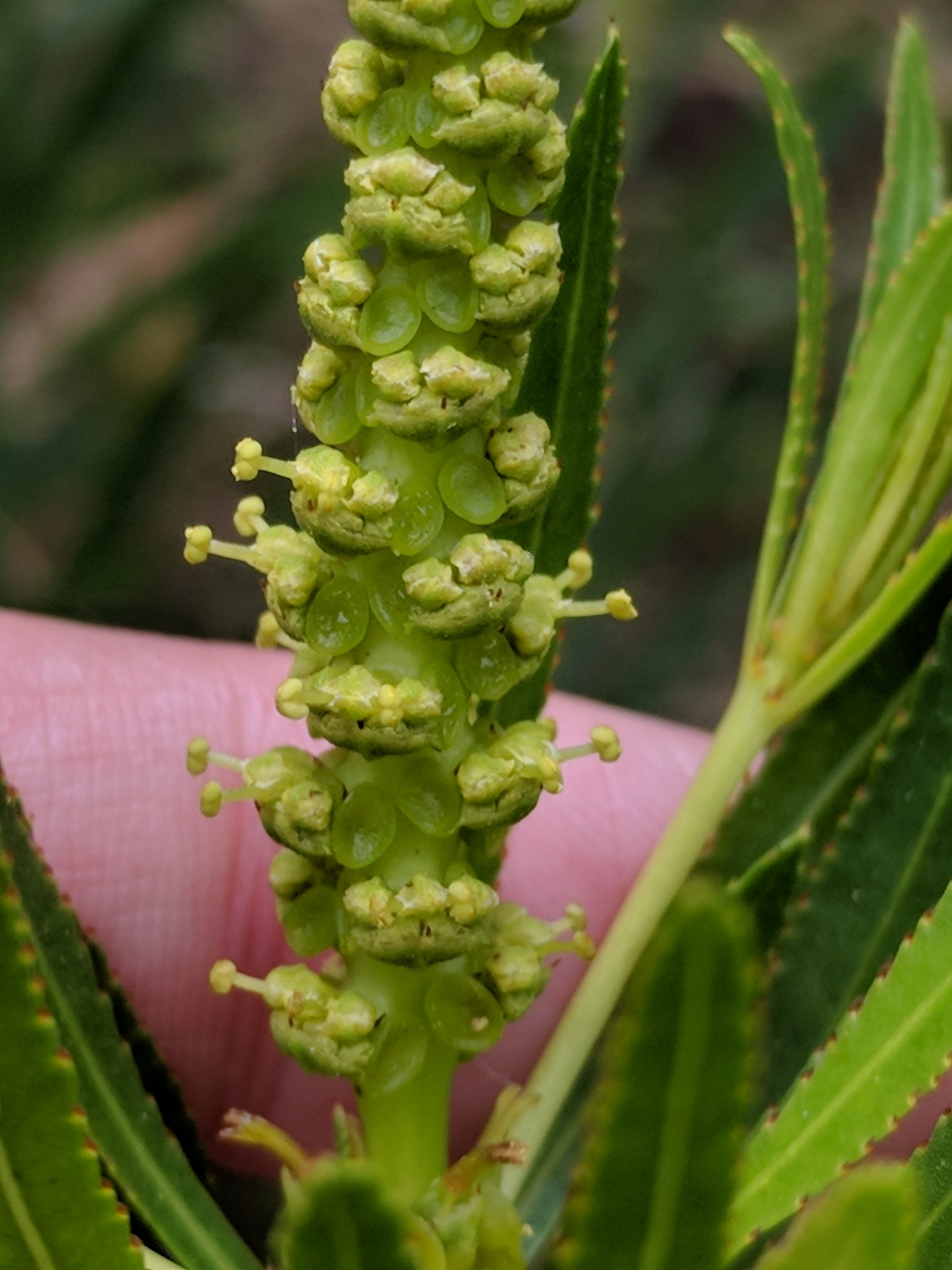
Flowers
