= Sebastiania pachystachya =

Scientific classification
- Kingdom: Plantae
- Clade: Tracheophytes
- Clade: Angiosperms
- Clade: Eudicots
- Clade: Rosids
- Order: Malpighiales
- Family: Euphorbiaceae
- Genus: Sebastiania
- Species: S. pachystachya

Binomial name
- Sebastiania pachystachya (Klotzsch) Müll.Arg.

Species of flowering plant

Sebastiania pachystachya is a species of flowering plant in the family Euphorbiaceae. It was originally described as Adenogyne pachystachys Klotzsch in 1841. It is native to São Paulo and Paraná, Brazil.
