= Sebastiania serrata =

Scientific classification
- Kingdom: Plantae
- Clade: Tracheophytes
- Clade: Angiosperms
- Clade: Eudicots
- Clade: Rosids
- Order: Malpighiales
- Family: Euphorbiaceae
- Genus: Sebastiania
- Species: S. serrata

Binomial name
- Sebastiania serrata (Baill. ex Müll.Arg.) Müll.Arg.

Synonyms
- Adenogyne serrata (Baill. ex Müll.Arg.) Klotzsch; Gymnanthes serrata Baill. ex Müll.Arg. Gymnanthes serrata var. glabra Müll.Arg. Sebastiania grandifolia (Chodat & Hassl.) Pax & K.Hoffm. Sebastiania serrata var. genuina Müll.Arg. Sebastiania serrata var. grandifolia Chodat & Hassl. Sebastiania serrata var. major Pax & K.Hoffm. Sebastiania serrata var. typica Pax & K.Hoffm. Stillingia serrata (Baill. ex Müll.Arg.) Klotzsch ex Baill.

Species of flowering plant

Sebastiania serrata is a species of flowering plant in the family Euphorbiaceae. It was originally described as Gymnanthes serrata Baill. ex Müll.Arg. in 1863. It is native from southeastern and southern Brazil to northeastern Argentina.
