= Sebastiania jacobinensis =

Scientific classification
- Kingdom: Plantae
- Clade: Tracheophytes
- Clade: Angiosperms
- Clade: Eudicots
- Clade: Rosids
- Order: Malpighiales
- Family: Euphorbiaceae
- Genus: Sebastiania
- Species: S. jacobinensis

Binomial name
- Sebastiania jacobinensis (Müll.Arg.) Müll.Arg.

Species of flowering plant

Sebastiania jacobinensis is a species of flowering plant in the family Euphorbiaceae. It was originally described as Gymnanthes jacobinensis Müll.Arg. in 1863. It is native to Bahia, Brazil.
