= Sebastiania bahiensis =

Scientific classification
- Kingdom: Plantae
- Clade: Tracheophytes
- Clade: Angiosperms
- Clade: Eudicots
- Clade: Rosids
- Order: Malpighiales
- Family: Euphorbiaceae
- Genus: Sebastiania
- Species: S. bahiensis

Binomial name
- Sebastiania bahiensis (Müll.Arg.) Müll.Arg.

Species of flowering plant

Sebastiania bahiensis is a species of flowering plant in the family Euphorbiaceae. It was originally described as Gymnanthes bahiensis Müll.Arg in 1863. It is native to Bahia, Brazil.
