= Sebastiania klotzschiana =

Scientific classification
- Kingdom: Plantae
- Clade: Tracheophytes
- Clade: Angiosperms
- Clade: Eudicots
- Clade: Rosids
- Order: Malpighiales
- Family: Euphorbiaceae
- Genus: Sebastiania
- Species: S. klotzschiana

Binomial name
- Sebastiania klotzschiana (Müll.Arg.) Müll.Arg.

Species of flowering plant

Sebastiania klotzschiana is a species of flowering plant in the family Euphorbiaceae. It was originally described as Gymnanthes klotzschiana Müll.Arg. in 1863. It is native to Brazil and northern Argentina.
