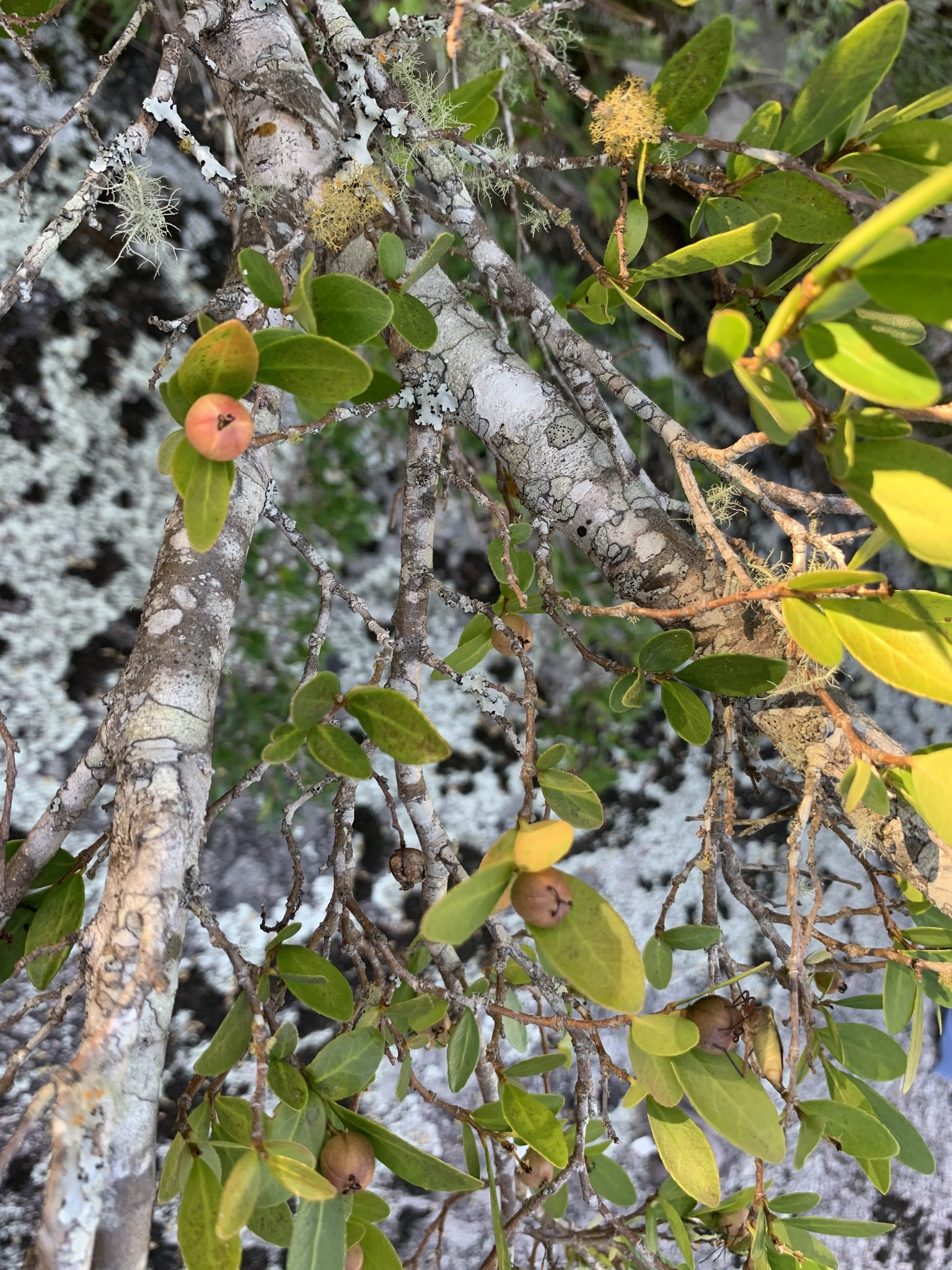

Scientific classification
- Kingdom: Plantae
- Clade: Tracheophytes
- Clade: Angiosperms
- Clade: Eudicots
- Clade: Rosids
- Order: Malpighiales
- Family: Euphorbiaceae
- Genus: Sebastiania
- Species: S. brasiliensis

Binomial name
- Sebastiania brasiliensis Spreng.

= Sebastiania brasiliensis =

Species of flowering plant

Sebastiania brasiliensis is a species of flowering plant in the family Euphorbiaceae. It was described in 1821. It is native from Colombia to Venezuela and Bolivia to Brazil and northern Argentina.
