= Käthe Hoffmann =

German botanist

Johanna Emilie Katharina Elizabeth "Käthe" Hoffmann (1 August 1883 – 30 December 1960) was a German botanist who described many plant species in New Guinea and South East Asia including Annesijoa novoguineensis. She was a high school teacher at Breslau, German Empire, (now Wrocław, Poland) and made a significant contribution to botany. In one study, she was found to have co-authored or authored 354 land plant species, the sixth-highest number authored by any female scientist. As of May 2020, Plants of the World Online lists 439 accepted genera and species which include Käthe Hoffmann in the authority, in some capacity.

== Life ==
She was born on 1 August 1883 in Breslau (now Wrocław, Poland). While some sources give her year of death as 1931, this is impossible as she was the author of two papers published in Revista Sudamericana de Botánica in 1942, one of them being an obituary of Ferdinand Albin Pax. According to the 'Berlin, Germany, Deaths, 1874-1986' database at Ancestry.com, as well as a death notice in Berichte der Deutschen Botanischen Gesellshaft, issue of 27 March 1961, she died in Berlin on 30 December 1960.

== Relationship to Käthe Rosenthal ==
Another female botanist's name, Käthe Rosenthal, is associated with the University of Breslau in the early 20th century. Her name appears alongside those of Ferdinand Pax and Käthe Hoffmann in issue 68 of Adolf Engler's multivolume work Das Pflanzenreich. Pax and Hoffmann are listed as the authors of three sections on parts of the family Euphorbiaceae. Rosenthal is listed as the author of a section on the family Daphniphyllaceae. Earlier, in 1916, a PhD thesis with the author Käthe Rosenthal had been published under the title "Monographie der Gattung Daphniphyllum" ("Monograph of the genus Daphniphyllum"). The International Plant Names Index (IPNI) gives Rosenthal's author abbreviation as "K.Rosenth." with the year of birth 1893, i.e. 10 years after Hoffmann. Rosenthal's dissertation on Daphniphyllum contains a Lebenslauf or résumé in which she identifies herself as the daughter of Rabbi Ferdinand Rosenthal, PhD, and his wife, Amalie, née Kaufmann. She also thanks, among others, Frl. Käthe Hoffmann "for valuable advice in my work" ("für wertvolle Ratschläge bei meiner Arbeit").

Some sources treat the two as the same person. Thus the Bibliothèque nationale de France gives Käthe Hoffmann's year of birth as 1893, and states that "Käthe Rosenthal" is "autre forme du nom" ("another form of name"). Käthe Hoffmann may also be given as the author of the Daphniphyllum monograph instead of Käthe Rosenthal.

== Selected publications ==
=== Das Pflanzenreich ===
Between 1911 and 1924, Ferdinand Pax and Käthe Hoffmann contributed almost all the sections on the family Euphorbiaceae to Engler's monumental work, Das Pflanzenreich (The Plant Kingdom). (The first two sections on the family, published in 1910, were by Pax alone; one section published in 1915 has a different author.) Up to 1914, Hoffmann's name appeared on the title page as "unter Mitwirkung von Käthe Hoffmann" ('with the participation of'). From 1919 onwards, she was credited as the second author.

- F. Pax with the participation of Käthe Hoffmann (1911). "IV. 147. III Euphorbiaceae–Cluytieae". Heft (issue) 47.
- F. Pax with the participation of Käthe Hoffmann (1912). "IV. 147. IV Euphorbiaceae-Gelonieae". Heft 52.
- F. Pax with the participation of Käthe Hoffmann (1912). "IV. 147. V Euphorbiaceae-Hippomaneae". Heft 52.
- F. Pax with the participation of Käthe Hoffmann (1912). "IV. 147. VI Euphorbiaceae-Acalypheae-Chrozophorinae". Heft 57.
- F. Pax with the participation of Käthe Hoffmann (1914). "IV. 147. VII Euphorbiaceaee-Acalypheae-Mercurialinae". Heft 63.
- F. Pax & Käthe Hoffman (1919). "IV. 147. IX Euphorbiaceae-Acalypheae-Plukenetiinae". Heft 68.
- F. Pax & Käthe Hoffman (1919). "IV. 147. X Euphorbiaceae-Acalypheae-Epiprininae". Heft 68.
- F. Pax & Käthe Hoffman (1919). "IV. 147. XI Euphorbiaceae-Acalypheae-Ricininae". Heft 68.
- F. Pax & Käthe Hoffman (1919). "IV. 147. XII Euphorbiaceae-Dalechampieae". Heft 68.
- F. Pax & Käthe Hoffman (1919). "IV. 147. XIII Euphorbiaceae-Pereae". Heft 68.
- F. Pax & Käthe Hoffman (1919). "IV. 147. XIV Euphorbiaceae-Aditamentum IV". Heft 68.
- F. Pax & Käthe Hoffman (1922). "IV. 147. XV Euphorbiaceae-Phyllanthoideae-Phyllantheae". Heft 81.
- F. Pax & Käthe Hoffman (1924). "IV. 147. XVI Euphorbiaceae-Crotonoideae-Acalypheae-Acalyphinae". Heft 85.
