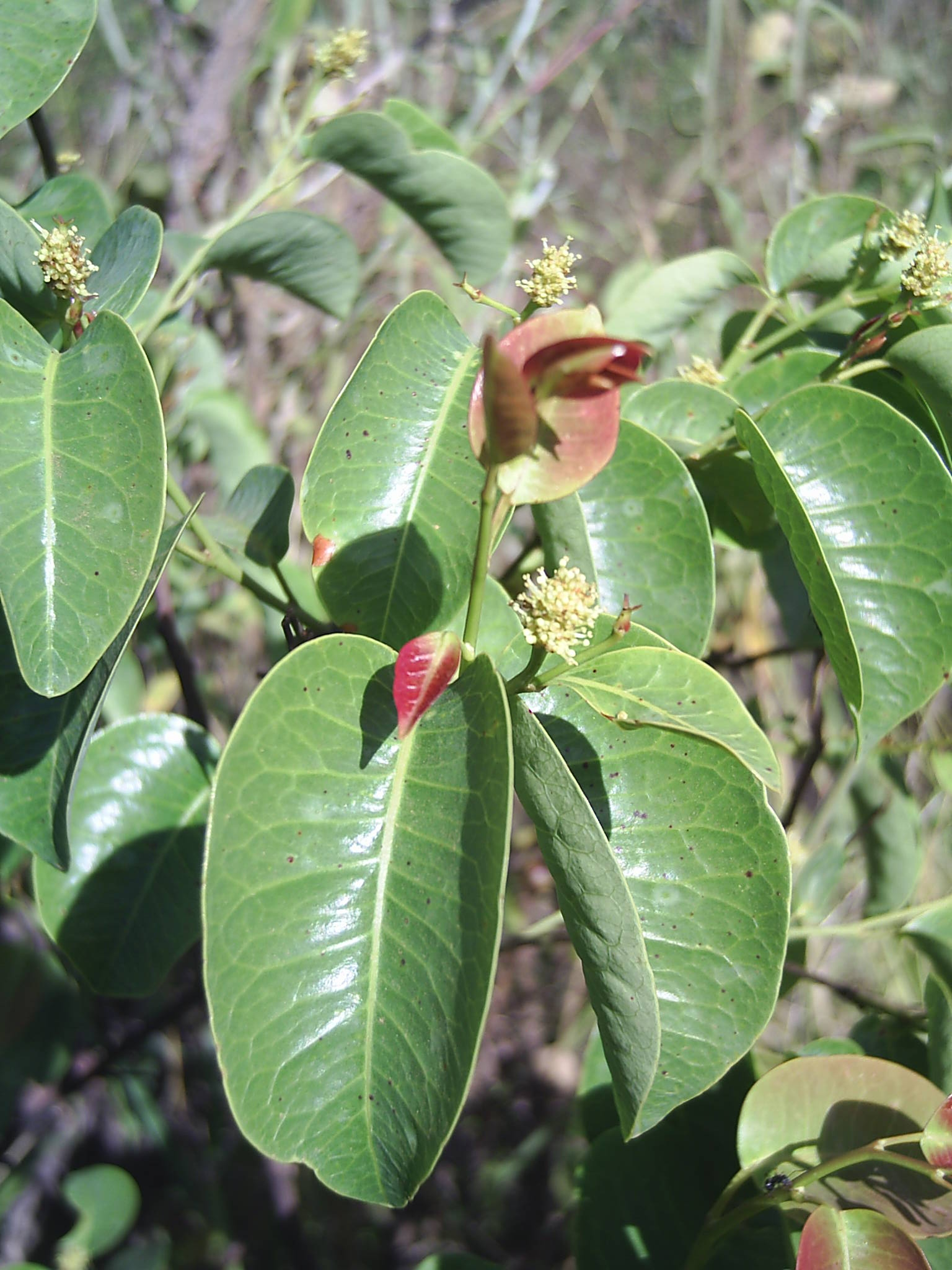
- Maprounea guianensis

Scientific classification
- Kingdom: Plantae
- Clade: Tracheophytes
- Clade: Angiosperms
- Clade: Eudicots
- Clade: Rosids
- Order: Malpighiales
- Family: Euphorbiaceae
- Subfamily: Euphorbioideae
- Tribe: Hippomaneae
- Subtribe: Hippomaninae
- Genus: Maprounea; Aubl.

Synonyms
- Aegopicron Giseke; Aegopricon L.f.; Aegopricum L.

= Maprounea =

Genus of flowering plants

Maprounea is a plant genus of the family Euphorbiaceae first named as a genus in 1775. It is native to tropical Africa, Trinidad, and tropical Central and South America.

Species

1. Maprounea africana - W + C + S Africa, from Benin to Zimbabwe
2. Maprounea amazonica - Colombia, Venezuela, N Brazil
3. Maprounea brasiliensis - Brazil, Paraguay, Bolivia
4. Maprounea guianensis - Trinidad, Panama, Colombia, Venezuela, French Guiana, Suriname, Guyana, Brazil, Peru, Ecuador, Bolivia, Paraguay
5. Maprounea membranacea - Nigeria, Cameroon, Gabon, Equatorial Guinea, Cabinda, Central African Republic, Congo, Zaire

Formerly included

moved to Mabea

- Maprounea glauca - Mabea taquari
