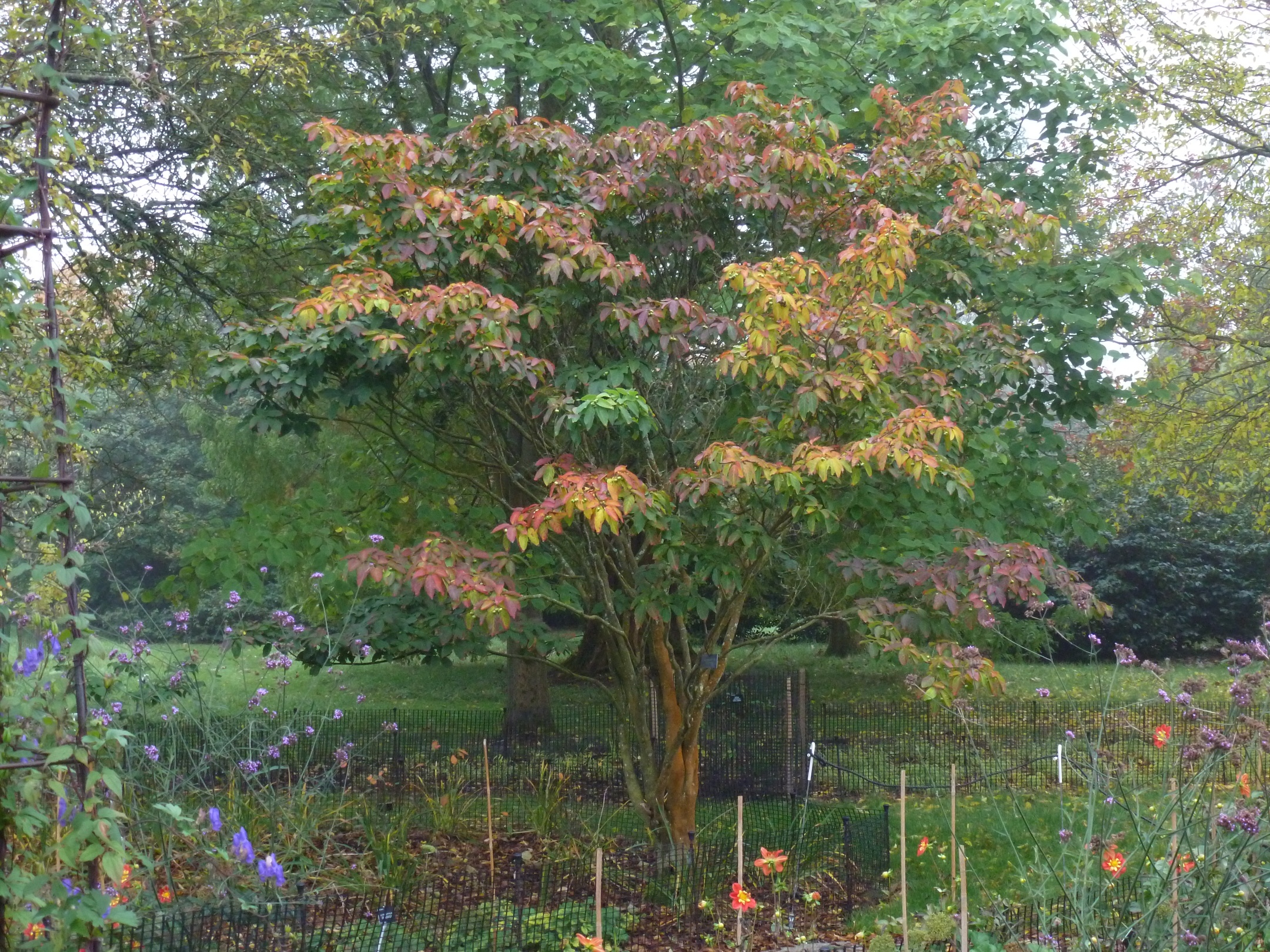

Conservation status
- Least Concern (IUCN 3.1)

Scientific classification
- Kingdom: Plantae
- Clade: Tracheophytes
- Clade: Angiosperms
- Clade: Eudicots
- Clade: Rosids
- Order: Malpighiales
- Family: Euphorbiaceae
- Subfamily: Euphorbioideae
- Tribe: Hippomaneae
- Subtribe: Hippomaninae
- Genus: Neoshirakia; Esser
- Species: N. japonica

Binomial name
- Neoshirakia japonica (Siebold & Zucc.) Esser

Synonyms
- Shirakia Hurus., illegitimate name; Stillingia japonica Siebold & Zucc.; Triadica japonica (Siebold & Zucc.) Baill.; Excoecaria japonica (Siebold & Zucc.) Müll.Arg.; Sapium japonicum (Siebold & Zucc.) Pax & K.Hoffm.; Shirakia japonica (Siebold & Zucc.) Hurus.; Croton sirakii Siebold & Zucc.; Neoshirakia atrobadiomaculata (F.P.Metcalf) Esser & P.T.Li; Sapium atrobadiomaculatum F.P.Metcalf

= Neoshirakia =

Genus of flowering plants

Neoshirakia, known as milktree, is a genus of plants in the Euphorbiaceae, native to east Asia. It is part of a group first described in 1954 with the name Shirakia, but this proved to be an illegitimate name, unacceptable under the Code of Nomenclature. The genus was later divided, with its species distributed amongst three genera: Neoshirakia, Shirakiopsis, and Triadica. Neoshirakia contains only one known species, Neoshirakia japonica, known as tallow tree, native to China, Korea, and Japan (including Nansei-shotō). The name Shirakia thus became a synonym of Neoshirakia because S. japonica was the type species for that genus, the species now renamed N. japonica.
