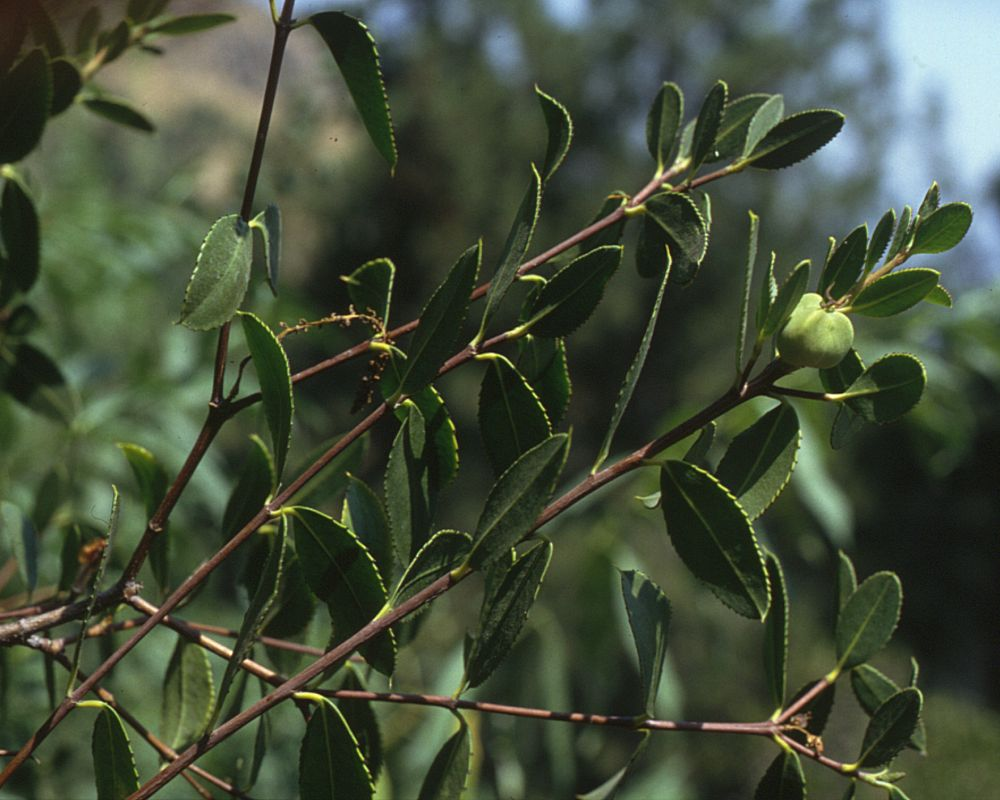
- Colliguaja odorifera

Scientific classification
- Kingdom: Plantae
- Clade: Tracheophytes
- Clade: Angiosperms
- Clade: Eudicots
- Clade: Rosids
- Order: Malpighiales
- Family: Euphorbiaceae
- Subfamily: Euphorbioideae
- Tribe: Hippomaneae
- Subtribe: Hippomaninae

Genera
- See text

= Hippomaninae =

Subtribe of flowering plants

Hippomaninae are plants of the family Euphorbiaceae. It is a subtribe of the Hippomaneae and has 32 genera:

- Actinostemon
- Adenopeltis
- Anomostachys
- Balakata
- Bonania (also called Hypocoton)
- Colliguaja
- Conosapium
- Dalembertia (also called Alcoceria)
- Dendrocousinsia
- Dendrothrix
- Ditrysinia
- Duvigneaudia
- Excoecaria (also called Commia, Glyphostylus)
- Falconeria
- Grimmeodendron
- Gymnanthes (also called Adenogyne, Ateramnus)
- Hippomane (also called Mancanilla, Mancinella)
- Mabea
- Maprounea (also called Aegopicron, Aegopricon, Aegopricum)
- Microstachys
- Neoshirakia (also called Shirakia)
- Pleradenophora
- Pseudosenefeldera
- Rhodothyrsus
- Sapium (also called Carumbium, Gymnobothrys, Sapiopsis, Seborium, Stillingfleetia, Taeniosapium), Chinese tallow
- Sclerocroton
- Sebastiania (also called Clonostachys, Cnemidostachys, Elachocroton, Gussonia, Microstachys, Sarothrostachys, and Tragiopsis)
- Senefeldera
- Senefelderopsis
- Shirakiopsis
- Spegazziniophytum
- Spirostachys
- Stillingia (also called Gymnostillingia)
- Triadica
