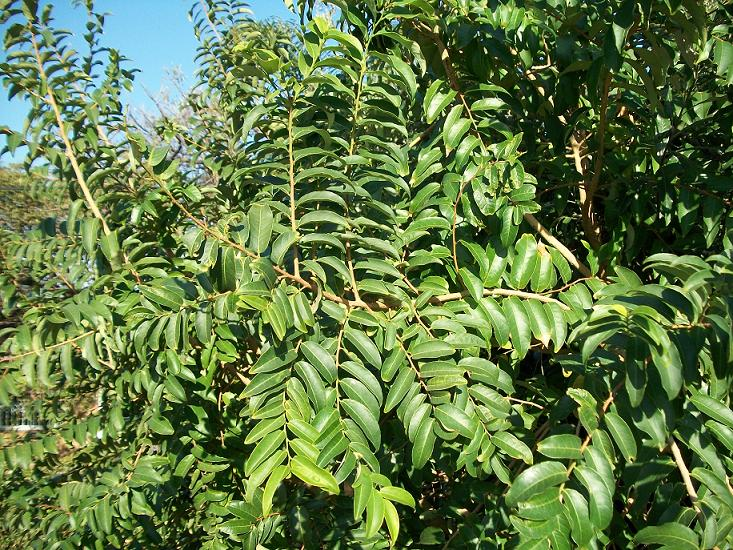
- Sclerocroton integerrimus

Scientific classification
- Kingdom: Plantae
- Clade: Tracheophytes
- Clade: Angiosperms
- Clade: Eudicots
- Clade: Rosids
- Order: Malpighiales
- Family: Euphorbiaceae
- Subfamily: Euphorbioideae
- Tribe: Hippomaneae
- Subtribe: Hippomaninae
- Genus: Sclerocroton; Hochst.

= Sclerocroton =

Genus of flowering plants

Sclerocroton is a plant genus of the family Euphorbiaceae first described as a genus in 1845. There a total of 6 known species in this genus; 5 species in continental Africa and a single species in Madagascar.

Species

1. Sclerocroton carterianus (J.Léonard) Kruijt & Roebers - Liberia, Ivory Coast, Sierra Leone
2. Sclerocroton cornutus (Pax) Kruijt & Roebers - C + SC Africa from Cameroon to Zimbabwe plus Ivory Coast
3. Sclerocroton integerrimus Hochst. - C + S Africa from Zaire to KawZulu-Natal, plus Guinea
4. Sclerocroton melanostictus (Baill.) Kruijt & Roebers - Madagascar
5. Sclerocroton oblongifolius (Müll.Arg.) Kruijt & Roebers - Zaire, Angola, Zambia, Zimbabwe
6. Sclerocroton schmitzii (J.Léonard) Kruijt & Roebers - Zaire, Rwanda, Burundi, Zambia, Zimbabwe

Formerly included

moved to Shirakiopsis

- Sclerocroton ellipticus - Shirakiopsis elliptica
