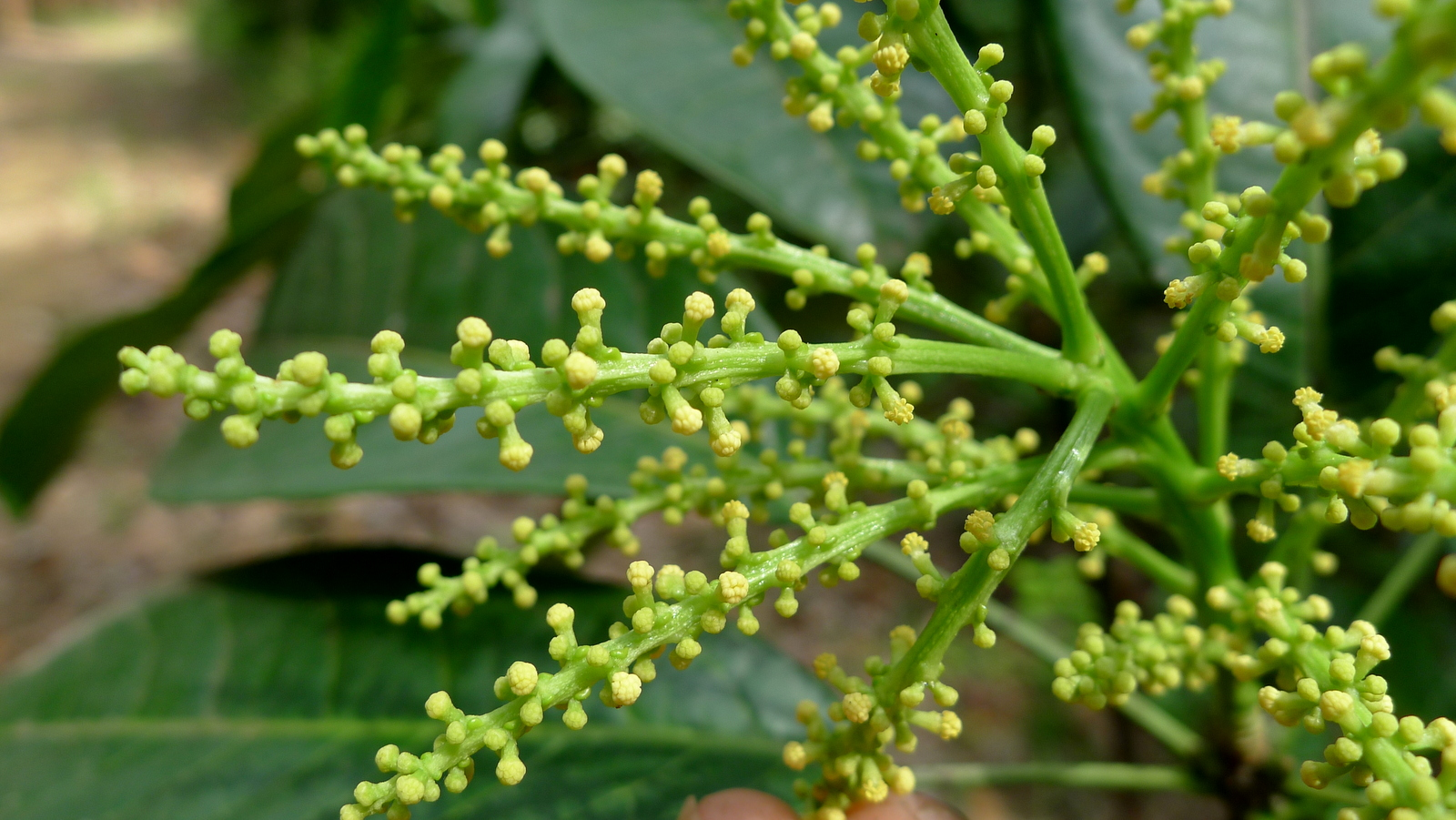
- Senefeldera verticillata flowers

Scientific classification
- Kingdom: Plantae
- Clade: Tracheophytes
- Clade: Angiosperms
- Clade: Eudicots
- Clade: Rosids
- Order: Malpighiales
- Family: Euphorbiaceae
- Subfamily: Euphorbioideae
- Tribe: Hippomaneae
- Subtribe: Hippomaninae
- Genus: Senefeldera; Mart.

Species
- Several, see text

= Senefeldera =

Genus of flowering plants

Senefeldera is a plant genus of the spurge family (Euphorbiaceae). Their wood can be used as timber, in handicraft and as firewood. It is native to Brazil, Colombia, Peru and Venezuela.

The genus was circumscribed by Mart. in Flora vol.24 (2) on page 29 in 1841.

The genus name of Senefeldera is in honour of Johann Alois Senefelder (1771–1834), who was a German actor and playwright who invented the printing technique of lithography in the 1790s.

== Species ==
Kew accepts 3 species;

- Senefeldera testiculata Pittier
- Senefeldera triandra Pax & K.Hoffm.
- Senefeldera verticillata (Vell.) Croizat
