= Dendrothrix =

Scientific classification
- Kingdom: Plantae
- Clade: Tracheophytes
- Clade: Angiosperms
- Clade: Eudicots
- Clade: Rosids
- Order: Malpighiales
- Family: Euphorbiaceae
- Subfamily: Euphorbioideae
- Tribe: Hippomaneae
- Subtribe: Hippomaninae
- Genus: Dendrothrix; Esser

Genus of flowering plants

Dendrothrix is a plant genus of the family Euphorbiaceae first described as a genus in 1996. It is native to southern Venezuela and northwestern Brazil.

Species

1. Dendrothrix multiglandulosa Esser - Amazonas State in Venezuela
2. Dendrothrix wurdackii Esser - Amazonas State in Brazil
3. Dendrothrix yutajensis (Jabl.) Esser - Amazonas State in Brazil; Amazonas & Bolívar States in Venezuela
