= Carumbium =

Carumbium can be one of these two plant genera:

- Carumbium Kurz, which is a synonym of Sapium.
- Carumbium Reinw., which is a synonym of Homalanthus.
