= Balakata =

Scientific classification
- Kingdom: Plantae
- Clade: Tracheophytes
- Clade: Angiosperms
- Clade: Eudicots
- Clade: Rosids
- Order: Malpighiales
- Family: Euphorbiaceae
- Subfamily: Euphorbioideae
- Tribe: Hippomaneae
- Subtribe: Hippomaninae
- Genus: Balakata; Esser

Synonyms
- Sapium sect. Pleurostachya Pax & K.Hoffmann.

Genus of flowering plants

Balakata is a genus of trees in the family Euphorbiaceae first described as a genus in 1999. It is native to Southeast Asia, southern China, the Himalayas, and New Guinea. The genus name was inspired by balákat-gúbat ("shoulder-tree"), the Philippine common name for B. luzonica.

Balakata baccata grows up to 26 meters tall, while B. luzonica can reach 36 metres (118 ft). These trees have alternately arranged leaves 3.5 to 11 centimetres (1.4 to 4.3 in) long, usually with large basal glands on the undersides. The undersides are also whitish in color in B. baccata, but not in B. luzonica. The former has longer petioles than the latter. The trees are monoecious, with inflorescences containing several male flowers and usually at least one female flower at the base. The fruit is smooth and fleshy. That of B. baccata usually contains two seeds, while the fruit of B. luzonica has a single seed.

Both species yield useful wood; B. luzonica wood may have commercial value.

Species

1. Balakata baccata (Roxb.) Esser - Yunnan, Bangladesh, Cambodia, Assam, Bhutan, Andaman & Nicobar, Borneo, Sumatra, Laos, Malaysia, Myanmar, Thailand, Vietnam
2. Balakata luzonica (Vidal) Esser - Philippines, Sulawesi, Maluku, New Guinea
