= C. salicifolia =

C. salicifolia may refer to:

- Camellia salicifolia, a plant species in the genus Camellia
- Clidemia salicifolia, a plant species in the genus Clidemia
- Colliguaja salicifolia, a plant species in the genus Colliguaja
- Commelina salicifolia, a synonym for Commelina communis

== See also ==
- Salicifolia (disambiguation)
