= S. spicata =

S. spicata may refer to:

== Species ==
- Schenkia spicata, an annual herb species with a very wide old world distribution
- Sebastiania spicata, a plant species endemic to Jamaica

== Synonyms ==
- Spathoglottis spicata, a synonym for Spathoglottis plicata, the large purple orchid, a terrestrial orchid species
- Stomoisia spicata, a synonym for Utricularia erectiflora, a small carnivorous plant species

== See also ==
- The dictionary definition of Spicata at Wiktionary
