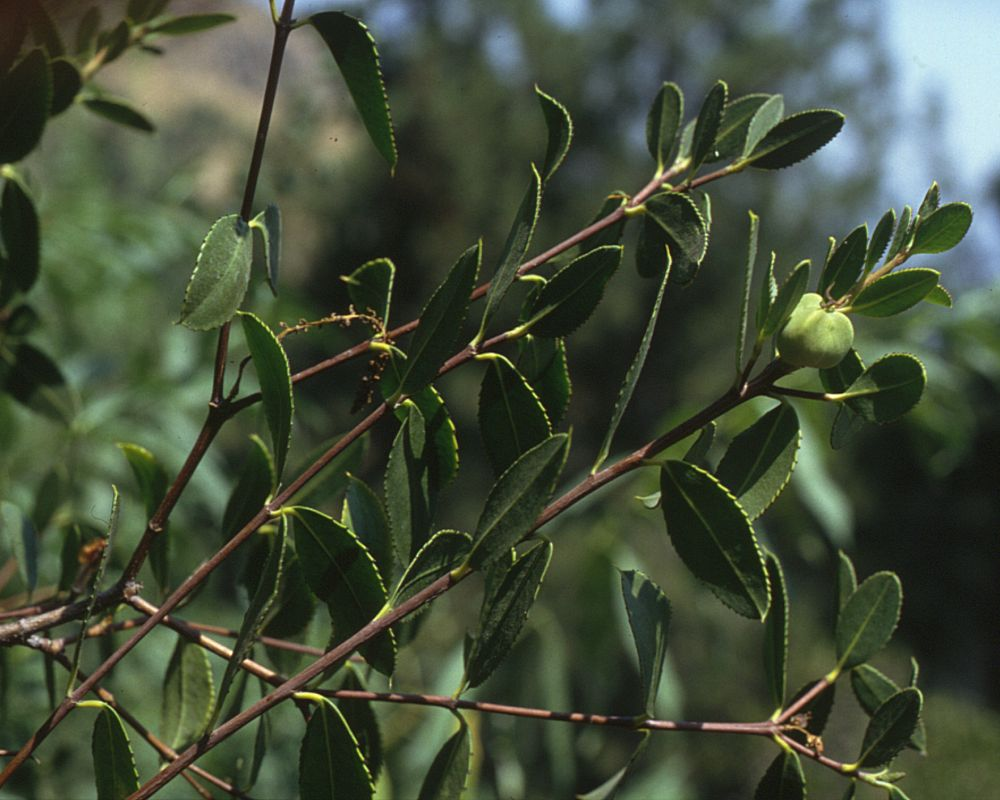
- Colliguaja odorifera

Scientific classification
- Kingdom: Plantae
- Clade: Tracheophytes
- Clade: Angiosperms
- Clade: Eudicots
- Clade: Rosids
- Order: Malpighiales
- Family: Euphorbiaceae
- Subfamily: Euphorbioideae
- Tribe: Hippomaneae
- Subtribe: Hippomaninae
- Genus: Colliguaja; Molina

= Colliguaja =

Genus of flowering plants

Colliguaja is a plant genus of the family Euphorbiaceae first described as a genus in 1782. It is native to South America.

Species

1. Colliguaja brasillensis Klotzsch ex Baill. - Paraguay, S Brazil, Uruguay
2. Colliguaja dombeyana A.Juss. - S Chile
3. Colliguaja integerrima Gillies & Hook. - S Chile, W Argentina
4. Colliguaja odorifera Molina - N & C Chile
5. Colliguaja salicifolia Gillies & Hook. - C Chile

Formerly included

moved to Spegazziniophytum

- Colliguaja patagonica Speg. - Spegazziniophytum patagonicum (Speg.) Esser in A.Radcliffe-Smith
