= Bonania =

Scientific classification
- Kingdom: Plantae
- Clade: Tracheophytes
- Clade: Angiosperms
- Clade: Eudicots
- Clade: Rosids
- Order: Malpighiales
- Family: Euphorbiaceae
- Subfamily: Euphorbioideae
- Tribe: Hippomaneae
- Subtribe: Hippomaninae
- Genus: Bonania; A.Rich.

Synonyms
- Hypocoton Urb.

Genus of flowering plants

Bonania is a plant genus of the family Euphorbiaceae first described as a genus in 1850. It is native to the West Indies.

species

1. Bonania cubana A.Rich. - Bahamas, Cuba
2. Bonania domingensis (Urb.) Urb. - Haiti, Dominican Rep
3. Bonania elliptica Urb. - Cuba
4. Bonania emarginata C.Wright ex Griseb. - Cuba
5. Bonania erythrosperma (Griseb.) Benth. & Hook.f. ex B.D.Jacks. - Cuba
6. Bonania linearifolia Urb. & Ekman - Haiti
7. †Bonania myricifolia (Griseb.) Benth. & Hook.f. - Guantánamo but extinct

formerly included

moved to Sapium

- B. adenodon - Sapium adenodon
