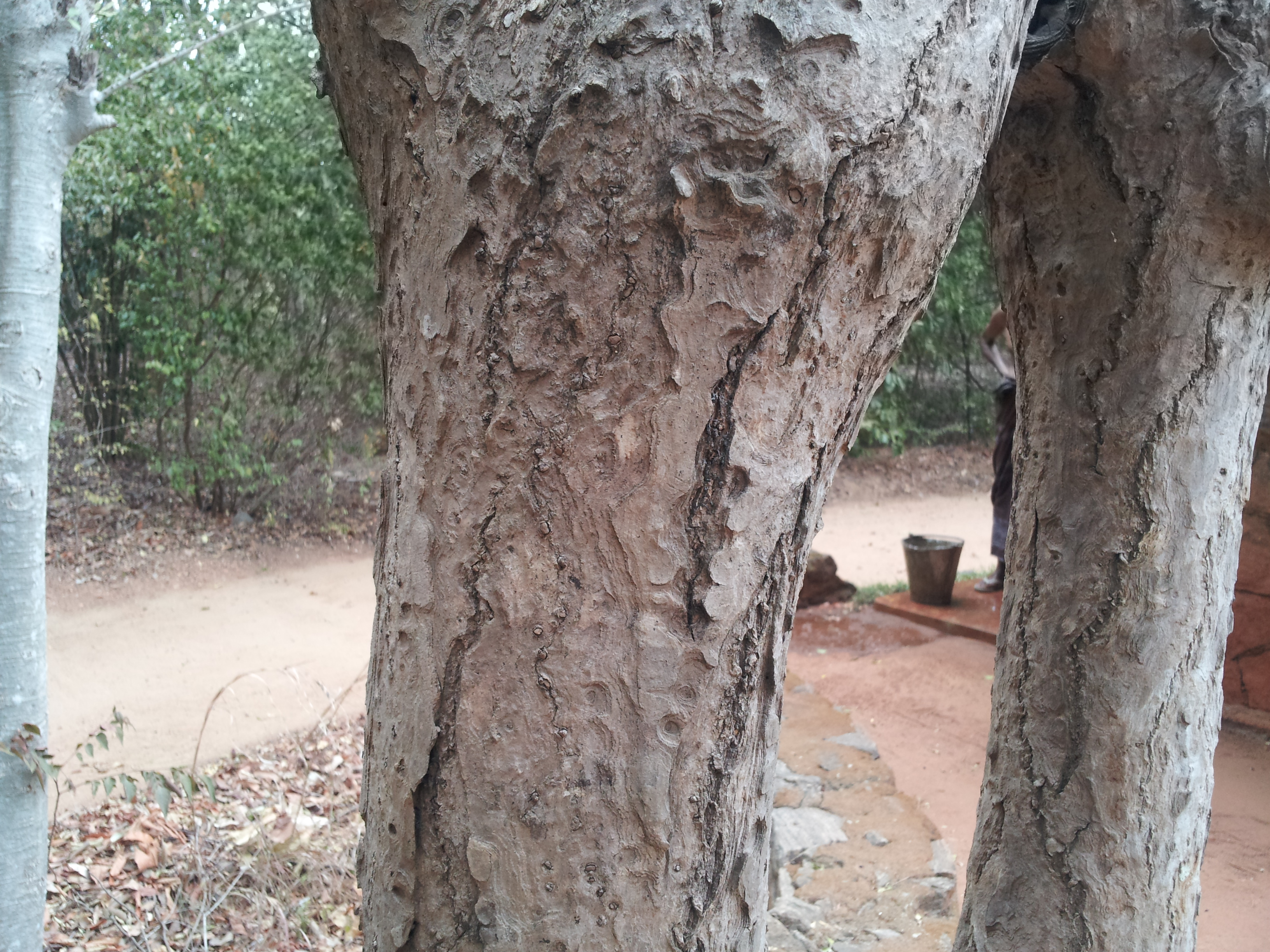

Scientific classification
- Kingdom: Plantae
- Clade: Tracheophytes
- Clade: Angiosperms
- Clade: Eudicots
- Clade: Rosids
- Order: Malpighiales
- Family: Euphorbiaceae
- Subfamily: Euphorbioideae
- Tribe: Hippomaneae
- Subtribe: Hippomaninae
- Genus: Falconeria; Royle 1839 not Hook.f. 1883 (Plantaginaceae)
- Species: F. insignis

Binomial name
- Falconeria insignis Royle

Synonyms
- Excoecaria insignis (Royle) Müll.Arg.; Carumbium insigne (Royle) Kurz; Sapium insigne (Royle) Trimen; Falconeria wallichiana Royle; Falconeria malabarica Wight; Gymnobothrys lucida Wall. ex Baill.; Sapium insigne var. malabaricum (Wight) Hook.f.

= Falconeria =

Genus of flowering plants

Falconeria is a monotypic plant genus in the family Euphorbiaceae, first described as a genus in 1839. The genus is sometimes included within the genus Sapium. The sole species is Falconeria insignis. The plant is found from India, Nepal, Bangladesh, and Sri Lanka to Indochina, China (Hainan, Sichuan, Yunnan), Thailand and Peninsular Malaysia.

The same genus name, Falconeria, was applied in 1883 to another plant in the Plantaginaceae. Thus was created an illegitimate homonym, unacceptable under the rules of nomenclature. The only species name ever created in this homonymic genus was Falconeria himalaica Hook.f., now renamed Wulfenia himalaica (Hook.f.) Pennell.
