= Dendrocousinsia =

Scientific classification
- Kingdom: Plantae
- Clade: Tracheophytes
- Clade: Angiosperms
- Clade: Eudicots
- Clade: Rosids
- Order: Malpighiales
- Family: Euphorbiaceae
- Subfamily: Euphorbioideae
- Tribe: Hippomaneae
- Subtribe: Hippomaninae
- Genus: Dendrocousinsia; Millsp.

Genus of flowering plants

Dendrocousinsia is a plant genus of the family Euphorbiaceae first described as a genus in 1913. The entire genus is endemic to the Island of Jamaica.

Species

1. Dendrocousinsia alpina Fawc. & Rendle 1919 - E Jamaica
2. Dendrocousinsia fasciculata Millsp. 1913 - NW Jamaica
3. Dendrocousinsia spicata Millsp. 1913 - SC Jamaica
