= Pseudosenefeldera =

Scientific classification
- Kingdom: Plantae
- Clade: Tracheophytes
- Clade: Angiosperms
- Clade: Eudicots
- Clade: Rosids
- Order: Malpighiales
- Family: Euphorbiaceae
- Subfamily: Euphorbioideae
- Tribe: Hippomaneae
- Subtribe: Hippomaninae
- Genus: Pseudosenefeldera; Esser
- Species: P. inclinata

Binomial name
- Pseudosenefeldera inclinata (Müll.Arg.) Esser

Synonyms
- Senefeldera inclinata Müll.Arg.; Senefeldera karsteniana Pax & K.Hoffm.; Senefeldera nitida Croizat; Senefeldera skutchiana Croizat; Senefeldera contracta R.E.Schult.

Genus of trees

Pseudosenefeldera is a plant genus of the family Euphorbiaceae first described as a genus in 2001. It contains only one known species, Pseudosenefeldera inclinata, native to Panama and to northern and west-central South America (Venezuela, Colombia, Ecuador, Peru, Bolivia, northwestern Brazil (Amazonas + Acre).
