= Anomostachys =

Conservation status
- Least Concern (IUCN 3.1)

Scientific classification
- Kingdom: Plantae
- Clade: Tracheophytes
- Clade: Angiosperms
- Clade: Eudicots
- Clade: Rosids
- Order: Malpighiales
- Family: Euphorbiaceae
- Subfamily: Euphorbioideae
- Tribe: Hippomaneae
- Subtribe: Hippomaninae
- Genus: Anomostachys (Baill.) Hurus.
- Species: A. lastellei

Binomial name
- Anomostachys lastellei (Müll.Arg.) Kruijt

Synonyms
- Excoecaria lastellei Müll.Arg.; Stillingia lastellei Baill.; Sapium gymnogyne Leandri; Sapium loziense Leandri; Sapium perrieri Leandri

Genus of flowering plants

Anomostachys is a plant genus of the family Euphorbiaceae first described as a genus in 1951. It contains one known species, Anomostachys lastellei, endemic to Madagascar.

== Description ==
Anomostachys lastellei is a tree which grows up to 20 meters high.

== Range and habitat ==
Anomostachys lastellei is native to Antananarivo, Antsiranana, Fianarantsoa, Toamasina, Toliara and Mahajanga provinces of eastern Madagascar.

It inhabits the humid lowland forests and mid-elevation montane forests from 80 to 1,150 meters elevation. It is found in primary forests and degraded vegetation, on humus, sandy, rocky, or quartzitic soils.
