= Grimmeodendron =

Scientific classification
- Kingdom: Plantae
- Clade: Tracheophytes
- Clade: Angiosperms
- Clade: Eudicots
- Clade: Rosids
- Order: Malpighiales
- Family: Euphorbiaceae
- Subfamily: Euphorbioideae
- Tribe: Hippomaneae
- Subtribe: Hippomaninae
- Genus: Grimmeodendron; Urb.

Type species
- Grimmeodendron jamaicense Urb.

Genus of flowering plants

Grimmeodendron is a plant genus of the family Euphorbiaceae first described as a genus in 1908. It is native to the West Indies.

Species

1. Grimmeodendron eglandulosum (A.Rich.) Urb. - Bahamas, Cuba, Hispaniola (Dominican Republic, Haiti)
2. Grimmeodendron jamaicense Urb. - Jamaica
