= Dalembertia =

Scientific classification
- Kingdom: Plantae
- Clade: Tracheophytes
- Clade: Angiosperms
- Clade: Eudicots
- Clade: Rosids
- Order: Malpighiales
- Family: Euphorbiaceae
- Subfamily: Euphorbioideae
- Tribe: Hippomaneae
- Subtribe: Hippomaninae
- Genus: Dalembertia; Baill.

Synonyms
- Alcoceria Fernald

Genus of flowering plants

Dalembertia is a plant genus of the family Euphorbiaceae first described as a genus in 1858. It is native to Mexico and Guatemala.

Species

1. Dalembertia hahniana Baill. - México State, Morelos, Michoacán
2. Dalembertia platanoides Baill. - Oaxaca, Guerrero, México State
3. Dalembertia populifolia Baill. - from Sonora to Oaxaca
4. Dalembertia triangularis Müll.Arg. - Guatemala, Chiapas, Oaxaca
