= Senefelderopsis =

Scientific classification
- Kingdom: Plantae
- Clade: Tracheophytes
- Clade: Angiosperms
- Clade: Eudicots
- Clade: Rosids
- Order: Malpighiales
- Family: Euphorbiaceae
- Subfamily: Euphorbioideae
- Tribe: Hippomaneae
- Subtribe: Hippomaninae
- Genus: Senefelderopsis; Steyerm.

Species
- Senefelderopsis chiribiquetensis (R.E.Schult. & Croizat) Steyerm.; Senefelderopsis croizatii Steyerm.

Genus of flowering plants

Senefelderopsis is a plant genus of the family Euphorbiaceae. It is native to southern tropical America, and found in Colombia, Guyana and Venezuela.

The genus was circumscribed by Julian Alfred Steyermark in Bot. Mus. Leafl. vol.15 on page 45 in 1951.

The genus name of Senefelderopsis is in honour of Johann Alois Senefelder (1771–1834), who was a German actor and playwright who invented the printing technique of lithography in the 1790s.

== Species ==
Two species are accepted.

- Senefelderopsis chiribiquetensis (R.E.Schult. & Croizat) Steyerm. – southeastern Colombia and southern Venezuela
- Senefelderopsis croizatii Steyerm. – southern Venezuela and Guyana
