= Conosapium =

Scientific classification
- Kingdom: Plantae
- Clade: Tracheophytes
- Clade: Angiosperms
- Clade: Eudicots
- Clade: Rosids
- Order: Malpighiales
- Family: Euphorbiaceae
- Subfamily: Euphorbioideae
- Tribe: Hippomaneae
- Subtribe: Hippomaninae
- Genus: Conosapium; Müll.Arg.
- Species: C. madagascariense

Binomial name
- Conosapium madagascariense Müll.Arg.

Synonyms
- Sapium madagascariense (Müll.Arg.) Pax

Genus of flowering plants

Conosapium is a plant genus of the family Euphorbiaceae first described as a genus in 1863. It contains only one known species, Conosapium madagascariense, which is endemic to Madagascar.
