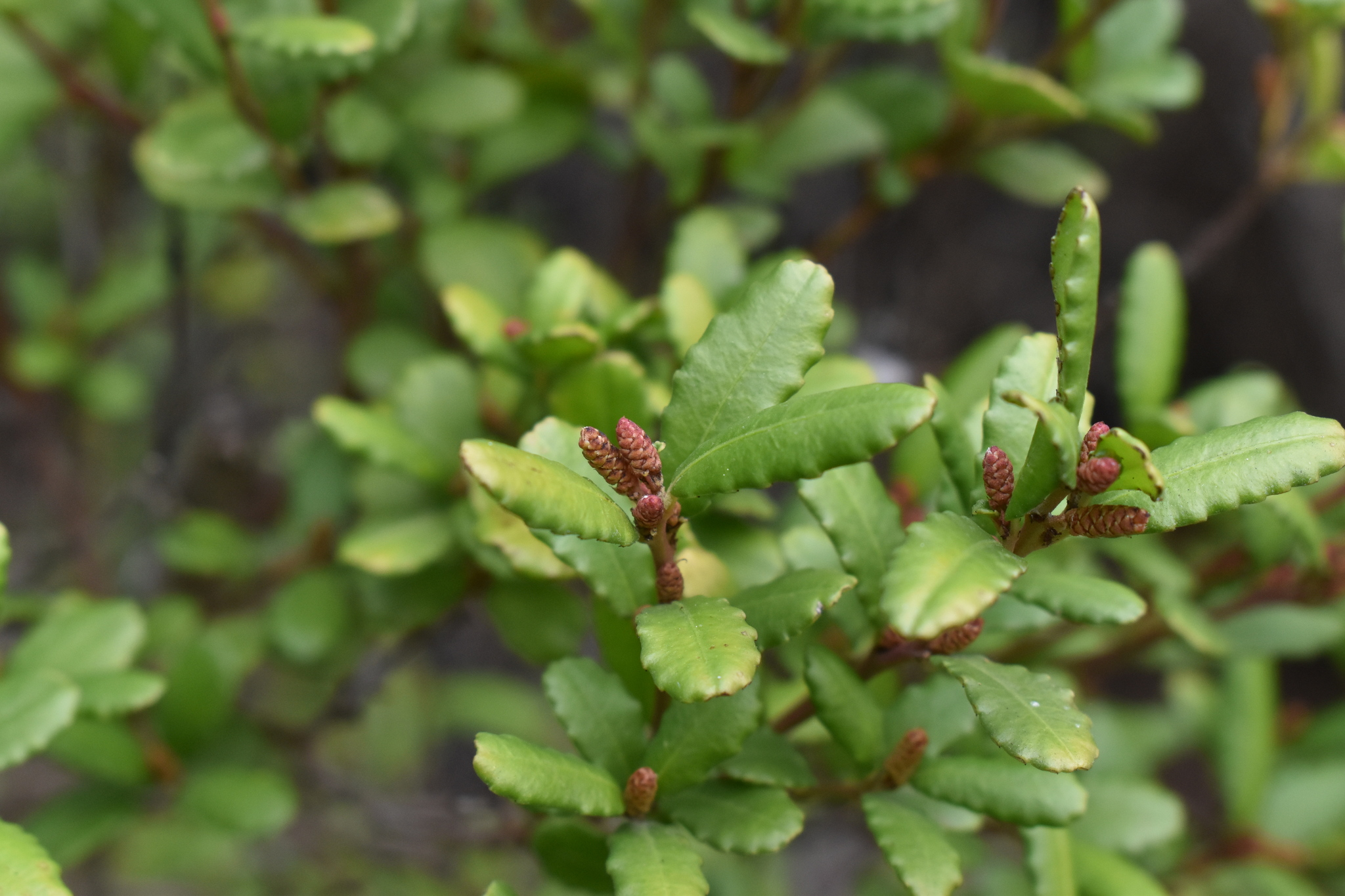

Scientific classification
- Kingdom: Plantae
- Clade: Tracheophytes
- Clade: Angiosperms
- Clade: Eudicots
- Clade: Rosids
- Order: Malpighiales
- Family: Euphorbiaceae
- Subfamily: Euphorbioideae
- Tribe: Hippomaneae
- Subtribe: Hippomaninae
- Genus: Adenopeltis; Bertero ex A.Juss.
- Species: A. serrata

Binomial name
- Adenopeltis serrata (W.T.Aiton) I.M.Johnst.

Synonyms
- Excoecaria serrata W.T.Aiton; Adenopeltis colliguaya Bertero ex A.Juss.; Excoecaria marginata Kunze ex Baill.; Stillingia glandulosa Dombey ex Baill.; Excoecaria colliguaya (Bertero ex A.Juss.) Baill.

= Adenopeltis =

Species of plant

Adenopeltis is a plant genus of the family Euphorbiaceae first described as a genus in 1832. Its name comes from Greek and means "glandular shield". It contains only one known species, Adenopeltis serrata, a shrub endemic to Chile. It is distributed from the Coquimbo to the Biobio regions.
