= Rhodothyrsus =

Scientific classification
- Kingdom: Plantae
- Clade: Tracheophytes
- Clade: Angiosperms
- Clade: Eudicots
- Clade: Rosids
- Order: Malpighiales
- Family: Euphorbiaceae
- Subfamily: Euphorbioideae
- Tribe: Hippomaneae
- Subtribe: Hippomaninae
- Genus: Rhodothyrsus; Esser

Genus of flowering plants

Rhodothyrsus is a plant genus of the family Euphorbiaceae, first described as a genus in 1999. It is native to South America.

Species

1. Rhodothyrsus hirsutus Esser - Colombia, NW Venezuela
2. Rhodothyrsus macrophyllus (Ducke) Esser - Guyana, Suriname, Colombia, Peru, N Brazil
