= Pleradenophora membranifolia =

Conservation status
- Least Concern (IUCN 3.1)

Scientific classification
- Kingdom: Plantae
- Clade: Tracheophytes
- Clade: Angiosperms
- Clade: Eudicots
- Clade: Rosids
- Order: Malpighiales
- Family: Euphorbiaceae
- Genus: Pleradenophora
- Species: P. membranifolia

Binomial name
- Pleradenophora membranifolia (Müll.Arg.) Esser & A.L.Melo

Synonyms
- Sapium rhombifolium Rusby; Sebastiania huallagensis Croizat; Sebastiania membranifolia Müll.Arg.; Sebastiania rhombifolia (Rusby) Jabl.

Species of plant

Pleradenophora membranifolia is a species of plant in the family Euphorbiaceae. It ranges from Peru to central Brazil.

Sebastiania huallagensis Croizat is treated as a synonym of P. membranifolia in Kew's Plants of the World Online database. The former, listed as endemic to Peru, was assessed as vulnerable on the IUCN Red List.
