= Senefelderplatz station =

Station of the Berlin U-Bahn

Coordinates: 52°31′56″N 13°24′45″E

Senefelderplatz
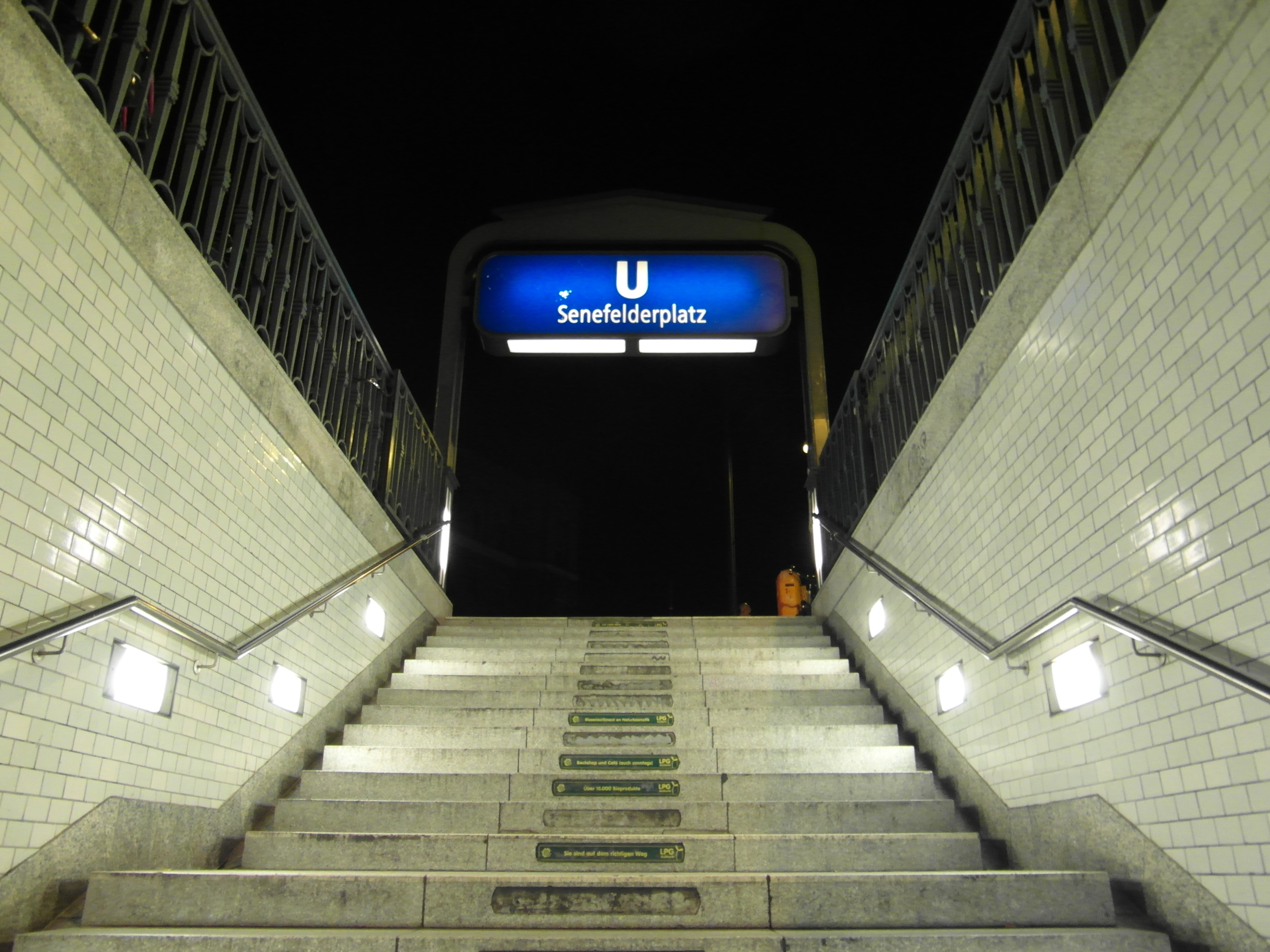
- 2012

General information
- Location: Schönhauser Allee/Metzer Straße; 10119 Berlin; Berlin; Germany
- Owner: BVG
- Operator: BVG
- Platforms: 1 island platform
- Tracks: 2
- Train operators: U-Bahn Berlin
- Connections: N2

Construction
- Structure type: Underground
- Parking: No
- Cycle facilities: Yes
- Accessible: Yes

Other information
- Station code: Sz
- Fare zone: VBB: Berlin A/5555

History
- Opened: 27 July 1913; 113 years ago

Services
Preceding station	Berlin U-Bahn	Following station
Rosa-Luxemburg-Platz towards Ruhleben	U2	Eberswalder Straße towards Pankow
Route map
Location
- Location within Berlin Location within Germany Location within Europe

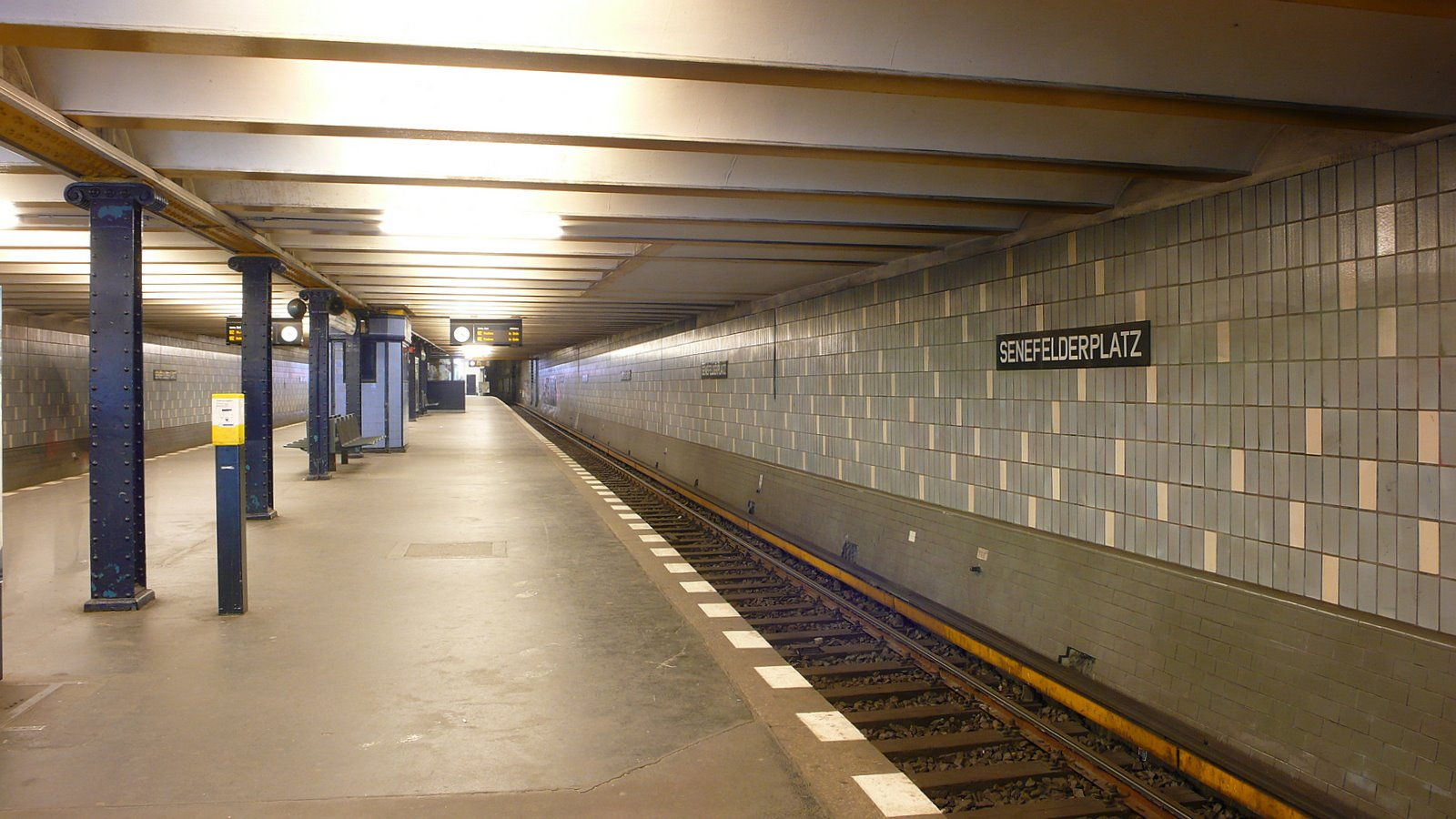
Platform of the station

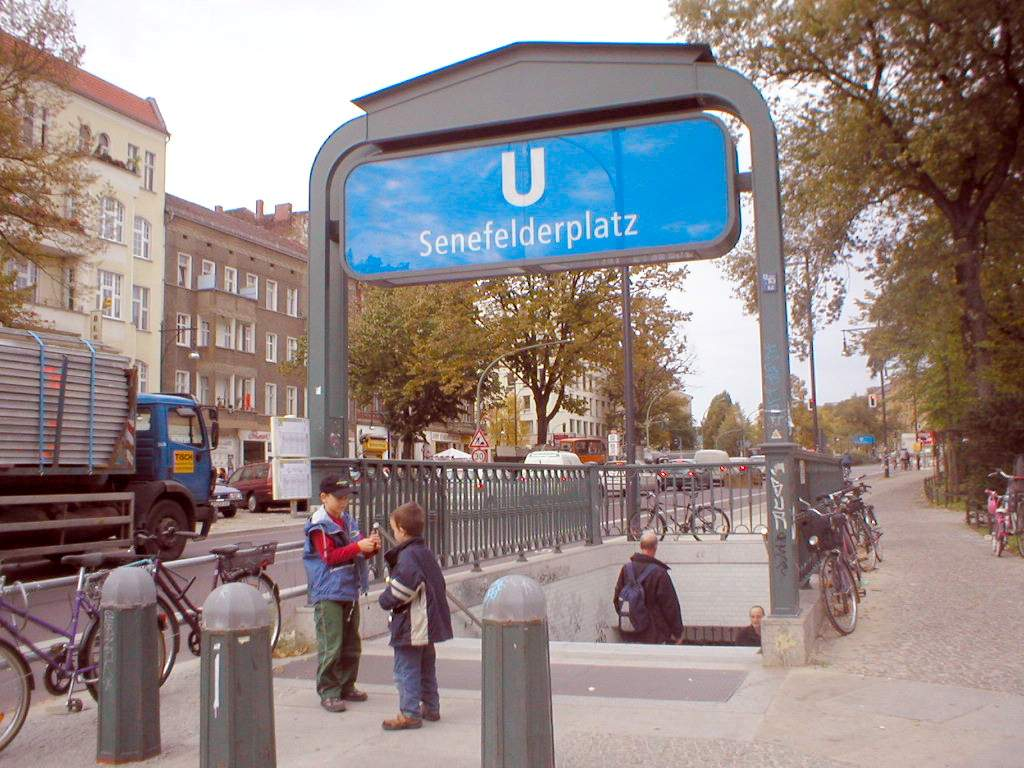
South entrance, Senefelderplatz U-Bahn station

Senefelderplatz is a Berlin U-Bahn station located on the U2 line.

The station is situated under Senefelderplatz, named after the inventor of the printing technique of lithography, Alois Senefelder.

The station was designed by Alfred Grenander and opened in 1913. The grey tiles on the walls are still not covered with advertisements. In November 1943, this station was heavily damaged twice - entrance and the ceiling penetration.
