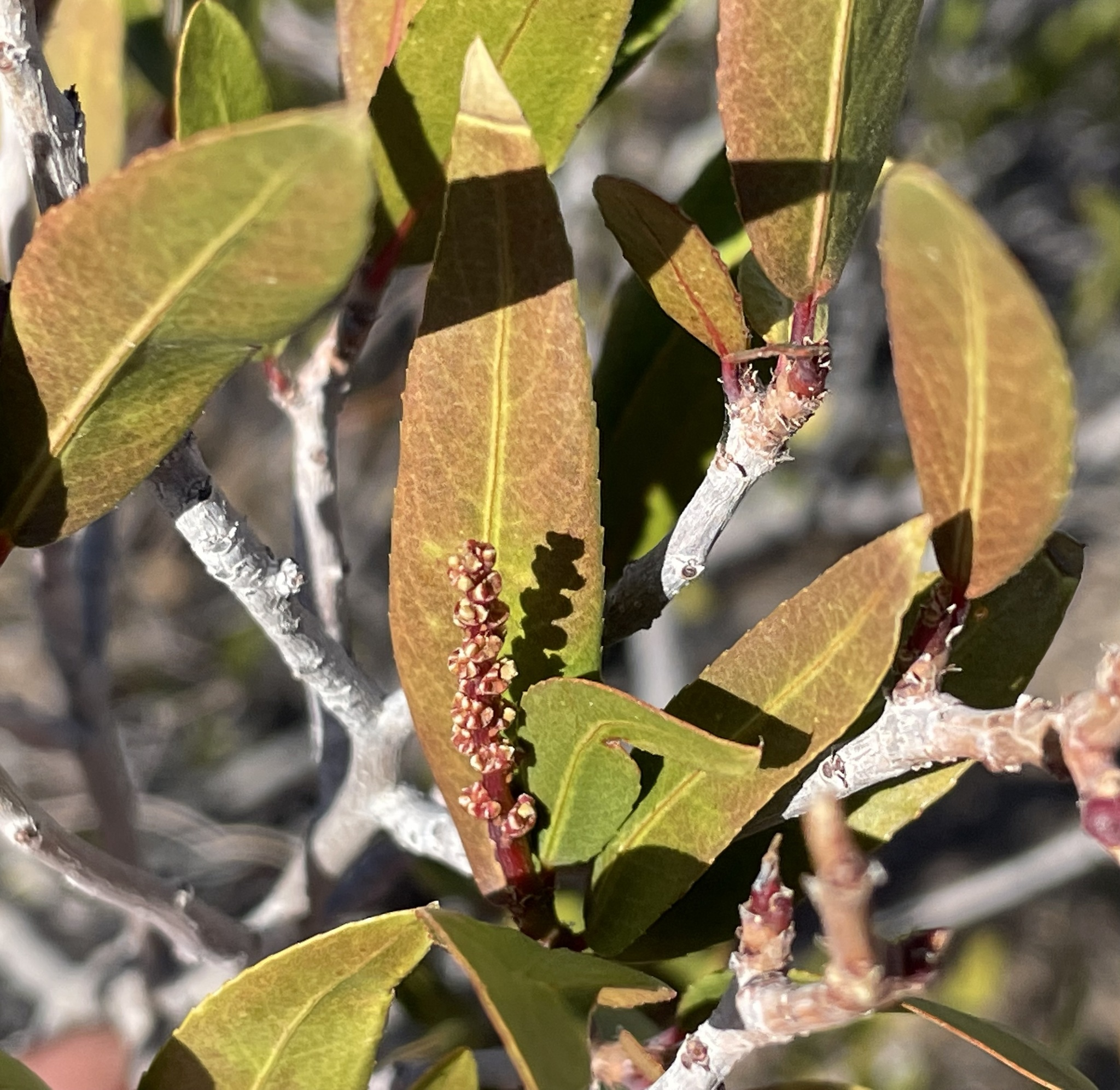
- Pleradenophora bilocularis

Scientific classification
- Kingdom: Plantae
- Clade: Tracheophytes
- Clade: Angiosperms
- Clade: Eudicots
- Clade: Rosids
- Order: Malpighiales
- Family: Euphorbiaceae
- Subfamily: Euphorbioideae
- Tribe: Hippomaneae
- Genus: Pleradenophora; Esser

= Pleradenophora =

Genus of flowering plants

Pleradenophora is a plant genus of the family Euphorbiaceae.

Species include:

- Pleradenophora bilocularis (S.Watson) Esser & A.L.Melo
- Pleradenophora lottiae (McVaugh) A.L.Melo & Esser
- Pleradenophora membranifolia (Müll.Arg.) Esser & A.L.Melo
- Pleradenophora tikalana (Lundell) A.L.Melo & Esser
- Pleradenophora tuerckheimiana (Pax & K.Hoffm.) A.L.Melo & Esser
