= Alois Senefelder =

German actor, playwright and inventor (1771–1834)

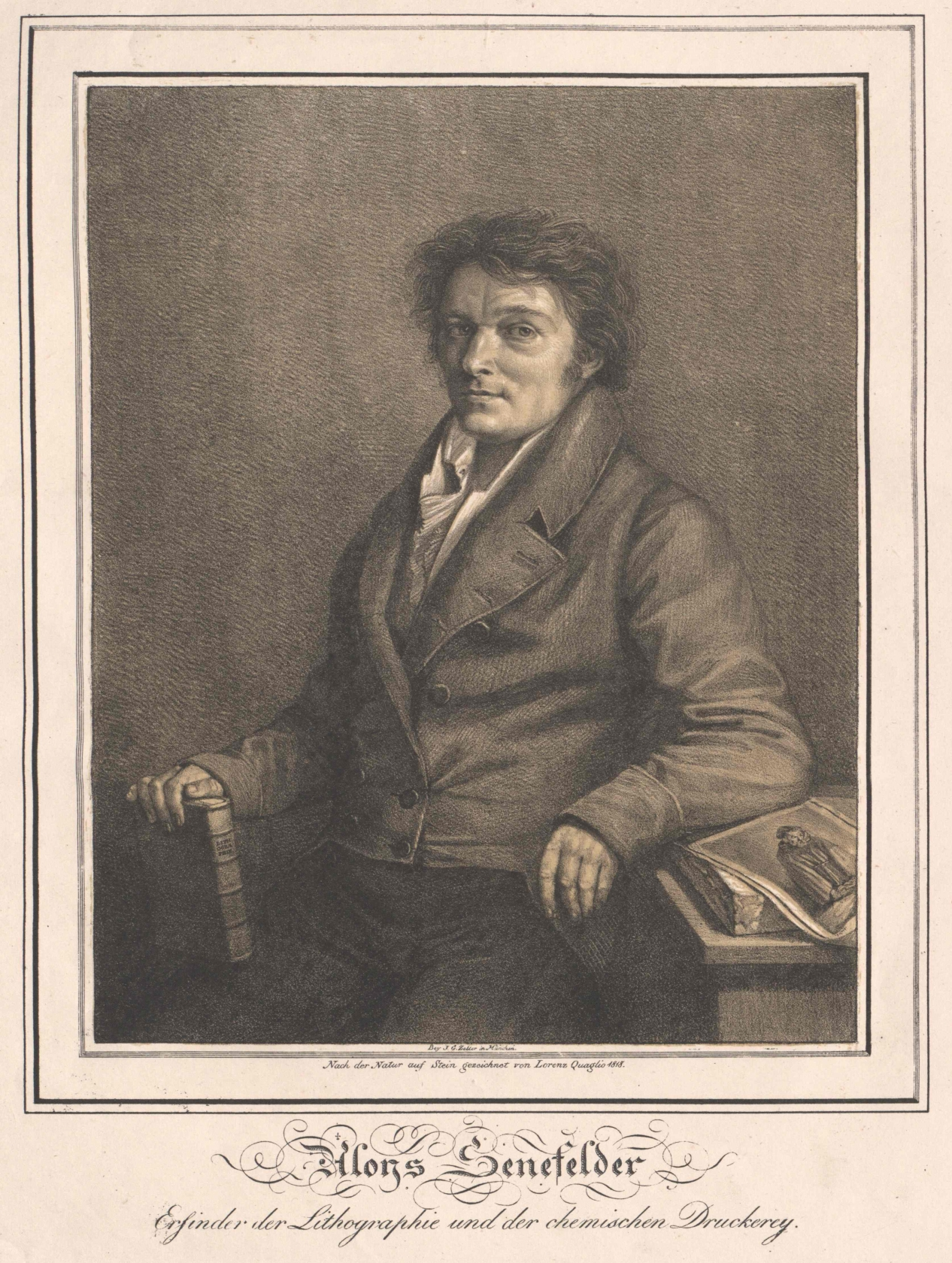
- Lithograph of Senefelder, from Specimens of Polyautography
- Born: Alois Johann Nepomuk Franz Senefelder; 6 November 1771; Prague, Kingdom of Bohemia
- Died: 26 February 1834 (aged 62); Munich, Kingdom of Bavaria
- Known for: Inventing lithography
- Parent: Peter Senefelder (father)

Johann Alois Senefelder (born Alois Johann Nepomuk Franz Senefelder; 6 November 1771 – 26 February 1834) was a German actor and playwright who invented the printing technique of lithography in the 1790s.

== Actor and playwright ==
Born Alois Johann Nepomuk Franz Senefelder in Prague, then capital of the Kingdom of Bohemia, where his actor father was appearing on stage. He was educated in Munich and won a scholarship to study law at Ingolstadt. The death of his father in 1791 forced him to leave his studies to support his mother and eight siblings, and he became an actor and wrote a successful play Connoisseur of Girls.

== Discovery and development of lithography ==
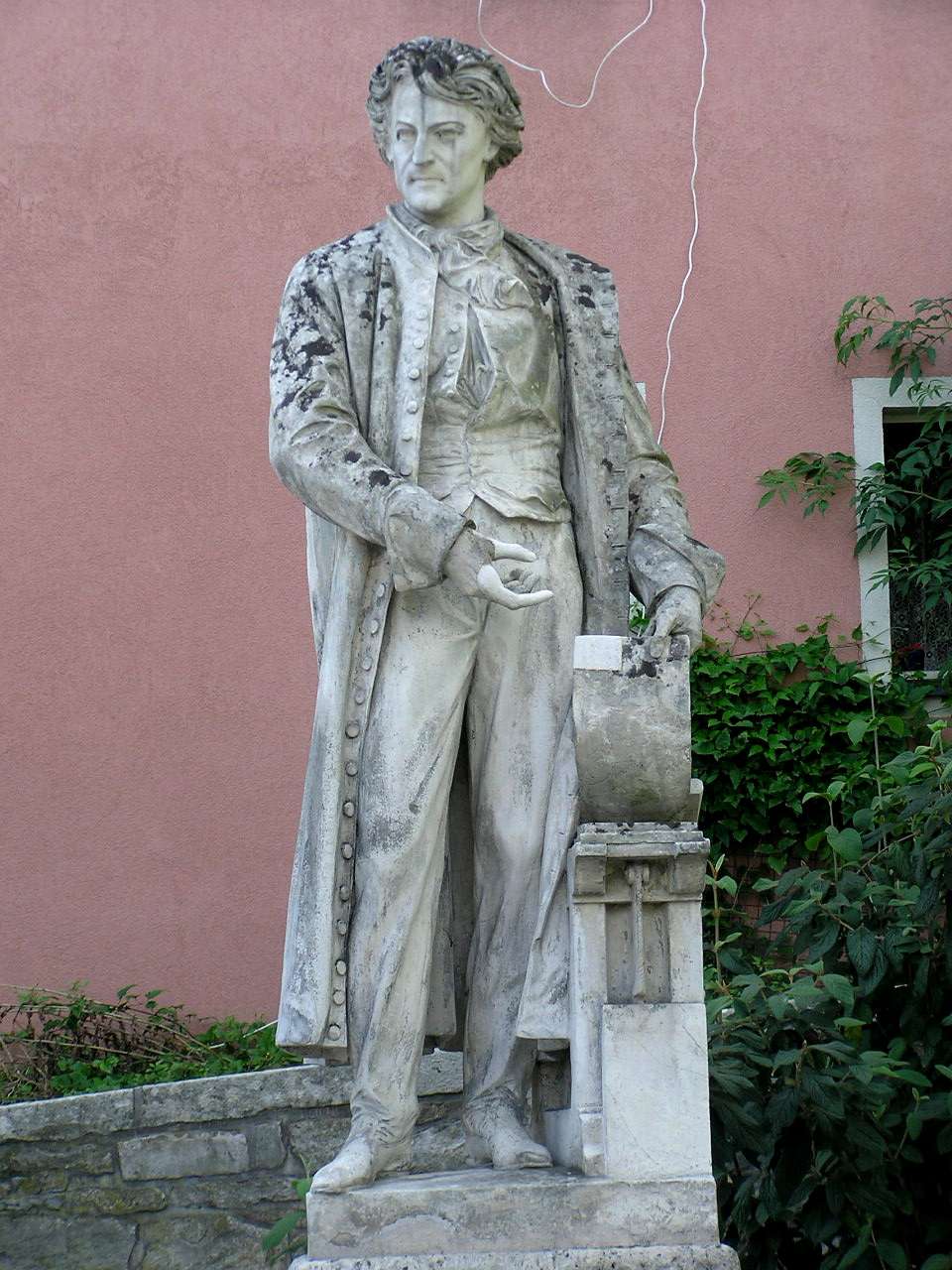
Monument to Alois Senefelder in Solnhofen

Problems with the printing of his play Mathilde von Altenstein caused him to fall into debt, and unable to afford to publish a new play he had written, Senefelder experimented with a novel etching technique using a greasy, acid resistant ink as a resist on a smooth fine-grained stone of Solnhofen limestone. He then discovered that this could be extended to allow printing from the flat surface of the stone alone, the first planographic process in printing.

He joined with the André family of music publishers and gradually brought his technique into a workable form, perfecting both the chemical processes and the special form of printing press required for using the stones. He called it "stone printing" or "chemical printing", but the French name "lithography" became more widely adopted. And with the composer Franz Gleißner he started a publishing firm in 1796 using lithography.

The value of the new cheap and exact reproduction process was recognized early by land surveying offices across Europe. Senefelder was appointed 1809 to be the Inspector of a new Institution set up for this purpose in Bavaria called the "Lithographic Institute" (Lithographische Anstalt) in Munich. Similar Institutions were subsequently set up under his supervision in Berlin, Paris, London and Vienna.

He secured patent rights across Europe and publicized his findings in 1818 in Vollstandiges Lehrbuch der Steindruckerei which was translated in 1819 into French and English. A Complete Course of Lithography combined Senefelder's history of his own invention with a practical guide to lithography, and remained in print as recently as 1977 (Da Capo Press).

Senefelder was also able to exploit the potential of lithography as a medium for art. Unlike previous printmaking techniques, such as engraving, that required advanced craft skills, lithography facilitated greater accuracy and textural variety, because the artist could now draw directly onto the plate with familiar pens. As early as 1803 André published in London a portfolio of artists lithographs, entitled Specimens of Polyautography.

In 1837, lithography had been further developed to allow full colour printing from multiple plates, and chromolithography was the most important technique in colour printing until the introduction of process colour.

== Awards and legacy ==
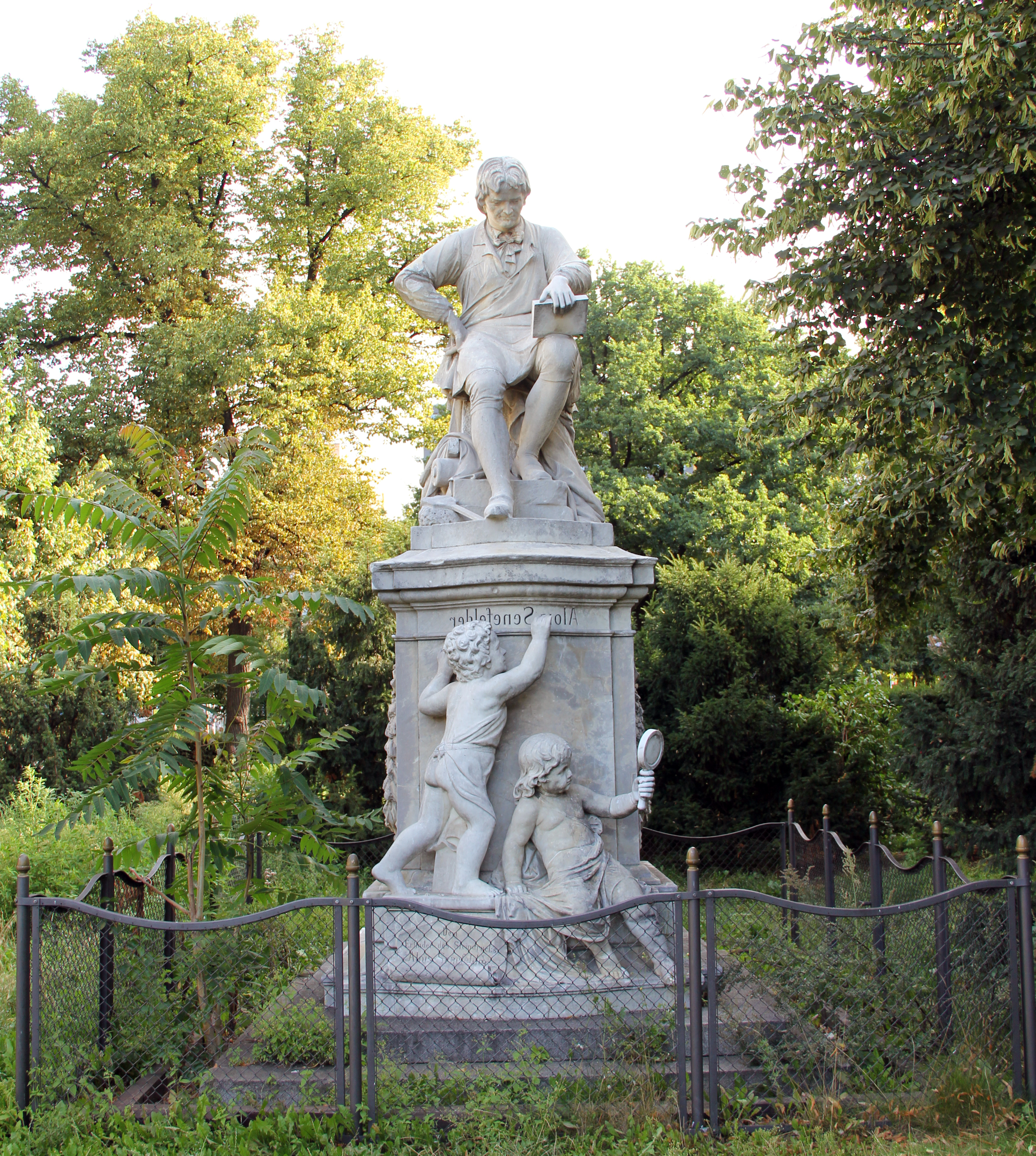
Marble statue (Rudolf Pohle, 1892) of Alois Senefelder located at Senefelderplatz, Berlin. The statue honors Senefelder's invention of lithography. Senefelder's name is written in mirror-reversed lettering, which is used in lithography. One of the two children (putti) is looking at the lettering using a hand mirror, which shows the lettering unreversed.

Senefelder was decorated by King Maximilian Joseph of Bavaria and a statue of him stands in the town of Solnhofen, where lithographic stone is still quarried. A statue of Alois Senefelder by sculptor Rudolf Pohle was erected in 1892 in what was then known as Thusneldaplatz in Berlin. The name of the square was changed to Senefelderplatz in 1894. An U-Bahn station named Senefelderplatz was opened in 1913.

Alois Senefelder's contribution ranks alongside William Ged's invention of stereotyping, Friedrich Koenig's steam press and Ottmar Mergenthaler's linotype machine in its innovative effect. It made printing more affordable and available to more people, and was important in art and newspaper printing. Senefelder lived to see his process become widely adopted both for art printmaking and as the dominant method of pictorial reproduction in the printing industry. He died in Munich, where he is buried in the Alter Südfriedhof.

Several plant taxa have been named after him as well. The genus of Senefeldera Mart. 1841 (in the Euphorbiaceae family) and of Senefelderopsis Steyerm. 1951 (Euphorbiaceae).

== See also ==
- Johann André
- List of German inventors and discoverers
