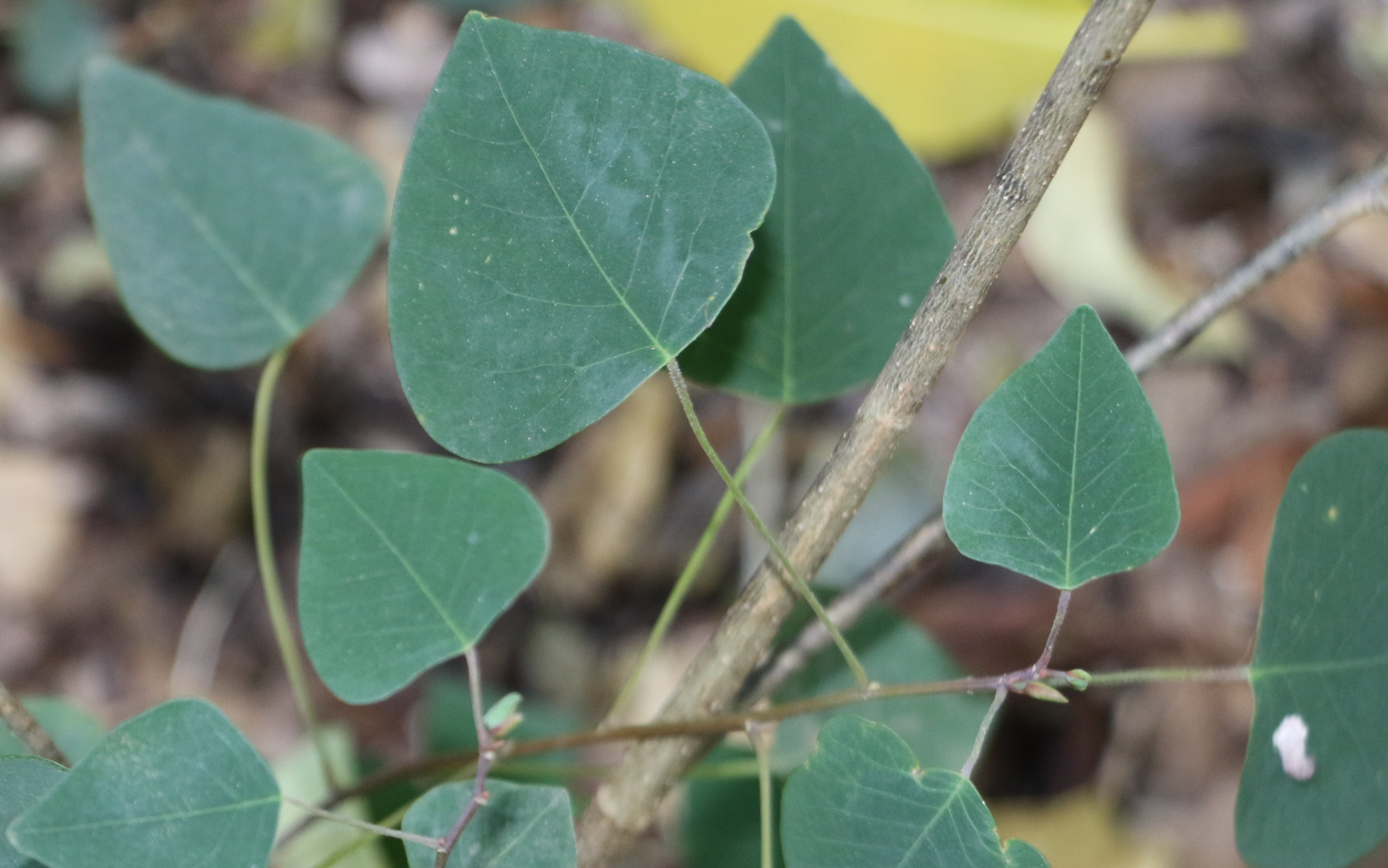

Scientific classification
- Kingdom: Plantae
- Clade: Tracheophytes
- Clade: Angiosperms
- Clade: Eudicots
- Clade: Rosids
- Order: Malpighiales
- Family: Euphorbiaceae
- Genus: Homalanthus
- Species: H. stillingiifolius

Binomial name
- Homalanthus stillingiifolius F.Muell.

= Homalanthus stillingiifolius =

Species of flowering plant

Homalanthus stillingiifolius is an Australian shrub in the spurge family (Euphorbiaceae). Mostly found in rocky areas in eucalyptus forests, it is occasionally seen on the margins of rainforests.
