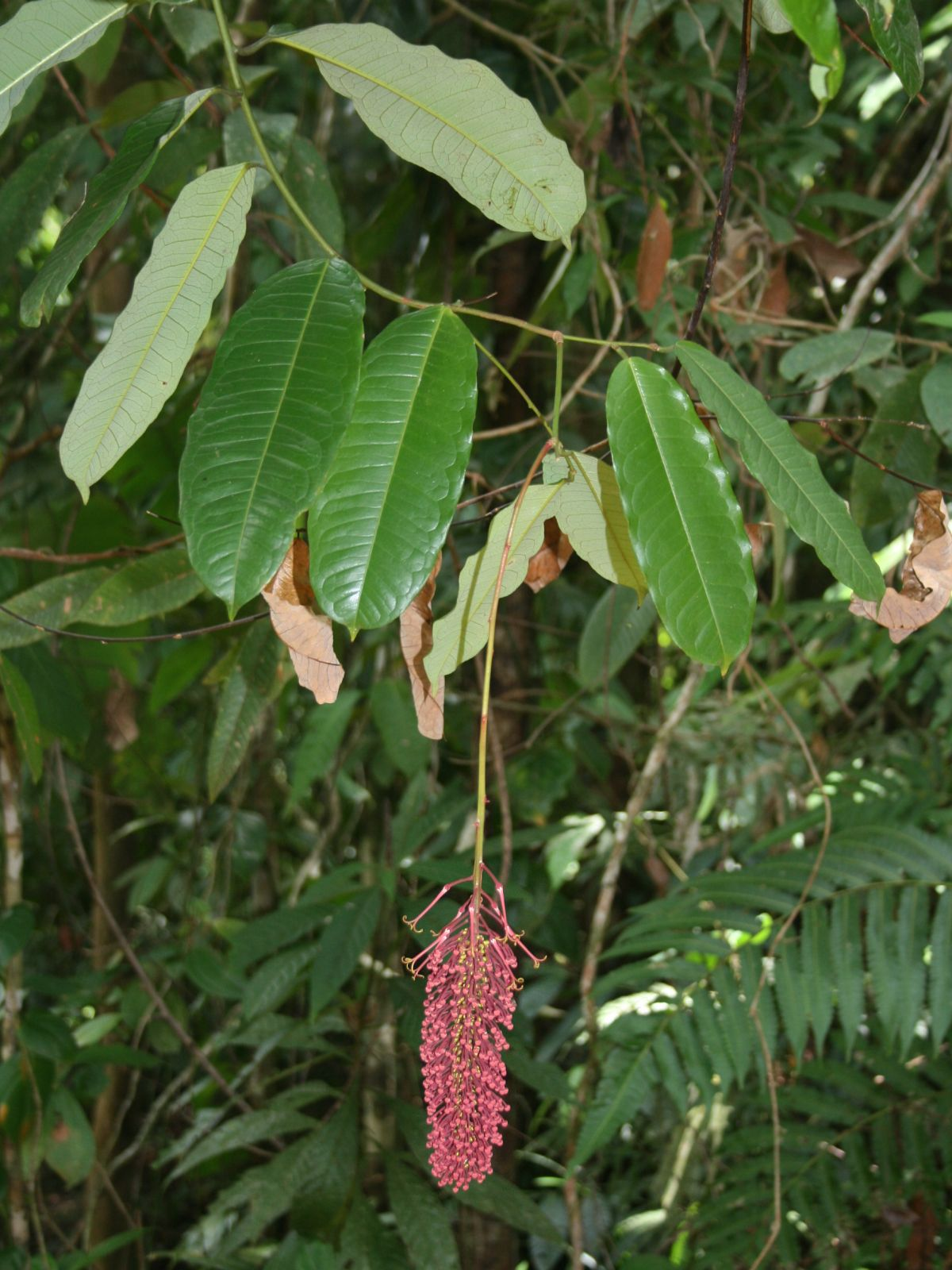
- Mabea occidentalis

Scientific classification
- Kingdom: Plantae
- Clade: Tracheophytes
- Clade: Angiosperms
- Clade: Eudicots
- Clade: Rosids
- Order: Malpighiales
- Family: Euphorbiaceae
- Subfamily: Euphorbioideae
- Tribe: Hippomaneae
- Subtribe: Hippomaninae
- Genus: Mabea; Aubl.

Type species
- Mabea piriri Aubl.

= Mabea (plant) =

Genus of flowering plants

Mabea is a plant genus of the family Euphorbiaceae first described in 1775. It is native to Central and South America as well as Mexico and Trinidad.

== Species ==
Below is a list of the 39 accepted species of Mabea.

1. Mabea anadena - Peru, Bolivia, B Amazonas
2. Mabea angularis - Guyana, Peru, N Brazil
3. Mabea angustifolia - Peru, Bolivia, Brazil
4. Mabea anomala - Colombia, Venezuela, N Brazil
5. Mabea arenicola - Amazon Basin
6. Mabea biglandulosa - Mount Roraima, Roraima
7. Mabea caudata - Guyana, Suriname
8. Mabea chocoensis - Colombia
9. Mabea elata - Ecuador, Peru
10. Mabea elegans - Bolivia, B Amazonas
11. Mabea excelsa - Veracruz, Chiapas, Central America
12. Mabea fistulifera - Brazil, Bolivia, Paraguay
13. Mabea frutescens - SE Colombia, V Amazonas
14. Mabea gaudichaudiana - São Paulo
15. Mabea glaziovii - NE Brazil
16. Mabea jefensis - Panama
17. Mabea klugii - from Nicaragua to Peru
18. Mabea linearifolia - V Amazonas
19. Mabea longibracteata - V Amazonas, B Amazonas
20. Mabea macbridei - Colombia, Ecuador, Peru
21. Mabea macrocalyx - Venezuela
22. Mabea montana - Central America, NW South America, Trinidad
23. Mabea nitida NW South America, Belize
24. Mabea occidentalis - from C Mexico to C Brazil
25. Mabea ovata - Pará
26. Mabea paniculata - Pará, Mato Grosso, La Paz, Paraguay
27. Mabea piriri - from Costa Rica to Brazil
28. Mabea pohliana - Brazil, Bolivia
29. Mabea pulcherrima - N + NW South America
30. Mabea rubicunda - Pakaraima
31. Mabea salicoides B Amazonas, Fr Guiana
32. Mabea speciosa - N + NW South America
33. Mabea standleyi - Colombia, Ecuador, Peru, Acre
34. Mabea subserrulata - B Amazonas
35. Mabea subsessilis - Amazon Basin
36. Mabea taquari - Trinidad, NE South America
37. Mabea tenorioi - Oaxaca
38. Mabea trianae - Colombia, Venezuela
39. Mabea uleana - B Amazonas
