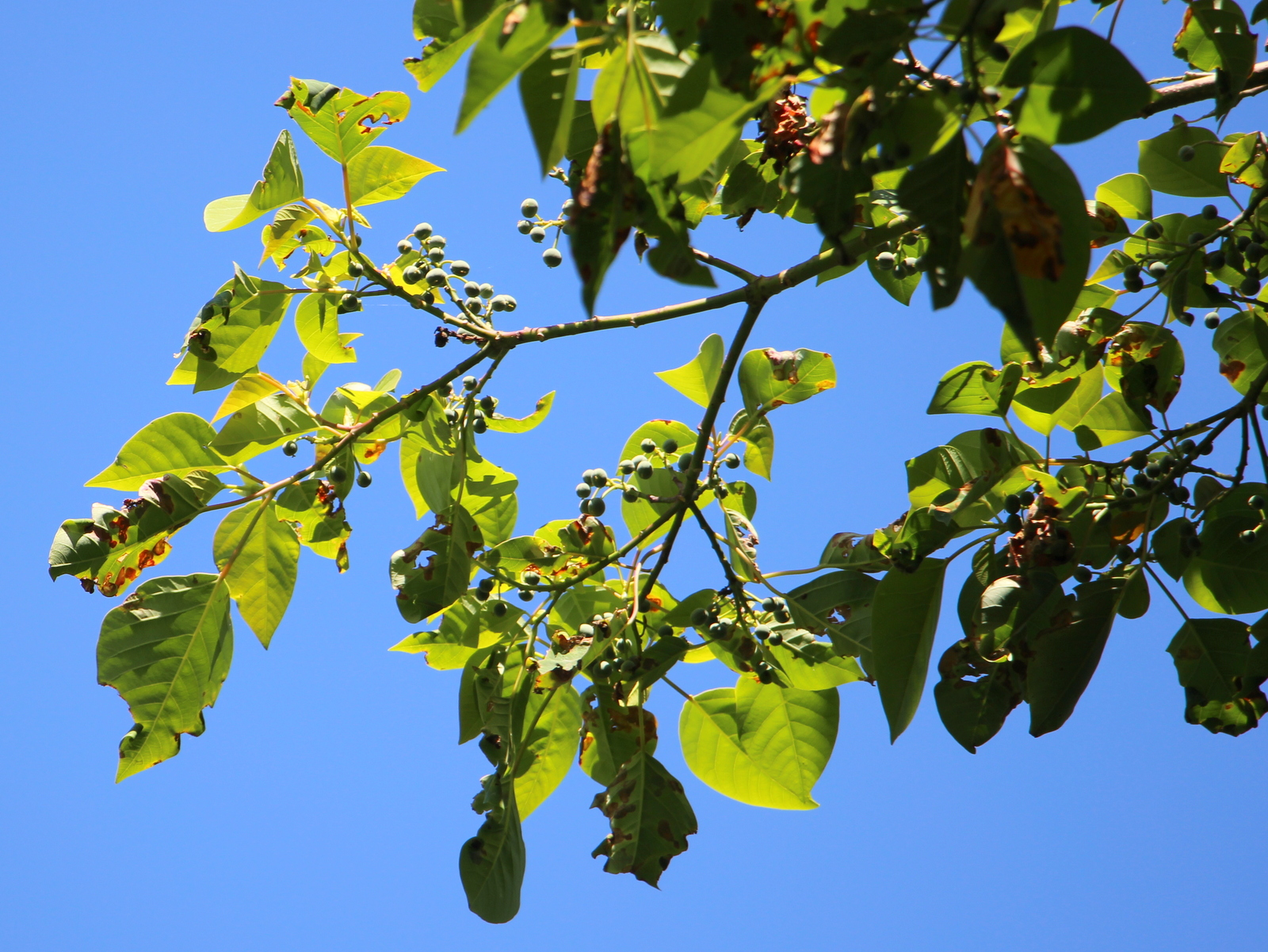

Scientific classification
- Kingdom: Plantae
- Clade: Tracheophytes
- Clade: Angiosperms
- Clade: Eudicots
- Clade: Rosids
- Order: Malpighiales
- Family: Euphorbiaceae
- Genus: Homalanthus
- Species: H. novoguineensis

Binomial name
- Homalanthus novoguineensis (Warb.) K.Schum.

Synonyms
- Carumbium novoguineense Warb.; Homalanthus beguinii J. J. Smith; Homalanthus brachystachys Pax & J. Hoffm.; Homalanthus crinitus Gage; Homalanthus elegans Gage; Homalanthus novo-guinensis (Warb.) K. Schum; Homalanthus pachystylus Airy Shaw; Homalanthus tetrandrus J.J. Sm.

= Homalanthus novoguineensis =

Species of plant

Homalanthus novoguineensis is a shrub or small tree in the spurge family (Euphorbiaceae). Mostly found in Australia and nearby tropical islands in disturbed areas near rainforest.
