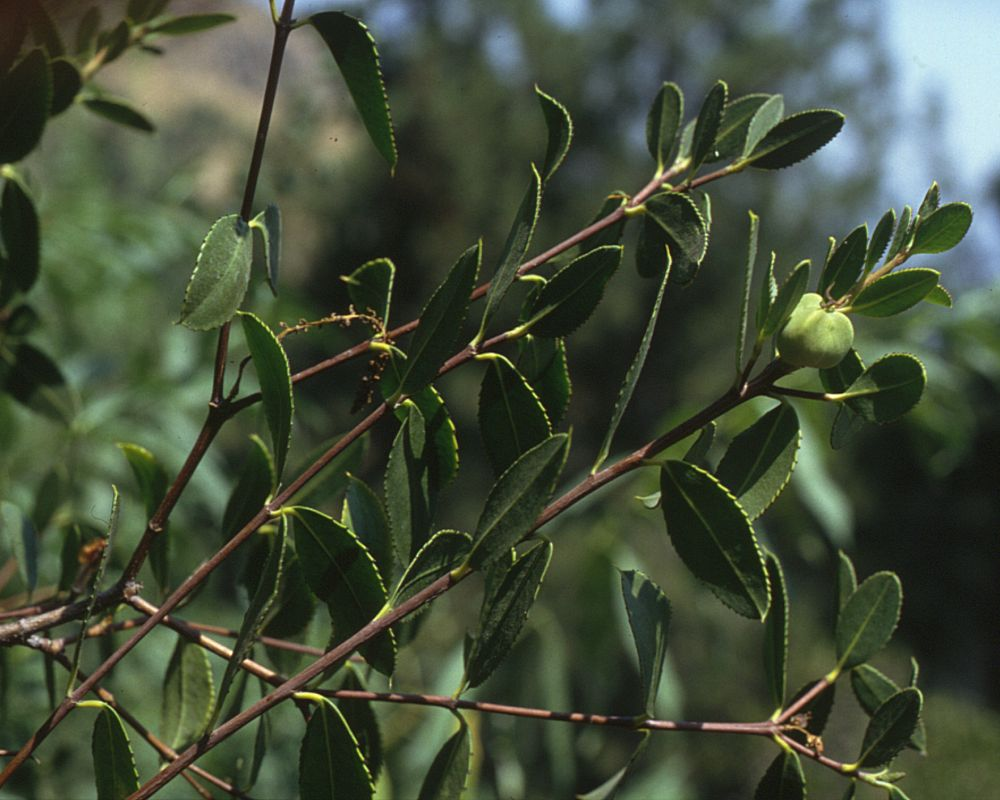

Scientific classification
- Kingdom: Plantae
- Clade: Tracheophytes
- Clade: Angiosperms
- Clade: Eudicots
- Clade: Rosids
- Order: Malpighiales
- Family: Euphorbiaceae
- Genus: Colliguaja
- Species: C. odorifera

Binomial name
- Colliguaja odorifera Molina

= Colliguaja odorifera =

Species of flowering plant

Colliguaja odorifera is a lignotuberous species of the family Euphorbiaceae. Occurrence is in portions of South America, specifically in the Chilean matorral, where it can be found on both south and north-facing slopes. Each of these slopes have different air and soil moisture levels as well as different amounts of sunlight exposure, to which the shrub is able to adapt. Its specific occurrence is noted in central Chile in the La Campana National Park and Cerro La Campana areas, where this lignotuber is found in the same forest as the endangered Chilean Wine Palm.
