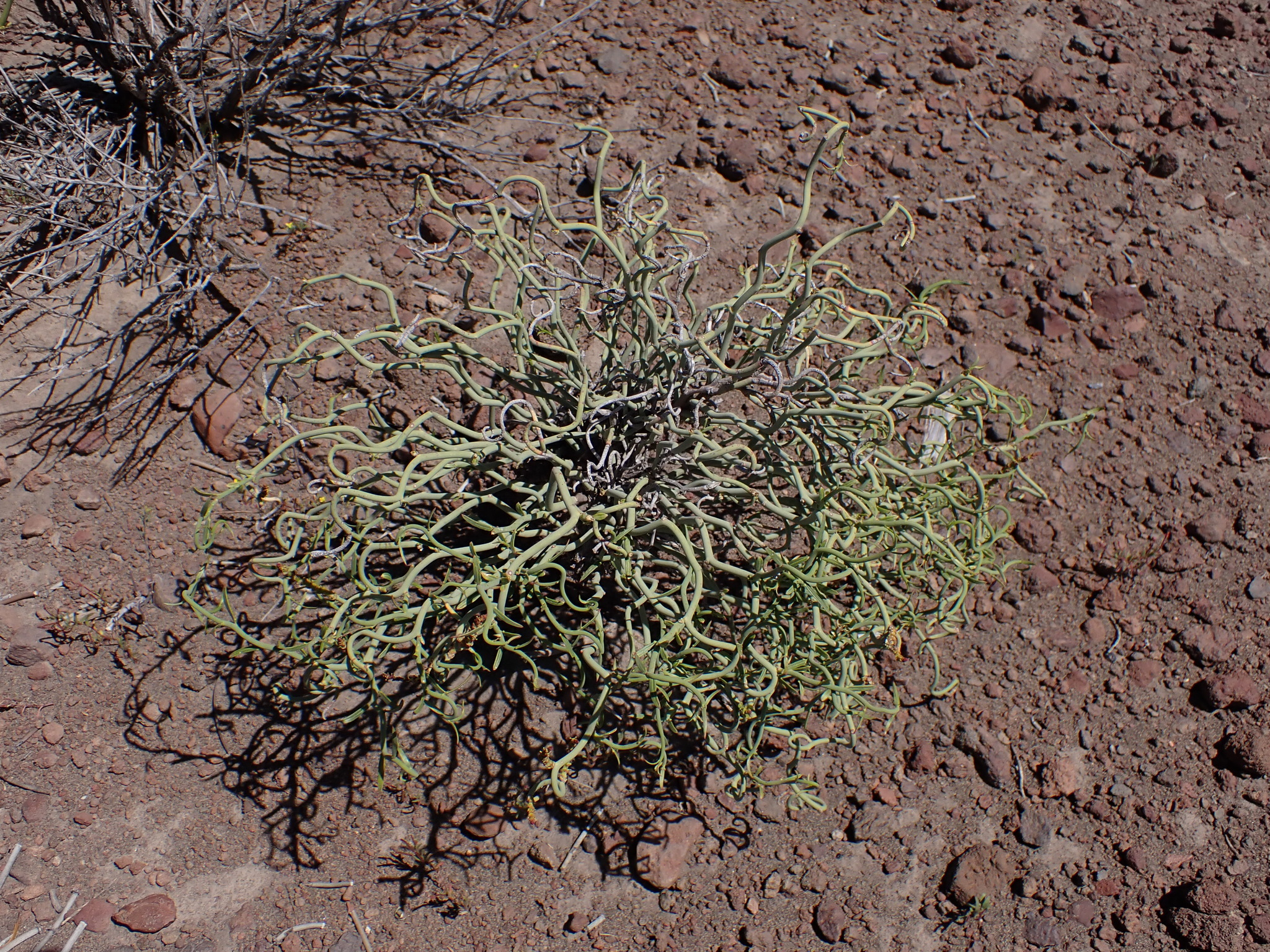

Scientific classification
- Kingdom: Plantae
- Clade: Tracheophytes
- Clade: Angiosperms
- Clade: Eudicots
- Clade: Rosids
- Order: Malpighiales
- Family: Euphorbiaceae
- Subfamily: Euphorbioideae
- Tribe: Hippomaneae
- Subtribe: Hippomaninae
- Genus: Spegazziniophytum; Esser
- Species: S. patagonicum

Binomial name
- Spegazziniophytum patagonicum (Speg.)Esser

Synonyms
- Colliguaja patagonica Speg.; Sapium patagonicum (Speg.) D.J.Rogers; Spirostachys patagonica Griseb.; Stillingia patagonica (Speg.) Pax & K.Hoffm.

= Spegazziniophytum =

Genus of flowering plants

Spegazziniophytum is a genus of plants in the family Euphorbiaceae first described in 2001. It contains only one known species, Spegazziniophytum patagonicum, which is endemic to Argentina (Provinces of Mendoza, Neuquén, Chubut, Santa Cruz).
