= Dendrocousinsia alpina =

Conservation status
- Vulnerable (IUCN 2.3)

Scientific classification
- Kingdom: Plantae
- Clade: Tracheophytes
- Clade: Angiosperms
- Clade: Eudicots
- Clade: Rosids
- Order: Malpighiales
- Family: Euphorbiaceae
- Genus: Dendrocousinsia
- Species: D. alpina

Binomial name
- Dendrocousinsia alpina Fawc. & Rendle

Synonyms
- Sebastiania alpina (Fawc. & Rendle) Pax & K.Hoffm.

Species of flowering plant

Dendrocousinsia alpina is a species of plant in the family Euphorbiaceae. It is endemic to eastern Jamaica.
