= Balakata luzonica =

Scientific classification
- Kingdom: Plantae
- Clade: Tracheophytes
- Clade: Angiosperms
- Clade: Eudicots
- Clade: Rosids
- Order: Malpighiales
- Family: Euphorbiaceae
- Genus: Balakata
- Species: B. luzonica

Binomial name
- Balakata luzonica (Vidal) Esser

Synonyms
- Sapium luzonicum Sapium merrillianum

Species of flowering plant

Balakata luzonica is a species of flowering plant in the family Euphorbiaceae. It is distributed from the Philippines to New Guinea.
