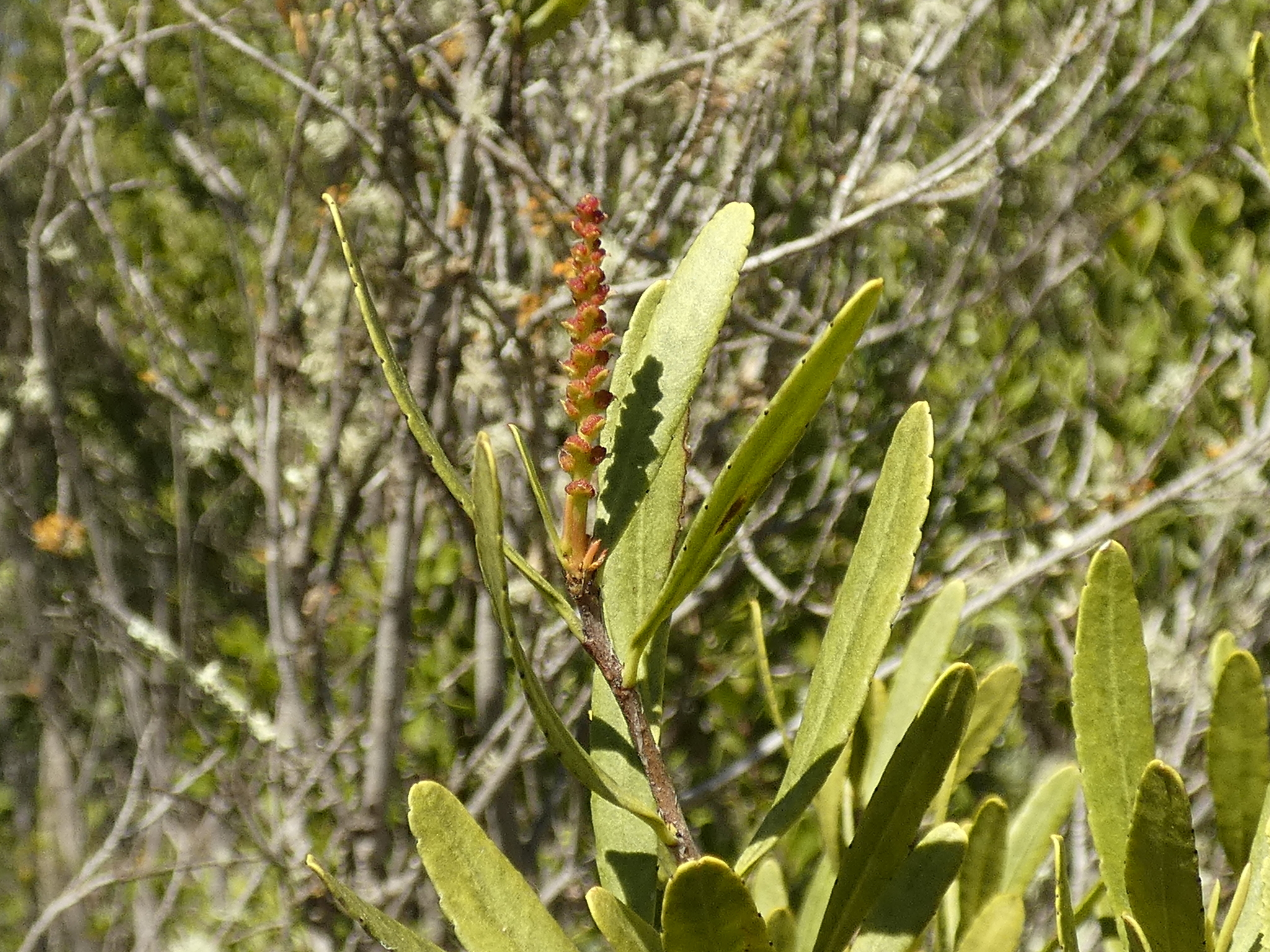

Scientific classification
- Kingdom: Plantae
- Clade: Tracheophytes
- Clade: Angiosperms
- Clade: Eudicots
- Clade: Rosids
- Order: Malpighiales
- Family: Euphorbiaceae
- Genus: Colliguaja
- Species: C. dombeyana

Binomial name
- Colliguaja dombeyana A.Juss.

= Colliguaja dombeyana =

Species of plant

Colliguaja dombeyana is a species of flowering plant in the family Euphorbiaceae. It is a shrub endemic to Central Chile.
