= Dendrocousinsia fasciculata =

Conservation status
- Endangered (IUCN 2.3)

Scientific classification
- Kingdom: Plantae
- Clade: Tracheophytes
- Clade: Angiosperms
- Clade: Eudicots
- Clade: Rosids
- Order: Malpighiales
- Family: Euphorbiaceae
- Genus: Dendrocousinsia
- Species: D. fasciculata

Binomial name
- Dendrocousinsia fasciculata Millsp.

Synonyms
- Sebastiania fasciculata (Millsp.) Pax & K.Hoffm.

Species of flowering plant

Dendrocousinsia fasciculata is a species of plant in the family Euphorbiaceae. It is a shrub or tree endemic to western and central Jamaica.
