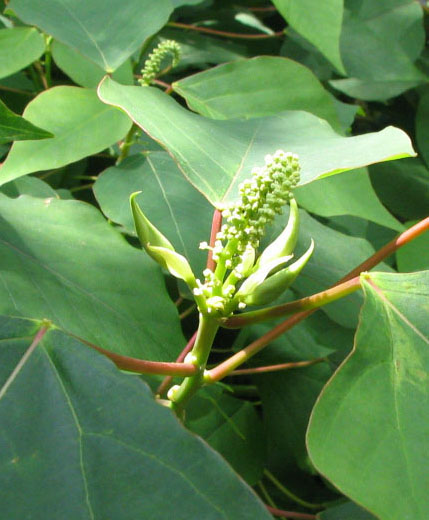
- Bleeding-heart tree (Homalanthus populifolius)

Scientific classification
- Kingdom: Plantae
- Clade: Embryophytes
- Clade: Tracheophytes
- Clade: Spermatophytes
- Clade: Angiosperms
- Clade: Eudicots
- Clade: Rosids
- Order: Malpighiales
- Family: Euphorbiaceae
- Subfamily: Euphorbioideae
- Tribe: Hippomaneae
- Subtribe: Carumbiinae
- Genus: Homalanthus; A.Juss.

Synonyms
- Carumbium Reinw.; Dibrachion Regel; Duania Noronha; Garumbium Blume; Omalanthus A.Juss.; Wartmannia Müll.Arg.

= Homalanthus =

Genus of flowering plants

Homalanthus is a genus of plants in the family Euphorbiaceae, first described in 1824. It is the only genus in the subtribe Carumbiinae. It is native to mainland Southeast Asia, Malesia, Papuasia, northern and eastern Australia, and various islands in the Pacific.

When published, the generic name was spelt as Omalanthus. Since the name comes from the ancient Greek word homalos meaning 'smooth' and anthos meaning 'flower', this original spelling was inconsistent with the general Greek transliteration rules, and many later authors changed it to Homalanthus. According to the International Code of Nomenclature for algae, fungi, and plants, Homalanthus has now been conserved against the original Omalanthus.

== Species ==
As of July 2024, Plants of the World Online recognises 23 species in this genus, as follows:

- Homalanthus acuminatus - Samoa
- Homalanthus arfakiensis - Maluku, West New Guinea
- Homalanthus caloneurus - Brunei, Sabah
- Homalanthus ebracteatua - Vanuatu
- Homalanthus fastuosus - Orchid Island, Philippines
- Homalanthus giganteus - Java, Lesser Sunda Islands
- Homalanthus grandifolius - Sumatra, Borneo
- Homalanthus longipes - Vanuatu
- Homalanthus longistylus - Papua New Guinea, Bismarck Archipelago
- Homalanthus macradenius - Philippines
- Homalanthus nervosus - New Guinea
- Homalanthus novoguineensis- Papua New Guinea, Bismarck Archipelago, Solomon Islands, Maluku, Lesser Sunda Islands, the Northern Territory, Queensland, Western Australia
- Homalanthus nutans- many Pacific Islands
- Homalanthus polyadenius - Papua New Guinea
- Homalanthus polyandrus - Kermadec Islands
- Homalanthus populifolius - Papua New Guinea, Bismarck Archipelago, Solomon Islands, Norfolk Island, Lord Howe Island, New South Wales, Queensland, Victoria
- Homalanthus populneus - Thailand, Malaysia, Indonesia, Philippines
- Homalanthus remotus - West New Guinea
- Homalanthus repandus - New Caledonia, Loyalty Islands
- Homalanthus schlechteri - New Caledonia, Loyalty Islands
- Homalanthus stillingiifolius - New South Wales, Queensland
- Homalanthus stokesii - Rapa-Iti
- Homalanthus trivalvis - Solomon Islands
