= Shirakiopsis trilocularis =

Conservation status
- Endangered (IUCN 3.1)

Scientific classification
- Kingdom: Plantae
- Clade: Tracheophytes
- Clade: Angiosperms
- Clade: Eudicots
- Clade: Rosids
- Order: Malpighiales
- Family: Euphorbiaceae
- Genus: Shirakiopsis
- Species: S. trilocularis

Binomial name
- Shirakiopsis trilocularis (Pax & K.Hoffm.) Esser

Synonyms
- Sapium triloculare Pax & K.Hoffm.; Shirakia trilocularis (Pax & K.Hoffm.) Kruijt

Species of flowering plant

Shirakiopsis trilocularis is a species of flowering plant in the family Euphorbiaceae. It is native to Tanzania.
