= Homalanthus stokesii =

Conservation status
- Near Threatened (IUCN 2.3)

Scientific classification
- Kingdom: Plantae
- Clade: Tracheophytes
- Clade: Angiosperms
- Clade: Eudicots
- Clade: Rosids
- Order: Malpighiales
- Family: Euphorbiaceae
- Genus: Homalanthus
- Species: H. stokesii

Binomial name
- Homalanthus stokesii F.Br. (1935)

Species of flowering plant

Homalanthus stokesii is a species of plant in the family Euphorbiaceae. It is endemic to the island of Rapa Iti in the Tubuai Islands of French Polynesia.
