= Shirakiopsis aubrevillei =

Conservation status
- Vulnerable (IUCN 2.3)

Scientific classification
- Kingdom: Plantae
- Clade: Tracheophytes
- Clade: Angiosperms
- Clade: Eudicots
- Clade: Rosids
- Order: Malpighiales
- Family: Euphorbiaceae
- Genus: Shirakiopsis
- Species: S. aubrevillei

Binomial name
- Shirakiopsis aubrevillei (Leandri) Esser

Synonyms
- Sapium aubrevillei Leandri; Shirakia aubrevillei (Leandri) Kruijt

Species of flowering plant

Shirakiopsis aubrevillei (syn. Sapium aubrevillei) is a species of flowering plant in the family Euphorbiaceae. It is native to Ivory Coast and Ghana, where it grows in wet forest habitat. It is threatened by habitat destruction from mining, logging, and tree plantations.
