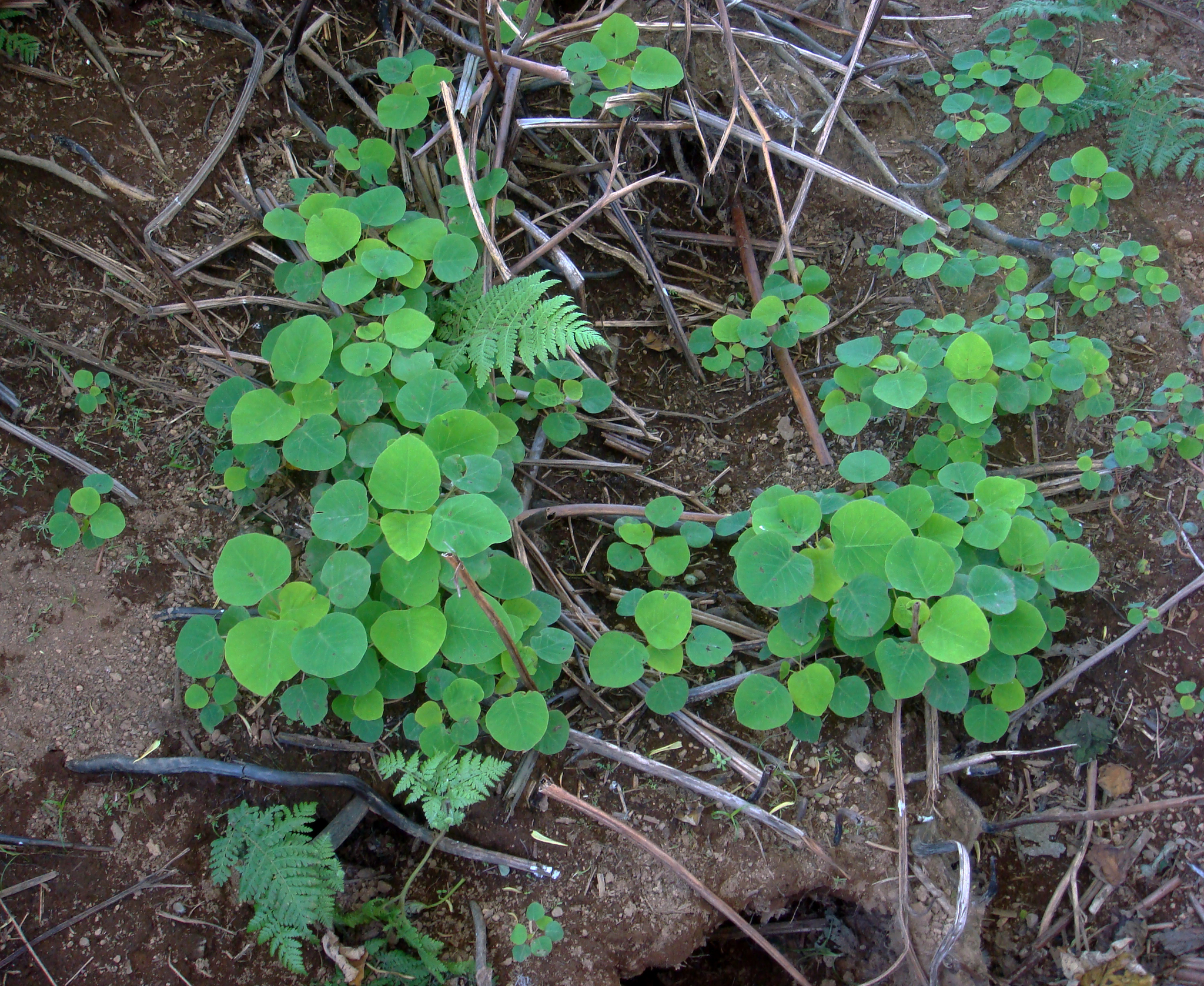

Conservation status
- Vulnerable (IUCN 2.3)

Scientific classification
- Kingdom: Plantae
- Clade: Tracheophytes
- Clade: Angiosperms
- Clade: Eudicots
- Clade: Rosids
- Order: Malpighiales
- Family: Euphorbiaceae
- Genus: Homalanthus
- Species: H. polyandrus

Binomial name
- Homalanthus polyandrus (Müll.Arg.) G.Nicholson

= Homalanthus polyandrus =

Species of flowering plant

Homalanthus polyandrus is a species of plant in the family Euphorbiaceae. It is endemic to New Zealand.

== Description ==
Homalanthus polyandrus is a slender tree or shrub, 3–7 m tall. Branches brittle. Leaves of younger plants are up to 30 cm in diameter; of adult plants 5–10 cm long. Racemes slender and erect, 10–20 cm long, Male flowers are numerous, about 2 mm in diameter. There are 1–5 female flowers at the base of the raceme, on quite long, slender pedicels.
