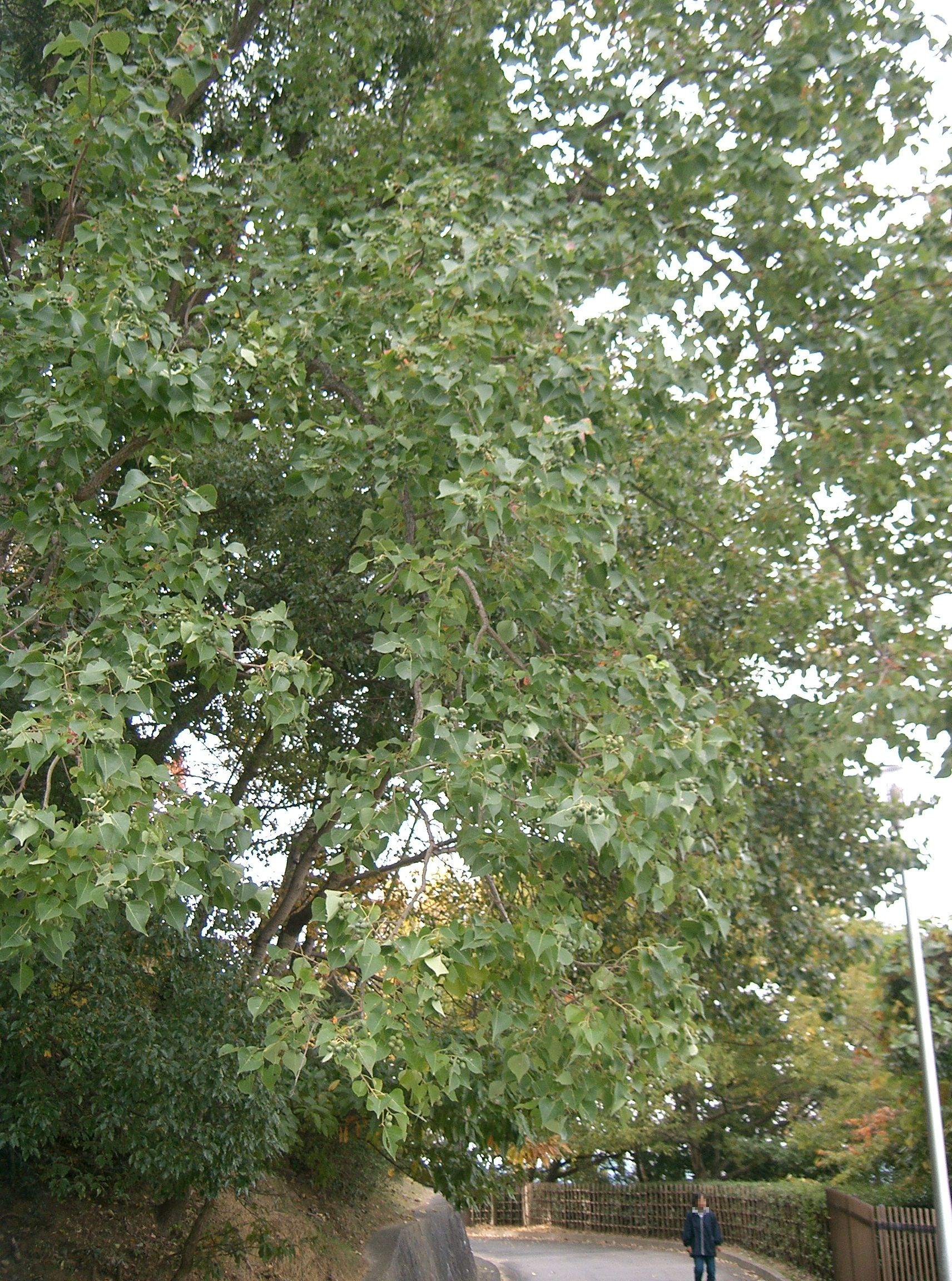
- Triadica sebifera

Scientific classification
- Kingdom: Plantae
- Clade: Tracheophytes
- Clade: Angiosperms
- Clade: Eudicots
- Clade: Rosids
- Order: Malpighiales
- Family: Euphorbiaceae
- Subfamily: Euphorbioideae
- Tribe: Hippomaneae; A.Juss. ex Spach

Subtribes
- Carumbiinae; Hippomaninae

= Hippomaneae =

Tribe of flowering plants

Hippomaneae is a tribe of flowering plants of the family Euphorbiaceae. It comprises 2 subtribes and 33 genera.

== Genera ==
Subtribe Carumbiinae

- Homalanthus A.Juss.

Subtribe Hippomaninae

- Actinostemon Mart. ex Klotzsch
- Adenopeltis
- Anomostachys
- Balakata
- Bonania
- Colliguaja Molina
- Conosapium
- Dalembertia
- Dendrocousinsia
- Dendrothrix
- Ditrysinia
- Duvigneaudia
- Excoecaria L.
- Falconeria
- Grimmeodendron Urb.
- Gymnanthes Sw.
- Hippomane L.
- Mabea
- Maprounea
- Microstachys
- Neoshirakia
- Pleradenophora
- Pseudosenefeldera
- Rhodothyrsus
- Sapium Jacq.
- Sclerocroton
- Sebastiania Spreng.
- Senefeldera Mart.
- Senefelderopsis
- Shirakiopsis
- Spegazziniophytum
- Spirostachys Sond.
- Stillingia Garden ex L.
- Triadica Lour.

== See also ==
- Taxonomy of the Euphorbiaceae
