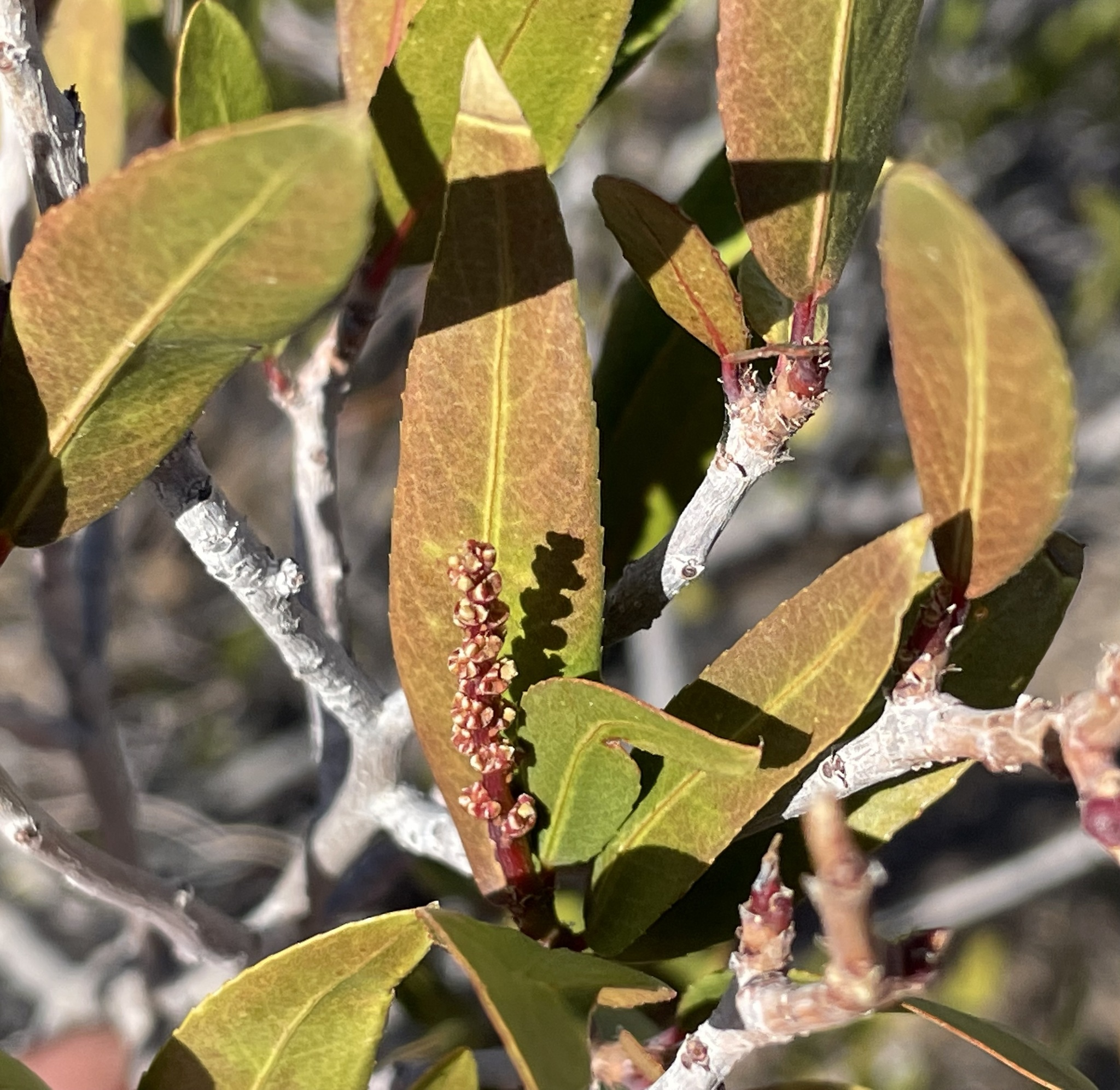

Scientific classification
- Kingdom: Plantae
- Clade: Embryophytes
- Clade: Tracheophytes
- Clade: Spermatophytes
- Clade: Angiosperms
- Clade: Eudicots
- Clade: Rosids
- Order: Malpighiales
- Family: Euphorbiaceae
- Genus: Pleradenophora
- Species: P. bilocularis

Binomial name
- Pleradenophora bilocularis Esser & A.L. Melo, 2018

= Pleradenophora bilocularis =

Species of plant

Pleradenophora bilocularis, commonly known as the arrow poison plant, is a species of shrub in the Euphorbiaceae (spurge family).

== Description ==
Pleradenophora bilocularis is a medium sized flowering shrub with alternate simple smooth leaves, flowering from March to November with greenish or green flowers.

Its sap was used as a poison to coat arrowheads and was wildly feared.

This shrub is also serves as a host plant for a large native silk moth Eupackardia calleta.

== Range and habitat ==
Pleradenophora bilocularis is most commonly found in upper bajadas, canyons, hills, and mountains in Southwestern Arizona, US, and in Mexico, south of the Guaymas region in Sonora, and in both Baja California states.
