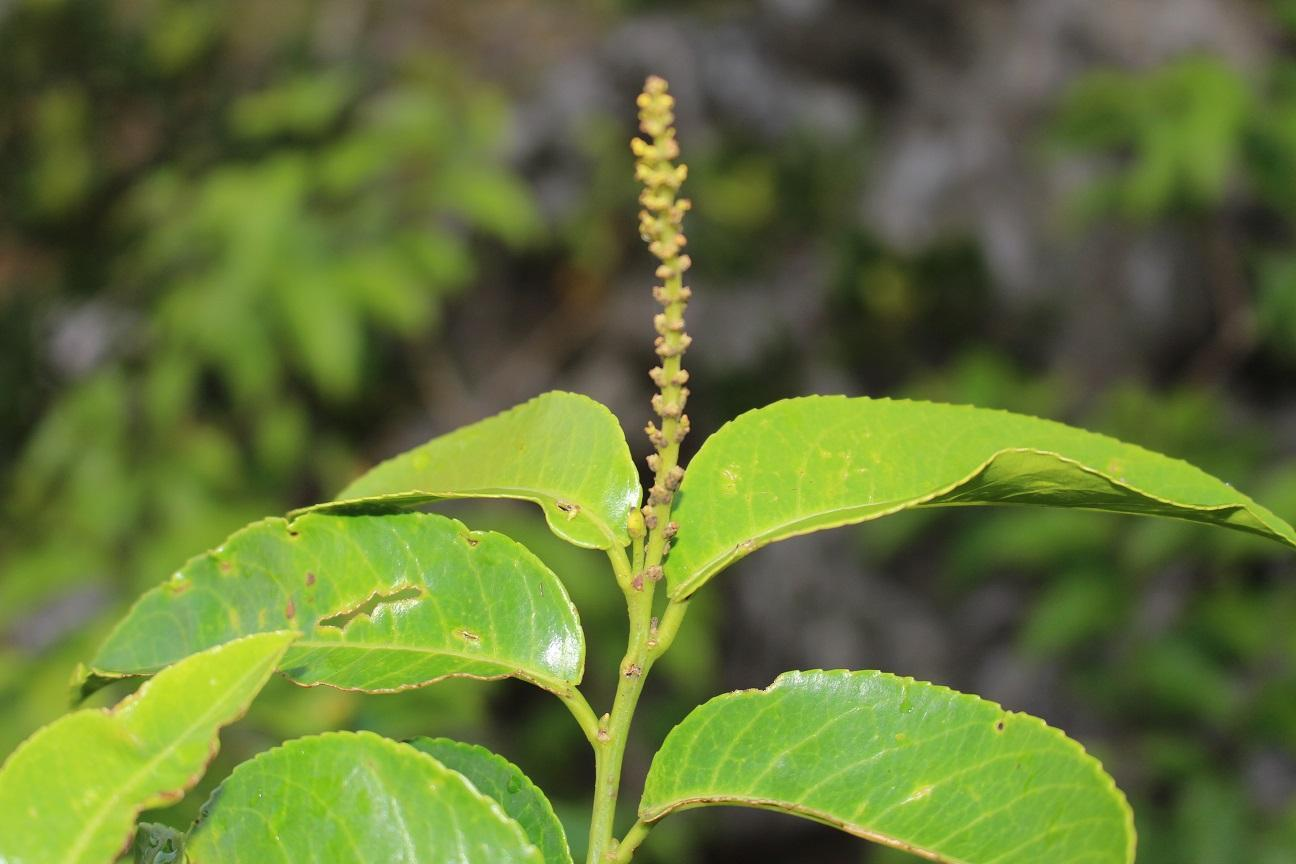
- Shirakiopsis elliptica

Scientific classification
- Kingdom: Plantae
- Clade: Tracheophytes
- Clade: Angiosperms
- Clade: Eudicots
- Clade: Rosids
- Order: Malpighiales
- Family: Euphorbiaceae
- Subfamily: Euphorbioideae
- Tribe: Hippomaneae
- Subtribe: Hippomaninae
- Genus: Shirakiopsis; Esser, 1999

= Shirakiopsis =

Genus of flowering plants

Shirakiopsis is a genus of flowering plants in the family Euphorbiaceae first described as a genus in 1999. There are six known species, 3 native to tropical Asia and 3 to tropical Africa.

These are trees and shrubs producing a milky latex. Their smaller branches are coated in pale-colored, yellowish, or sometimes reddish hairs. The toothed oblong to oval leaves are alternately arranged and there are small ovate to triangular stipules. The inflorescences are thyrses at the branch tips. The plants are monoecious; the inflorescence holds a few male flowers with usually one to three female flowers at the base. The male flower has three stamens. The female flower has 2 or 3 stigmas. There are no petals. The fruit is smooth, dry, and woody or occasionally slightly fleshy, and contains 2 or 3 seeds in each of its chambers.

Species

1. Shirakiopsis aubrevillei (Leandri) Esser in R.H.A.Govaerts, D.G.Frodin & A.Radcliffe-Smith - Ivory Coast, Ghana
2. Shirakiopsis elliptica (Hochst.) Esser in R.H.A.Govaerts, D.G.Frodin & A.Radcliffe-Smith - tropical + southern Africa from South Africa to Senegal and Ethiopia
3. Shirakiopsis indica (Willd.) Esser - India, Bangladesh, Sri Lanka, Andaman & Nicobar, Indochina, Malaysia, Indonesia, Philippines, Papuasia, Caroline Islands
4. Shirakiopsis sanchezii (Merr.) Esser - Mindanao, Sumbawa
5. Shirakiopsis trilocularis (Pax & K.Hoffm.) Esser - Tanzania
6. Shirakiopsis virgata (Zoll. & Moritzi ex Miq.) Esser - Java
