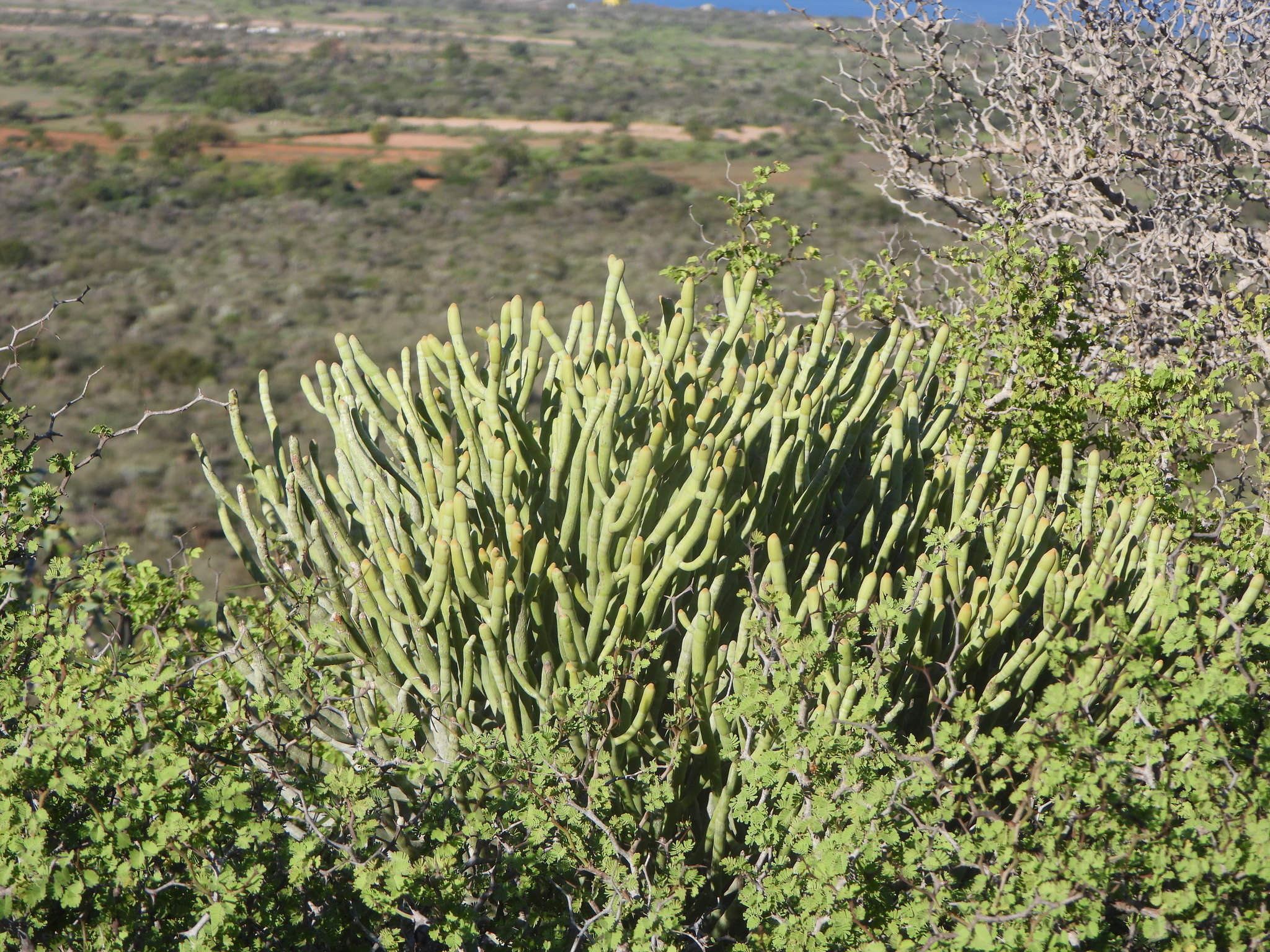
- Subspecies itampolensis in Atsimo-Andrefana, Madagascar

Conservation status
- Vulnerable (IUCN 3.1)

Scientific classification
- Kingdom: Plantae
- Clade: Tracheophytes
- Clade: Angiosperms
- Clade: Eudicots
- Clade: Rosids
- Order: Malpighiales
- Family: Euphorbiaceae
- Genus: Euphorbia
- Species: E. famatamboay

Binomial name
- Euphorbia famatamboay F.Friedmann & Cremers

Synonyms
- Euphorbia cedrorum Rauh & Hebding

= Euphorbia famatamboay =

Species of flowering plant

Euphorbia famatamboay is a species of plant in the family Euphorbiaceae. It is endemic to Madagascar. Its natural habitats are subtropical or tropical dry forests and subtropical or tropical dry shrubland. It is threatened by habitat loss.

== Taxonomy ==
Euphorbia famatamboay was scientifically described and named by Francis Friedmann and Georges Cremers in 1976. It is classified in the genus Euphorbia as part of the Euphorbiaceae family and has two accepted subspecies.

- Euphorbia famatamboay subsp. famatamboay
- Euphorbia famatamboay subsp. itampolensis

According to Plants of the World Online Euphorbia cedrorum is a heterotypic synonym of subspecies famatamboay.
