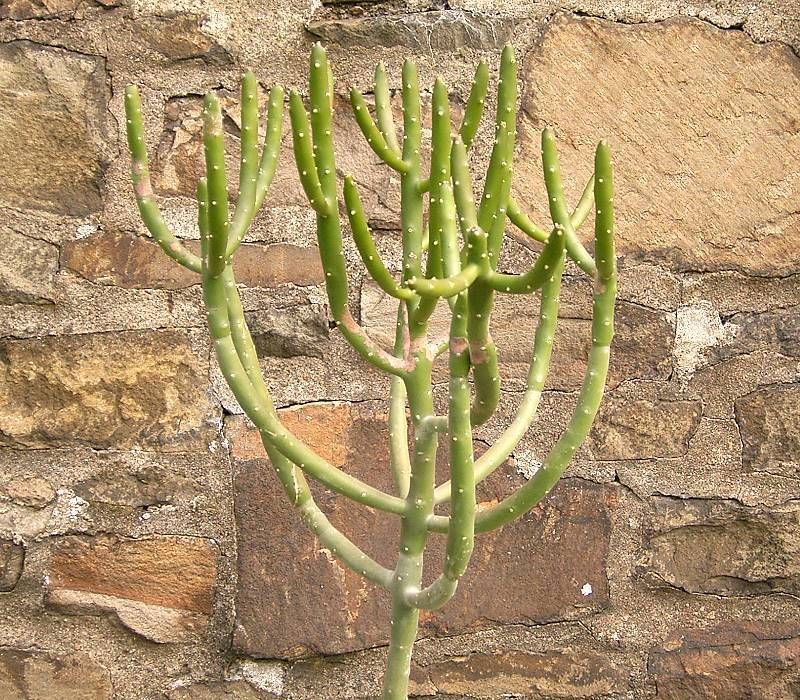
- Euphorbia cedrorum

Scientific classification
- Kingdom: Plantae
- Clade: Tracheophytes
- Clade: Angiosperms
- Clade: Eudicots
- Clade: Rosids
- Order: Malpighiales
- Family: Euphorbiaceae
- Subfamily: Euphorbioideae

Tribes
- Euphorbieae; Hippomaneae; Hureae; Pachystromateae; Stomatocalyceae

= Euphorbioideae =

Subfamily of flowering plants

The Euphorbioideae are a subfamily within the family Euphorbiaceae.

== See also ==
- Taxonomy of the Euphorbiaceae
