= History of candle making =

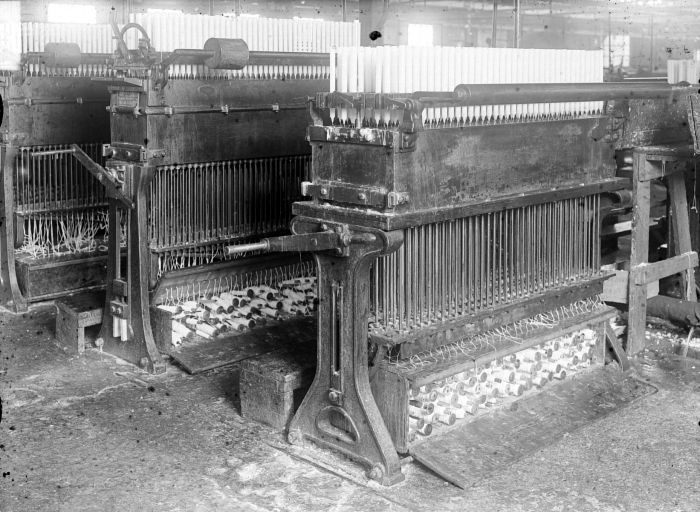
Candle moulding machine in Indonesia circa 1920

Candle making was developed independently in a number of countries around the world.

Candles were primarily made from tallow and beeswax in Europe from the Roman period until the modern era, when spermaceti (from sperm whales) was used in the 18th and 19th centuries, and purified animal fats (stearin) and paraffin wax since the 19th century. In China, textual evidence suggests that candles may have been made from whale fat in the Qin dynasty (221–206 BCE). Chinese candles may be made from beeswax, or stillingia tallow from Chinese tallow tree, or Chinese wax derived from insects. While the Japanese may use Japan wax from the Japanese wax tree. In India, wax from boiling cinnamon was used for temple candles.

Video of dipping candles as part of the process of making candles by hand

In Europe, a number of techniques were used to make candles in the early periods. These may be dipping or drawing a wick in molten wax or tallow, shaping it by hand by rolling soft wax around a wick, or pouring wax or tallow over the wick. Moulds were used later, and in the 19th century, large-scale industrial manufacturing technique was introduced for the mass production of candles. Candle use declined with the arrival of other methods of lighting such as electric light, although candles are still being made.

== Antiquity ==
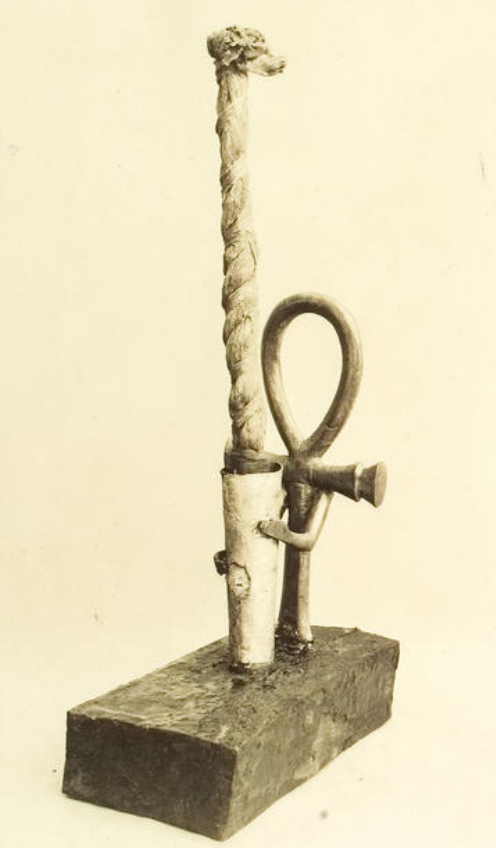
Object in the tomb of Tutankhamun that could be a candle holder.

Before candles were invented, ancient people used open fire, torches, splinters of resinous wood, and lamps to provide light at night. Primitive oil lamps in which a lit wick rested in a pool of oil or fat were used from the Paleolithic period, and pottery and stone lamps from the Neolithic period have been found. Candles may have been produced after the early Bronze Age, but it is unclear when and where candles were first used. Objects that could possibly be candle holders have been found in Babylonian and middle Minoan cultures, as well as in the tomb of Tutankhamun, and a possible depiction of a lit candle can be seen in the tomb of Amenemhat. However, the candles used in the early periods may not resemble current forms and were likely made from plant materials dipped in animal fat. Ancient Greeks offered to moon goddess Artemis moon-shaped honey cakes said to be lit by little torches or candles, and this has been proposed as the origin of the tradition of putting candles on birthday cakes. However, cakes with any resemblance to modern Western birthday cakes only arose by around 1600 in Europe. and ancient Greece used torches and oil lamps, and may have adopted candle use only in a later period from Rome.

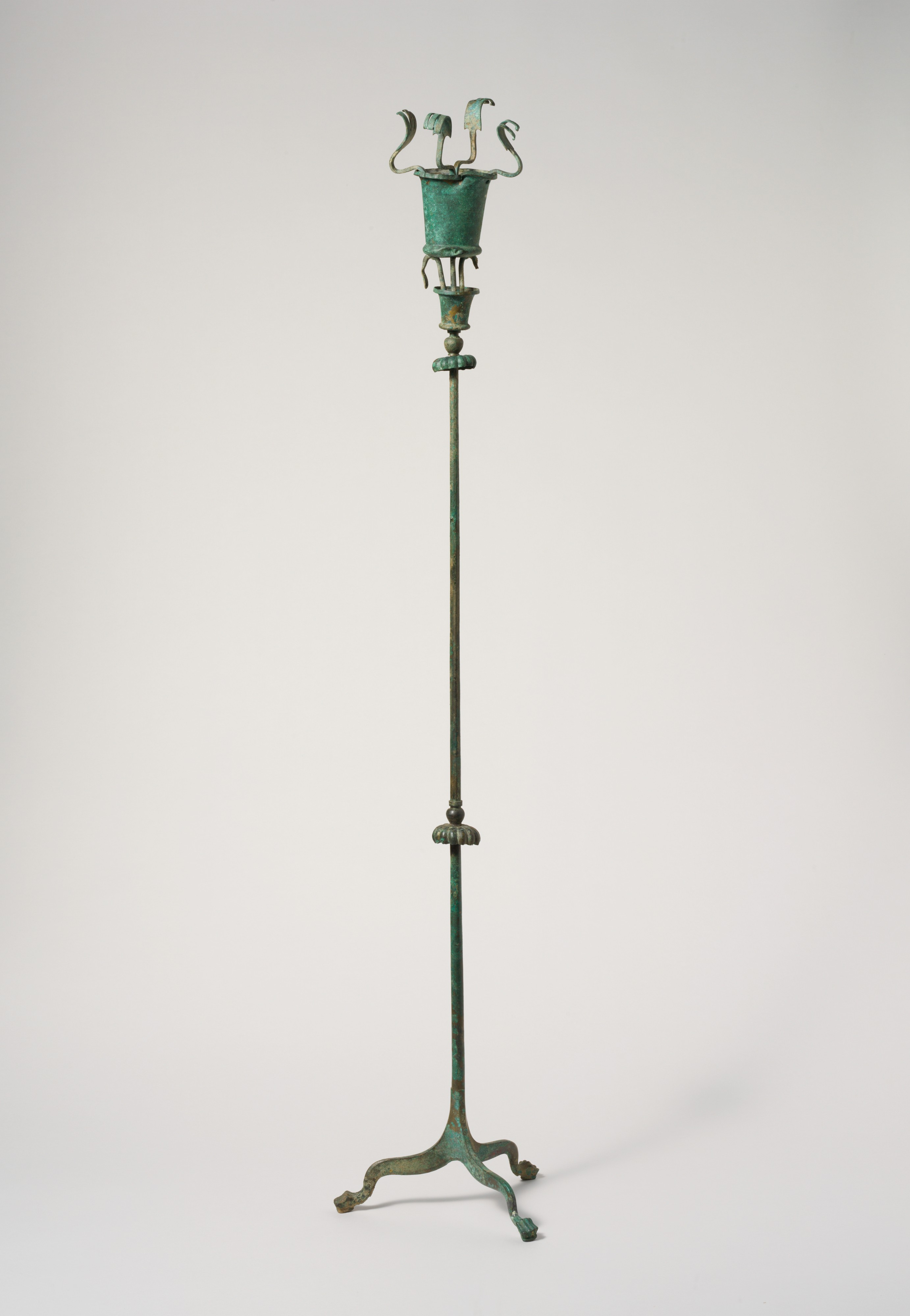
Etruscan candelabrum c. 550 B.C

It is often believed that the use of wicked candles developed in Italy in the Etruscan period; a picture of a candlestick exists in an Etruscan tomb at Orvieto, and the earliest Etruscan candlestick may date from the 7th century BC. Candles may have evolved from tapers (long thin candles) with wicks of oakum and other plant fibre soaked in fat, pitch or oil. Candles of antiquity were made from various forms of natural fat, tallow, and wax, and Romans made true dipped candles from tallow and beeswax. Beeswax candles were expensive and their use was limited to the wealthy. Oil lamps were the most widely used source of illumination in Roman Italy, but candles were common and regularly given as gifts during Saturnalia.

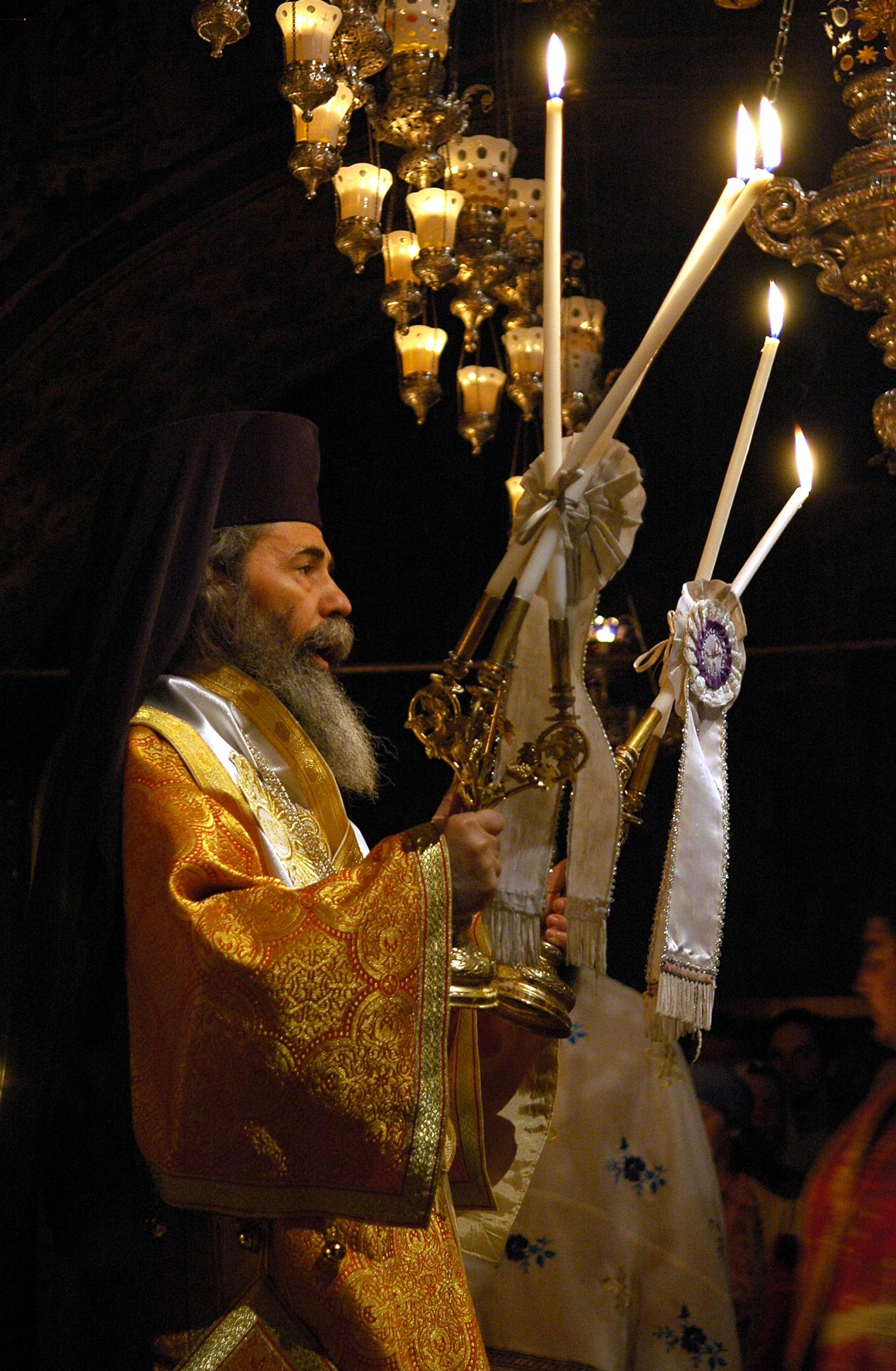
Candles used for blessing in Church of the Holy Sepulchre in Jerusalem

In Christian churches, candles gained significance in their decorative, symbolic and ceremonial uses. Wax candles, or candelae cereae recorded at the end of the 3rd century, were documented as Easter candles in Spain and Italy in the 4th century, the Christian festival Candlemas was named after the candle, and Pope Sergius I instituted the procession of lighted candles. Papal bulls decreed that tallow be excluded from use in altar candles, and high beeswax content was necessary for the candles of the high altar.

Beeswax was a byproduct of honey collection, and it was collected after honey had been extracted, and purified by boiling it in seawater a few times. The early candles were produced using a number of methods: dipping or drawing the wick in molten fat or wax repeatedly until it reached the desired size, building the candle by hand by rolling soft wax around a wick, or pouring fat or wax onto a wick to build up the candle. The use of moulds was a 14th-century development.

In China, the mausoleum of Qin Shi Huang (259–210 BC), first emperor of China, was said by historian Sima Qian to contain candles made from whale fat. The word zhú was used for "candle" during the Warring States period (403–221 BCE); some excavated bronzewares from that era feature a pricket thought to hold a candle.

The Han dynasty (202 BC – 220 AD) Jizhupian dictionary of about 40 BC hints at candles being made of beeswax, while the Book of Jin (compiled in 648) covering the Jin dynasty (266–420) makes a solid reference to the beeswax candle in regard to its use by the statesman Zhou Yi (d. 322). An excavated earthenware bowl from the 4th century AD, located at the Luoyang Museum, has a hollowed socket where traces of wax were found.

There is a fish called the eulachon or "candlefish", a type of smelt which is found from Oregon to Alaska. Native Americans from this region used oil from this fish for illumination. A simple candle could be made by putting the dried fish on a forked stick and then lighting it.

== Middle Ages ==
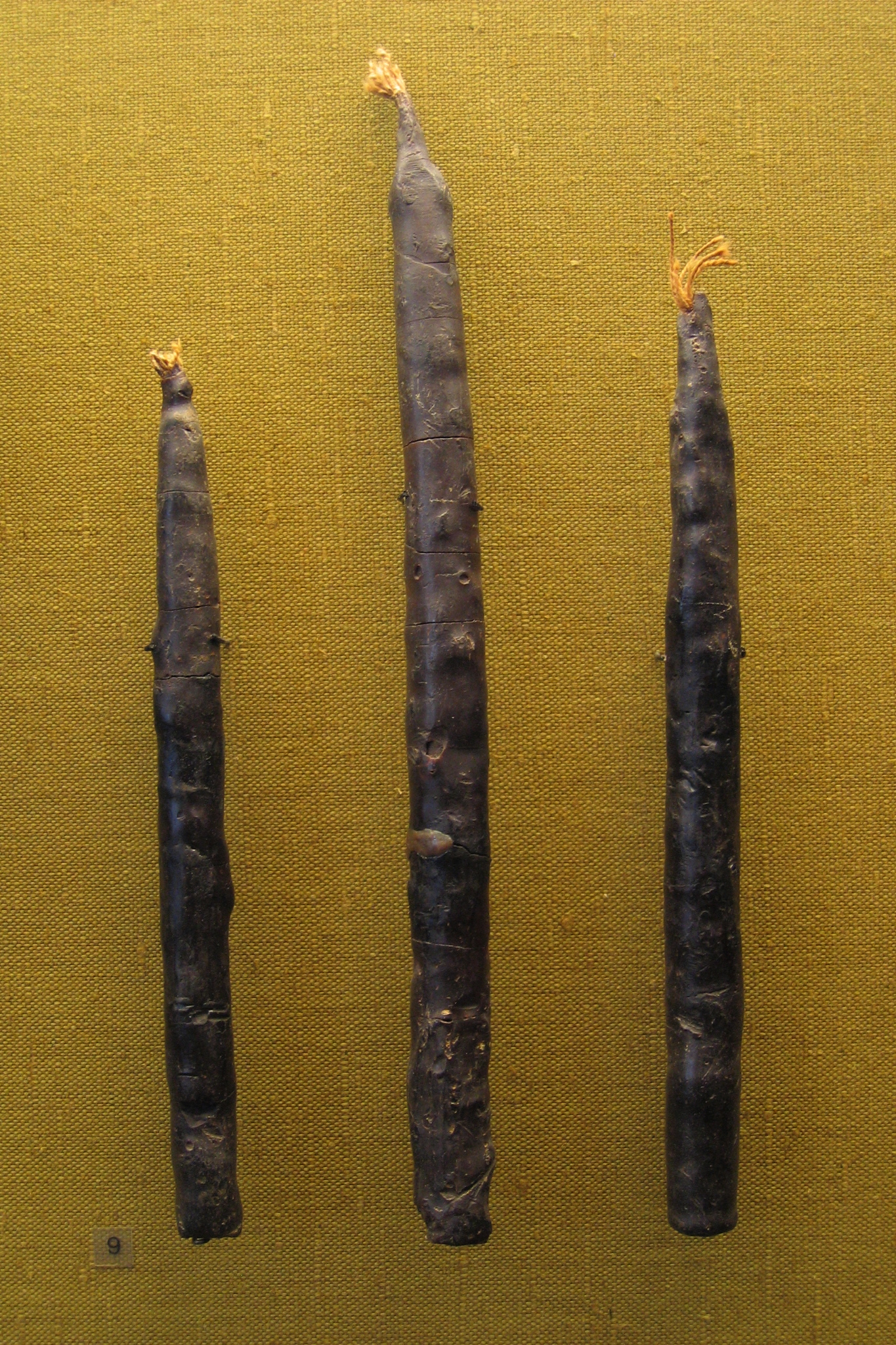
The oldest surviving bees wax candles north of the Alps from the alamannic graveyard of Oberflacht, Germany dating to 6th/7th century A.D.

After the collapse of the Roman Empire, trading disruptions made olive oil, the most common fuel for oil lamps, unavailable throughout much of Europe. As a consequence, candles became more widely used.

Candles were commonplace throughout Europe in the Middle Ages. Candle makers (known as chandlers) made candles from fats saved from the kitchen or sold their own candles from within their shops. The trade of the chandler is also recorded by the more picturesque name of "smeremongere", since they oversaw the manufacture of sauces, vinegar, soap and cheese. The popularity of candles is shown by their use in Candlemas and in Saint Lucy festivities.

Tallow, fat from cows or sheep, became the standard material used in candles in Europe. The unpleasant smell of tallow candles is due to the glycerine they contain. The smell of the manufacturing process was so unpleasant that it was banned by ordinance in several European cities. Beeswax was the preferred substance for the production of candles without the unpleasant odour, but its use remained restricted to the rich, and for churches and royal events, due to their great expense.

In England and France, candle making had become a guild craft by the 13th century, and a French guild was documented as early as 1061. The Tallow Chandlers Company of London was formed in about 1300 in London, and in 1456 was granted a coat of arms. The Wax Chandlers Company existed prior to 1330 and acquired its charter in 1484. By 1415, tallow candles were used in street lighting. The first candle mould comes from the 15th century in Paris. Sieur de Brez of Paris introduced the technique of using a mould to England, although candles had a tendency to stick to the mould and break when it was being removed from the mould. Real improvements for the efficient production of candles in moulds were only achieved in the 19th century.

In the Middle East, during the Abbasid and Fatimid Caliphates, beeswax was the dominant material used for candle making. Beeswax was often imported from long distances; for example, candle makers from Egypt used beeswax from Tunis. As in Europe, these candles were fairly expensive, and most commoners used oil lamps instead. Elites, though, could afford to spend large sums on expensive candles. For example, the Abbasid caliph al-Mutawakkil spent 1.2 million silver dirhams annually on candles for his royal palaces.

In early modern Syria, candles were in high demand by all socioeconomic classes because they were customarily lit during marriage ceremonies. There were candle makers' guilds in the Safavid capital of Isfahan during the 1500s and 1600s. However, candle makers had a relatively low social position in Safavid Iran, comparable to barbers, bathhouse workers, fortune tellers, bricklayers, and porters.

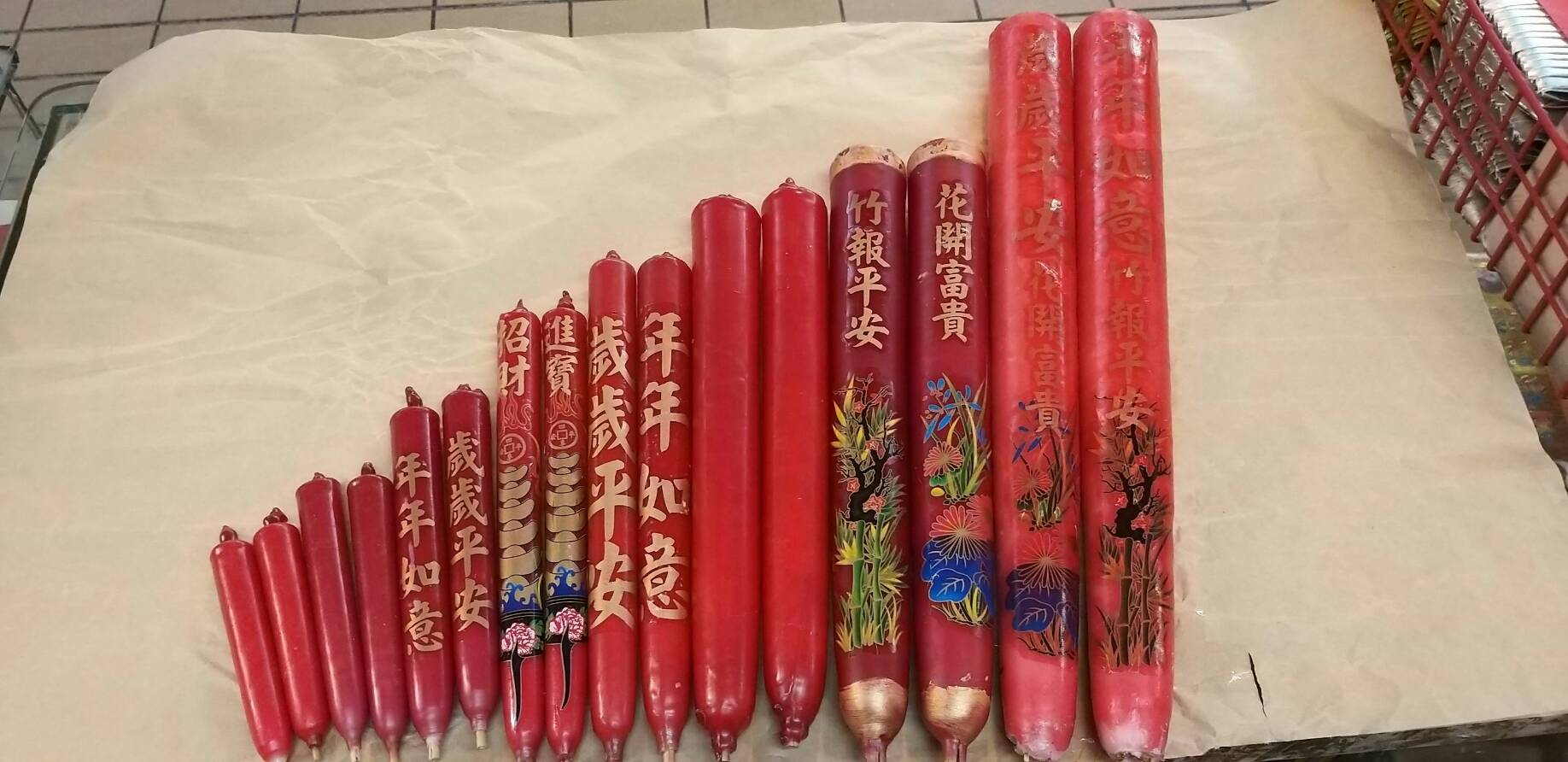
Handmade Chinese candles with bamboo core

In China, beeswax candles were common in the Tang and Sung dynasties. Wax from a plant, stillingia tallow from Chinese tallow tree, may be used to make candles together with beeswax. Stillingia tallow has a low melting point and it therefore may be encased with the harder beeswax or Chinese wax. The Chinese may have started cultivating the tallow tree in the Yangtze Delta region in the 7th century. Wax from the plant was commonly used to make Buddhist ceremonial candles.

Another type of wax, the Chinese wax derived from insects and resembles the best spermaceti, may also be used. The production of Chinese wax was mastered by the Yuan dynasty. A type of Chinese candle has a bamboo rod as its core, onto which paper is wound spirally with rush pith as wick, and this is then repeatedly dipped in melted wax or fats and cooled until the desired size is reached. The candles may be coloured and sometimes decorated with characters.

The Japanese have similar candle-making techniques as the Chinese, but they also developed a method of moulding candles using paper tubes. They may use Japan wax from the Japanese wax tree for making candles.

Wax from boiling cinnamon was used for temple candles in India. Yak butter was used for candles in Tibet.

== Modern era ==
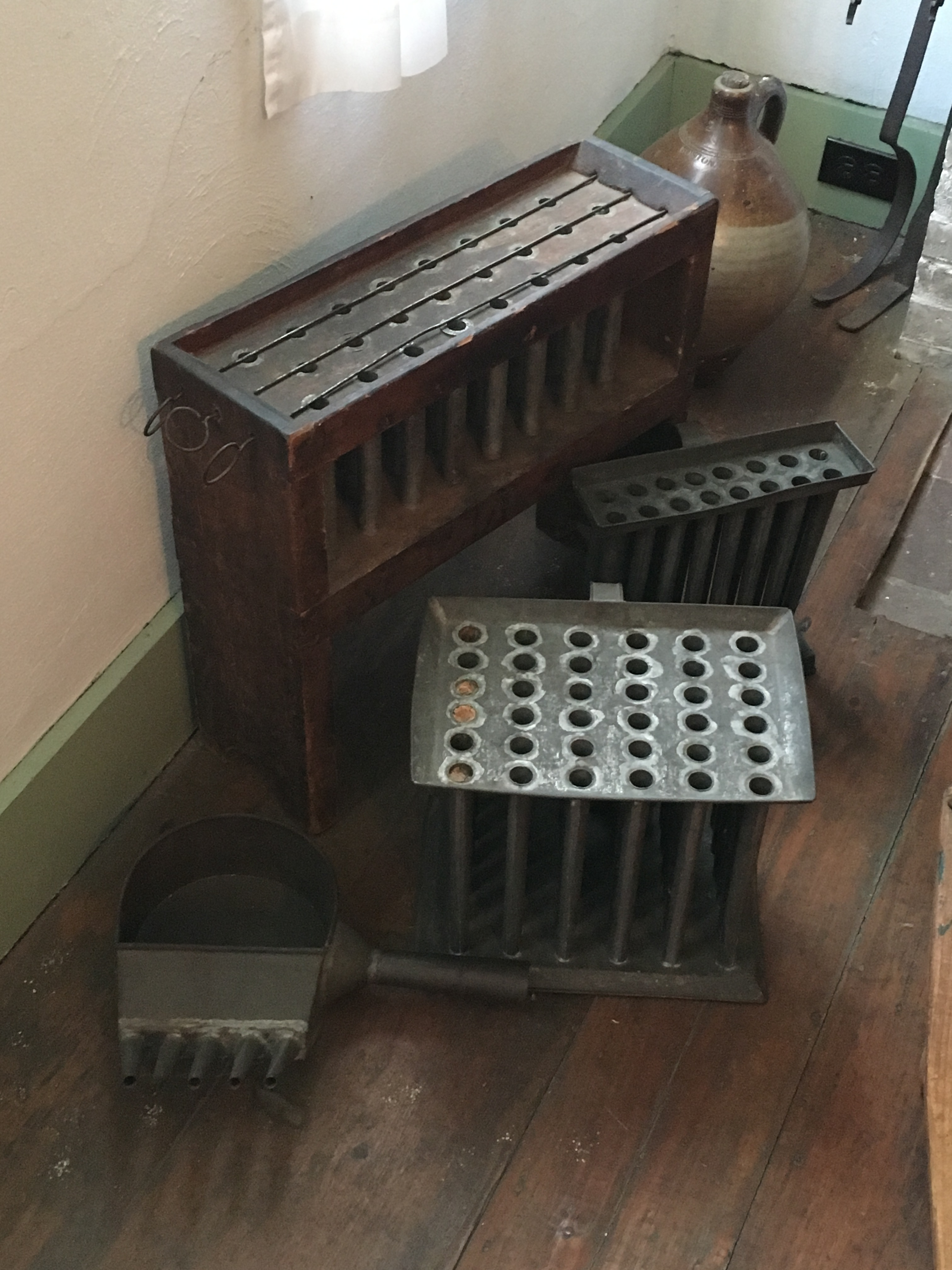
'Colonial'-style tapered candle molds

With the growth of the whaling industry in the 18th century, spermaceti, an oil that comes from a cavity in the head of the sperm whale, became a widely used substance for candle making. The wax was made by crystallizing the oil, and was the first candle substance to become available in mass quantities. Like beeswax, spermaceti wax did not create a repugnant odor when burned, and produced a significantly brighter light. It was also harder than either tallow or beeswax, so it would not soften or bend in the summer heat. The first "standard candles" were made from spermaceti wax.

By 1800, an even cheaper alternative was discovered. Colza oil, derived from Brassica campestris, and a similar oil derived from rapeseed, yielded candles that produce clear, smokeless flames. The French chemists Michel Eugène Chevreul (1786–1889) and Joseph-Louis Gay-Lussac (1778–1850) patented stearin in 1825. Like tallow, this was derived from animals, but had no glycerine content.

=== Industrialization ===
Joseph Morgan's candle making machine revolutionized candle making

The manufacture of candles became an industrialised mass market in the mid 19th century. In 1834, Joseph Morgan, a pewterer from Manchester, England, patented a machine that revolutionised candle making. It allowed continuous production of molded candles, using a cylinder with a moveable piston to eject candles as they solidified. This method produced about 1,500 candles per hour: (according to his patent, "with three men and five boys [the machine] will manufacture two tons of candle in twelve hours"). Now poorer people could now easily afford candles.

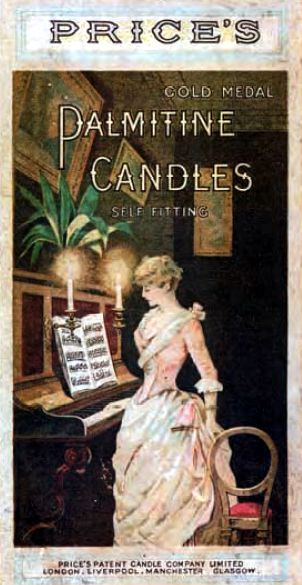
Price's Candles became the largest candle manufacturer in the world by the end of the 19th century

At this time, candlemakers also began to fashion wicks out of tightly braided (rather than simply twisted) strands of cotton. This technique makes wicks curl over as they burn, maintaining the height of the wick and therefore the flame. Because much of the excess wick is incinerated, these are referred to as "self-trimming" or "self-consuming" wicks.

In 1848 James Young established the world's first oil refinery at the Alfreton Ironworks in Riddings, Derbyshire. Two paraffin wax candles were made from the naturally occurring paraffin wax present in the oil, and these candles illuminated a lecture at the Royal Institution by Lyon Playfair. In the mid-1850s, James Young succeeded in distilling paraffin wax from coal and oil shales at Bathgate in West Lothian, and developed a commercially viable method of production. The paraffin wax was processed by distilling residue left after crude petroleum was refined.

Paraffin could be used to make inexpensive candles of high quality. It was a bluish-white wax, burned cleanly, and left no unpleasant odor, unlike tallow candles. A drawback to the substance was that early coal- and petroleum-derived paraffin waxes had a very low melting point. The introduction of stearin, discovered by Michel Eugène Chevreul, solved this problem. Stearin is hard and durable, with a convenient melting range of 54–72.5 °C (129.2–162.5 °F). By the end of the 19th century, most candles being manufactured consisted of paraffin and stearic acid.

By the late 19th century, Price's Candles, based in London, was the largest candle manufacturer in the world. The company traced its origins back to 1829, when William Wilson invested in 1,000 acres (1.6 mi^{2}; 4.0 km^{2}) of coconut plantation in Sri Lanka. His aim was to make candles from coconut oil. Later he tried palm oil from palm trees. An accidental discovery swept all his ambitions aside when his son George Wilson, a talented chemist, distilled the first petroleum oil in 1854. George also pioneered the implementation of the technique of steam distillation, and was thus able to manufacture candles from a wide range of raw materials, including skin fat, bone fat, fish oil and industrial greases.

In America, Syracuse, New York developed into a global center for candle manufacturing from the mid-nineteenth century. Manufacturers included Will & Baumer, Mack Miller, Muench Kruezer, and Cathedral Candle Company.

=== Decline of the candle industry ===
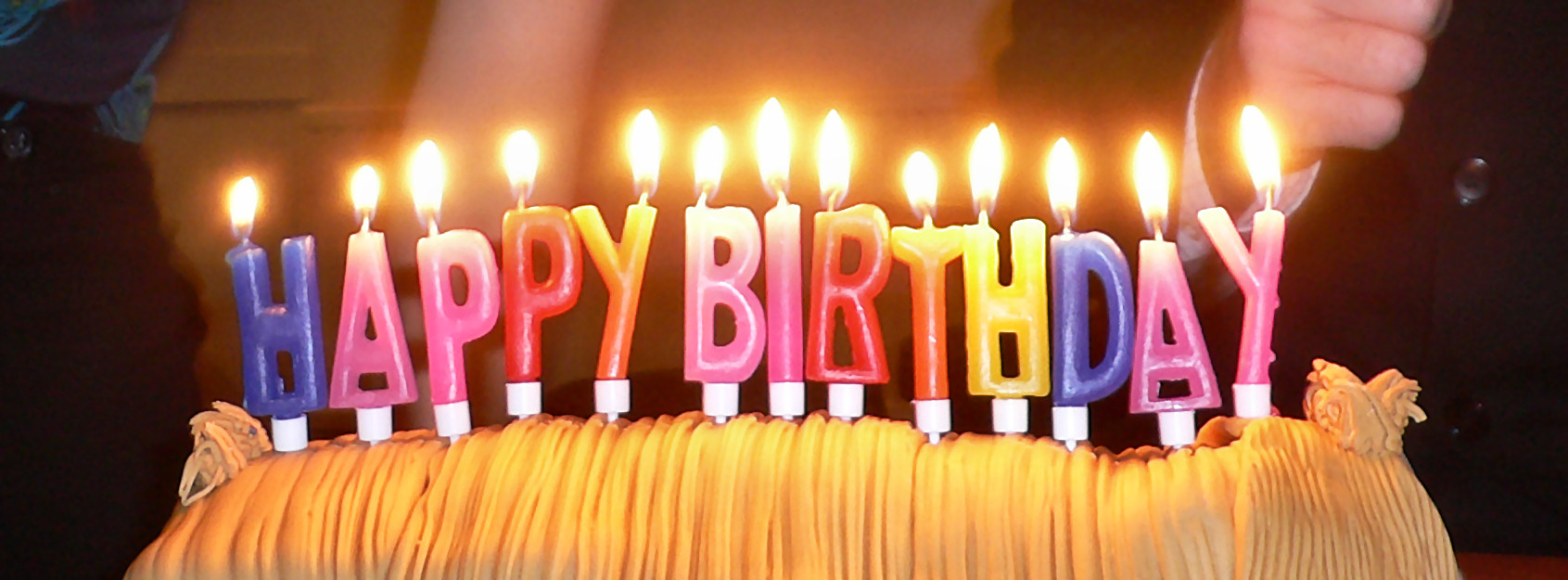
Candles here are used to celebrate a birthday

Despite advances in candle making, the candle industry declined rapidly upon the introduction of superior methods of lighting, including kerosene lamps, and from 1879 the incandescent light bulb.

In the 20th century, candles came to be marketed as more of a decorative item. Candles, however, retain their unique symbolic significance, for instance as votive offerings. Candles became available in a broad array of sizes, shapes and colors, and consumer interest in scented candles began to grow. During the 1990s, new types of candle waxes were being developed due to an unusually high demand for candles. Paraffin, a by-product of oil, was quickly replaced by new waxes and wax blends owing to rising costs.

Candle manufacturers looked at waxes such as soy, palm and flax-seed oil, often blending them with paraffin to achieve the performance of paraffin with the price benefits of the other waxes. The creation of unique wax blends, now requiring different fragrance chemistries and loads, encouraged candle wick manufacturers to innovate to meet performance needs with the often tougher-to-burn formulations.

== Gallery ==
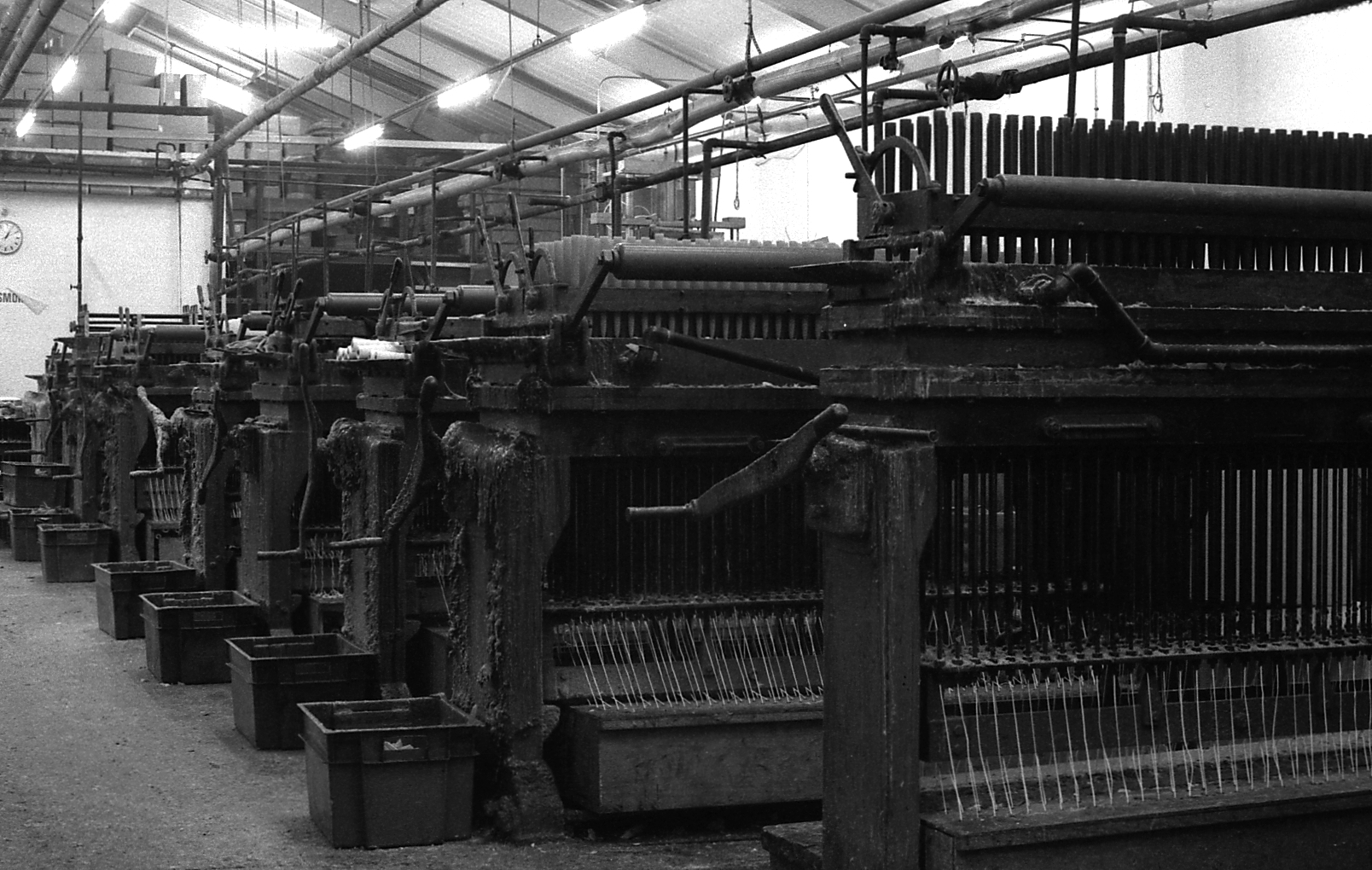
Hand operated, water cooled, candle making machines

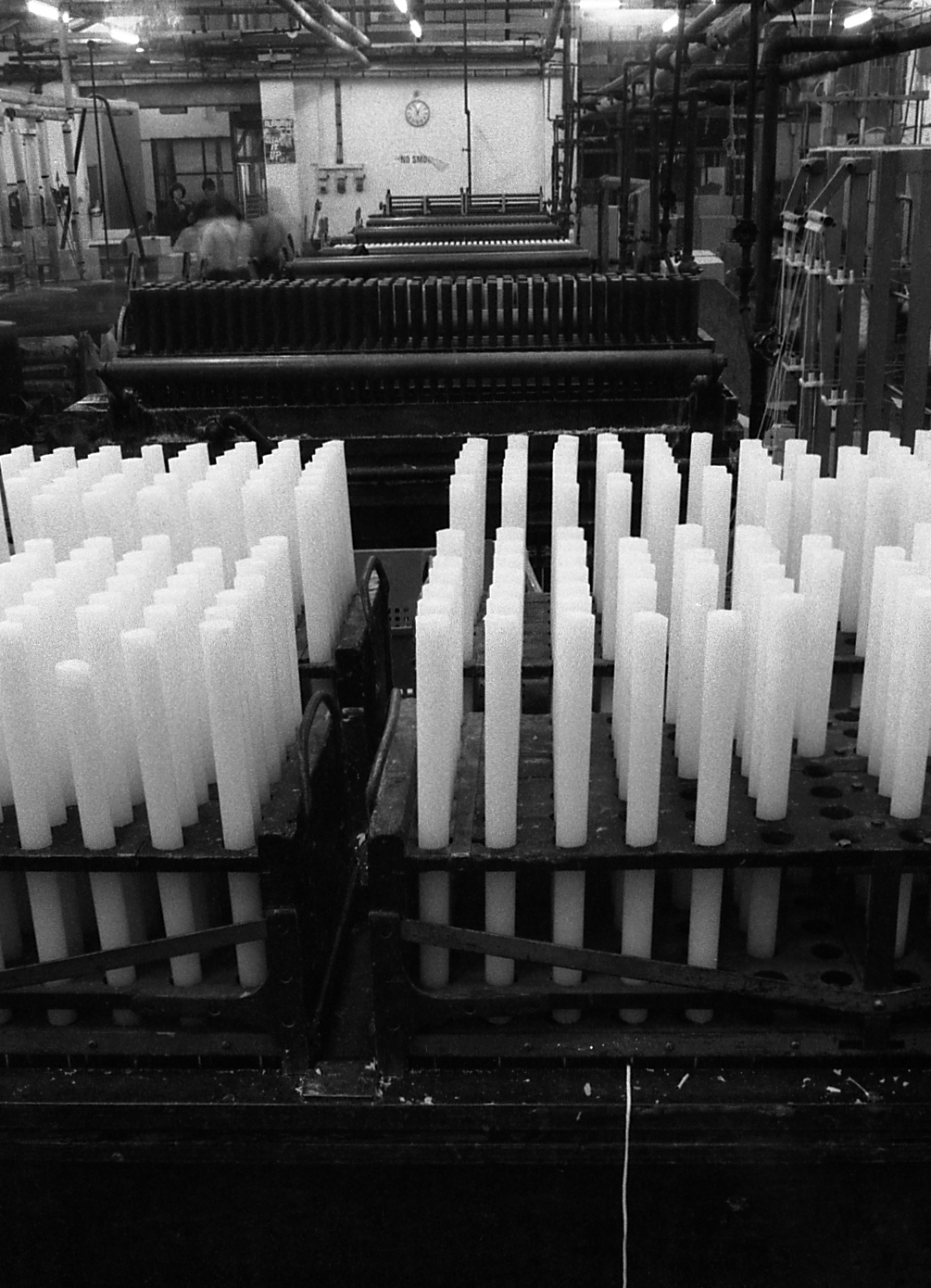
12" candles wound out from a hand-operated machine

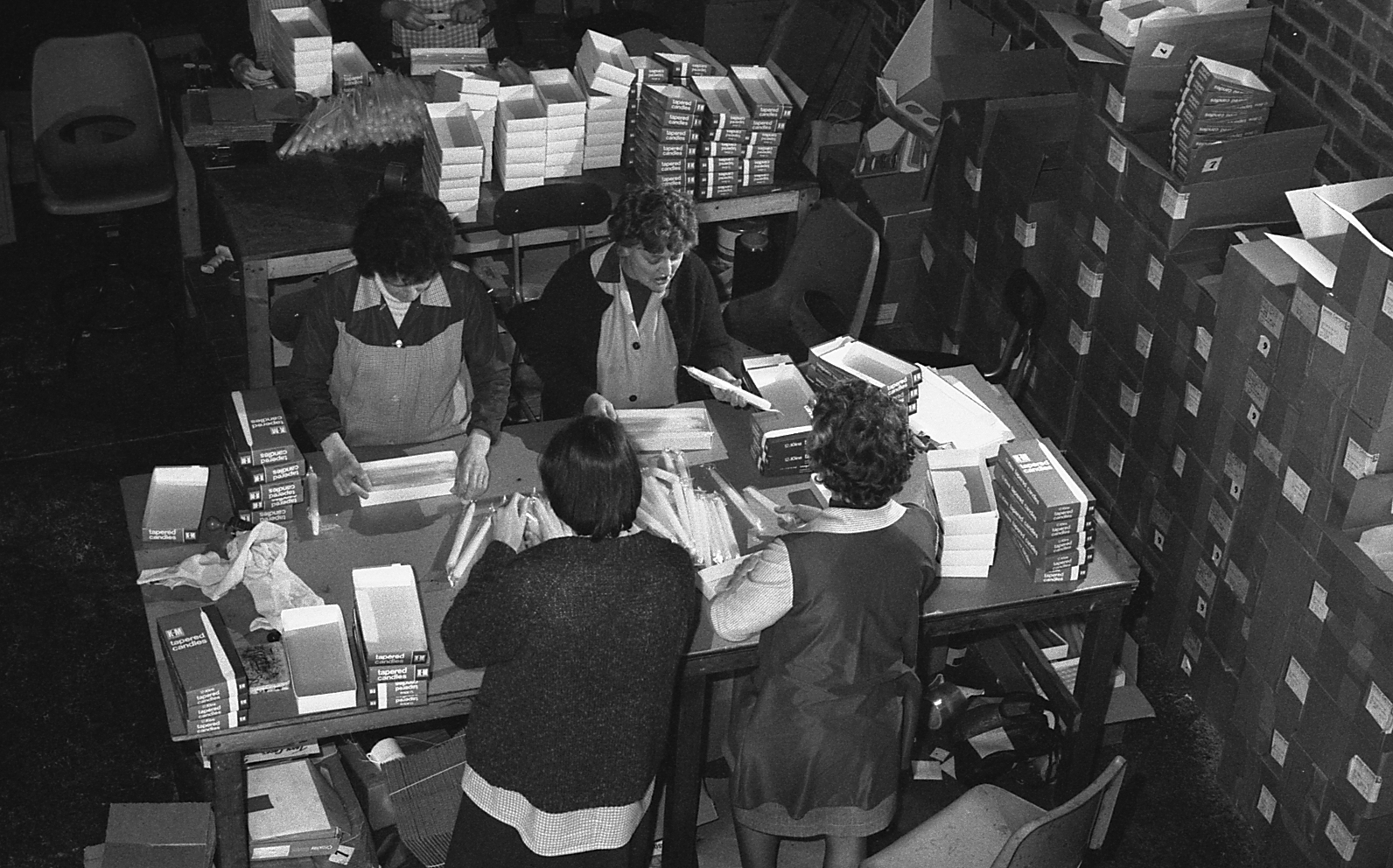
Workers packing candles into boxes

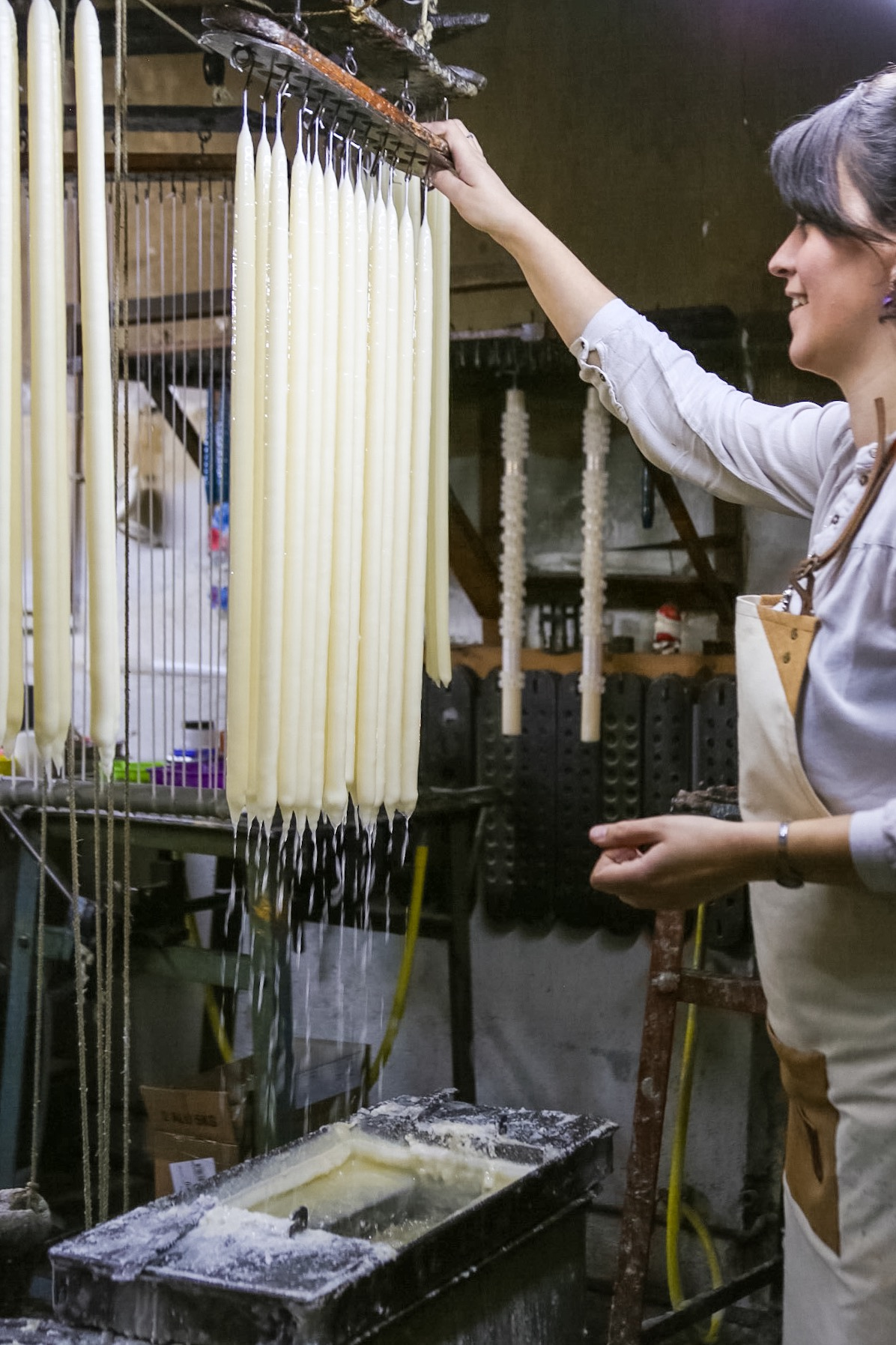
Candle making by dipping

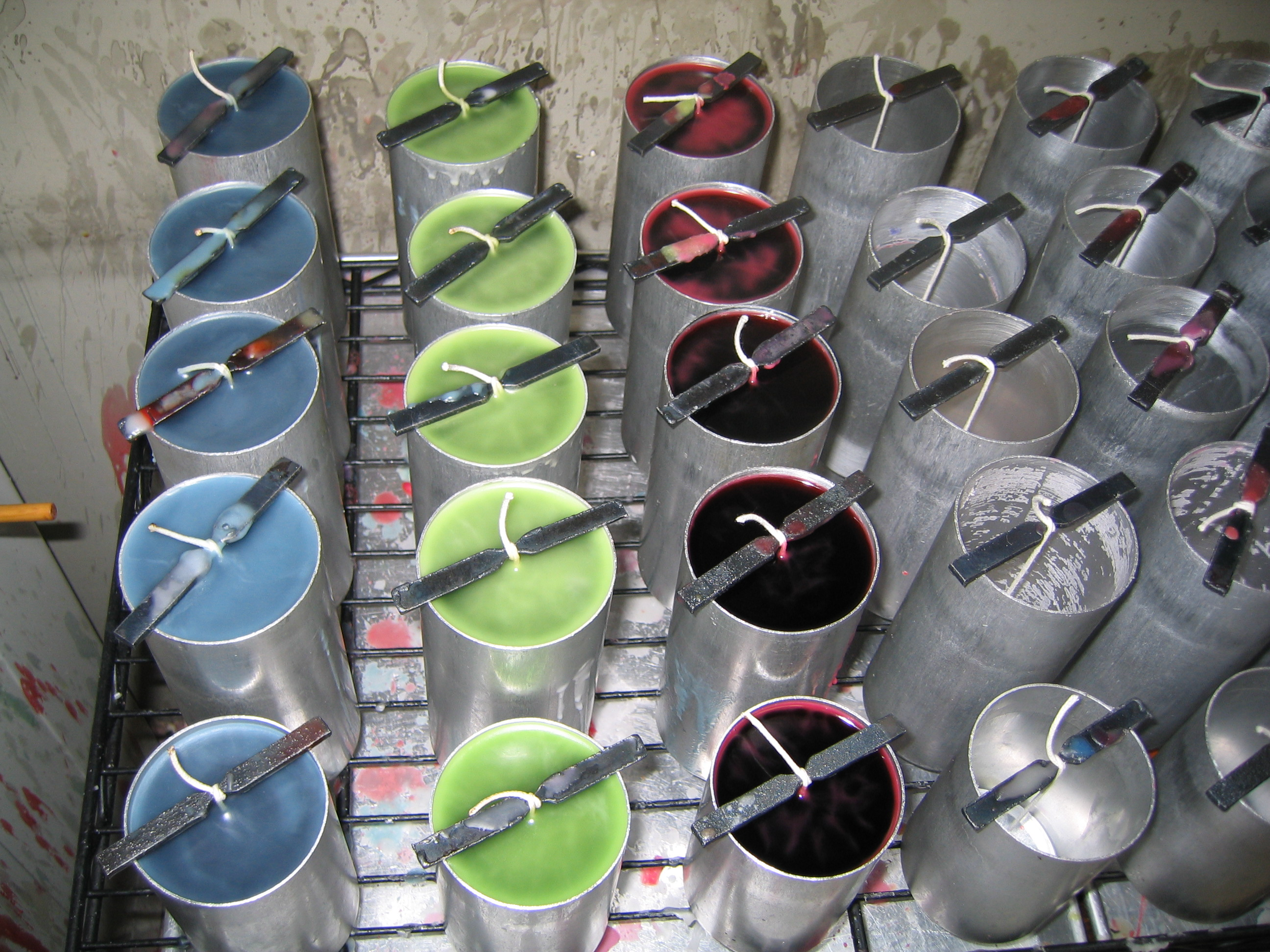
Candle making with moulds

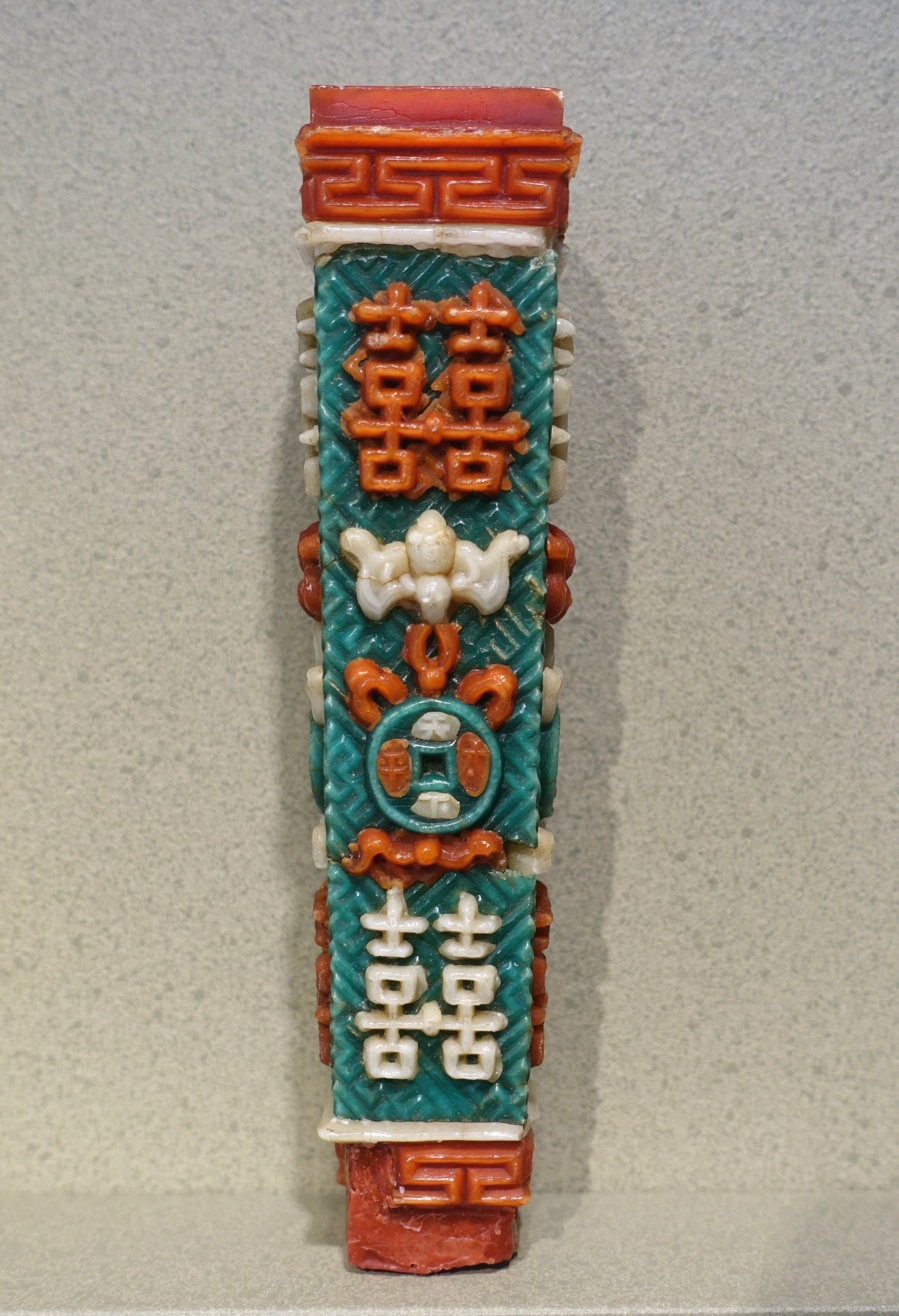
A decorated Qing dynasty candle

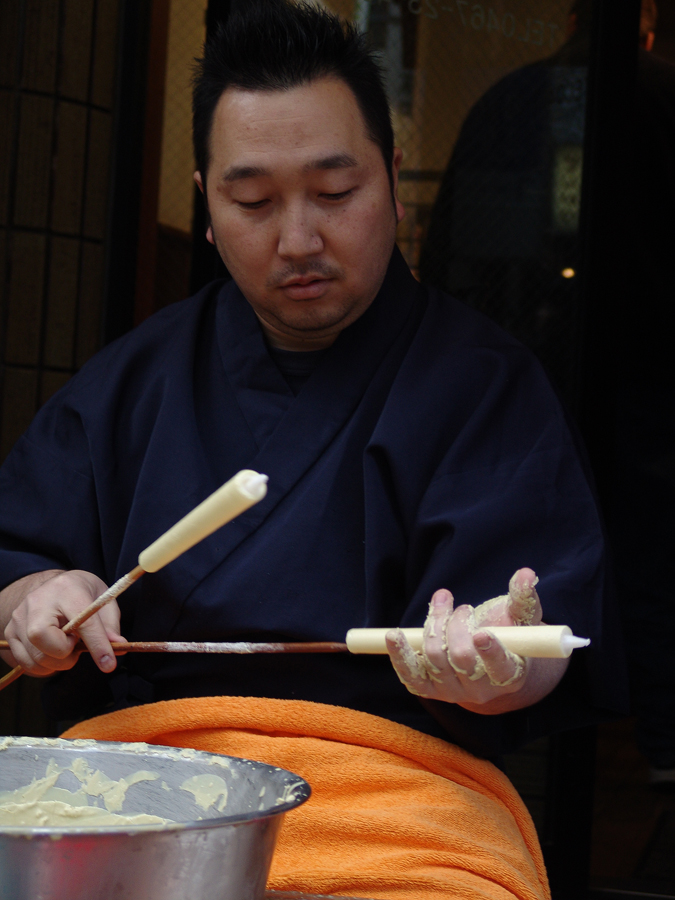
Handmade candle in Japan
