= Candleberry tree =

Candleberry tree is a common name for several plants and may refer to:

- Aleurites moluccanus
- Myrica cerifera, native to North and Central America and the Caribbean
- Triadica sebifera, native to eastern China and Taiwan
