= Cathedral Candle Company =

Candle maker in Syracuse, New York, U.S.

- Industry: Candle making
- Founded: 1897 in Syracuse, New York, U.S.
- Founder: Jacob Steigerwald
- Headquarters: 510 Kirkpatrick Street, Syracuse, New York
- Area served: United States
- Products: paschal candles; votive candles; altar candles; advent candles; sacramental candles; sanctuary lights
- Website: cathedralcandle.com

Cathedral Candle Company is a family-owned and operated candle manufacturer in Syracuse, New York. Founded by Jacob Steigerwald in 1897, the company is now in its fourth generation of Steigerwald family management and is one of the leading suppliers of church candles in the U.S.

== History ==
German candlemaker Jacob Steigerwald came to the United States in 1880 when the Baumer Candle Company recruited him to work as a supervisor for their Syracuse factory. After sixteen years, Baumer merged with another Syracuse candlemaker to expand their business into the residential market, so Steigerwald found his own company focused exclusively on church candles. Cathedral Candle Company opened at 510 Kirkpatrick Street in 1897, where it still maintains its sole manufacturing operation today.

== Products ==
Cathedral Candle Company makes candles for Christian churches, including the Catholic, Protestant, and Orthodox denominations. Their product line includes paschal candles, votive candles, altar candles, advent candles, sacramental candles, and sanctuary lights.

== Usage and recognition ==
Cathedral Candles have been used by bishops, cardinals, and popes, including Benedict XVI during his 2008 visit to the United States. In 2006, then United States Senator Hillary Clinton described Cathedral Candle Company as “a great example of a tradition of commitment to local roots, the local economy and the local community.”
