= Stillingia oil =

Oil from the seeds of Stillingia sebifera

Stillingia oil is an oil extracted (by solvents) from the seeds of plants of the Triadica genus such as Triadica sebifera (Chinese tallow tree) and Triadica cochinchinensis (Mountain tallow tree). It is a drying oil used in paints and varnishes, and it is believed to be toxic in China. It must be distinguished from stillingia tallow, a fatty substance that surrounds the seeds in the fruit and must be removed before extracting the oil.

The name of the oil was given when the two plants were classified in the genus Stillingia, with binomial names "Stillingia sebifera" and "Stillingia discolor". Sometime prior to 1950 the species were reclassified in the genus Sapium, and articles from the 1950s still use the names "Sapium sebiferum" and "Sapium discolor" However, since about 2002 the plants have been reclassified again in the genus Triadica, and the second one had its species name changed to "cochinchinensis".

Stillingia oil has a typical drying time of 4–6 hours. The seeds produce 20-30% w/w of tallow fat and 10-17% w/w of stillingia oil. It has iodine number 127, a saponification value of 206, and a thiocyanogen value of 100.7.

== Composition ==
The composition of the oil may vary considerably with the age of the seeds (which can remain on the tree for a year after maturation) and with the extraction process. The major components of typical fresh oil are triglycerides of the following fatty acids:

| Fatty acid | (a) | %(b) | %(b) |
| trans-2,cis-4-decadienoic acid (C10:2) | D | 8 | |
| lauric acid (C12:0) | R | | 3.5 |
| palmitic acid (C16:0) | P | 9 | 8 |
| heptadecanoic acid (C17:0) | H | | 1.8 |
| stearic acid (C18:0) | S | 4 | 2.5 |
| oleic acid (C18:1) | O | 8 | 16 |
| linoleic acid (C18:2) | L | 25 | 29 |
| linolenic acid (C18:3) | N | 45 | 40 |
| arachidic acid (C20:0) | A | trace | |

(a) Fatty acid codes used in the discussion below.
(b) Molar percentages.

Several analyses of authentic oil in the 1950s found significant amounts of 2.4-decadienoic acid, later identified as the trans-2, cis-4 isomer, which had not been detected in natural oils before, and was conjectured to play a relatively prominent part in the drying and polymerizing properties of stillingia oil. Another analysis (1992) found that the tocopherol fraction contains nearly pure (92%) γ-tocotrienol.

According to a 1953 analysis of authentic oil, 64% (by mass) of the oil's triglycerides have three unsaturated acyls connected to the glycerol hub, 34% have two, and about 2% have just one. The most common triglyceride component, with over half the mass, had (1) one linoleic and two linolenic acyls, or LNN or NLN using the codes of the table above. The next two most common types have a 2,4-decadienoic acyl on the second carbon of the glycerol hub, flanked by (2) one linoleic and one linolenic acyl (LDN), or (3) two linolenic acyls (NDN). The 2,4-decadienoic acyl occurs almost exclusively in those two components. There are smaller proportions of triglycerides with (4) one saturated, one linoleic, and one linolenic (XLN, LXN, etc.); (5) one saturated and two linolenic; (XNN or NXN) (6) one oleic, one linoleic, one linolenic (OLN, LON, etc.); and (7) one oleic and two linolenic (ONN o NON). Over 95% of the triglycerides in stillingia oil were found to have three doubly-unsaturated fatty acids. This proportion is greater than that of linseed oil, and comparable with that in conophor oil.

An analysis in 1992 found that an 8-hydroxy-5,6-octadienoic acid was joined to by an estolide linkage to the 2,4-decadienoic acyl.

A more recent analysis (2009) of commercial oil found instead 80% (molar) of LLN, 14% PLN, 3% PPL, 1.5 RPL, and 0.5 SLN. This analysis also failed to find the 2,4-decadienoic acid. Instead it found twice as much oleic acid (16%), 3.5% of lauric acid, and 1.8% of heptadecanoic acid; as well as 1% (by weight) of phospholipids and about 0.3% of glycolipids. No explanation was given for these discrepancies.
