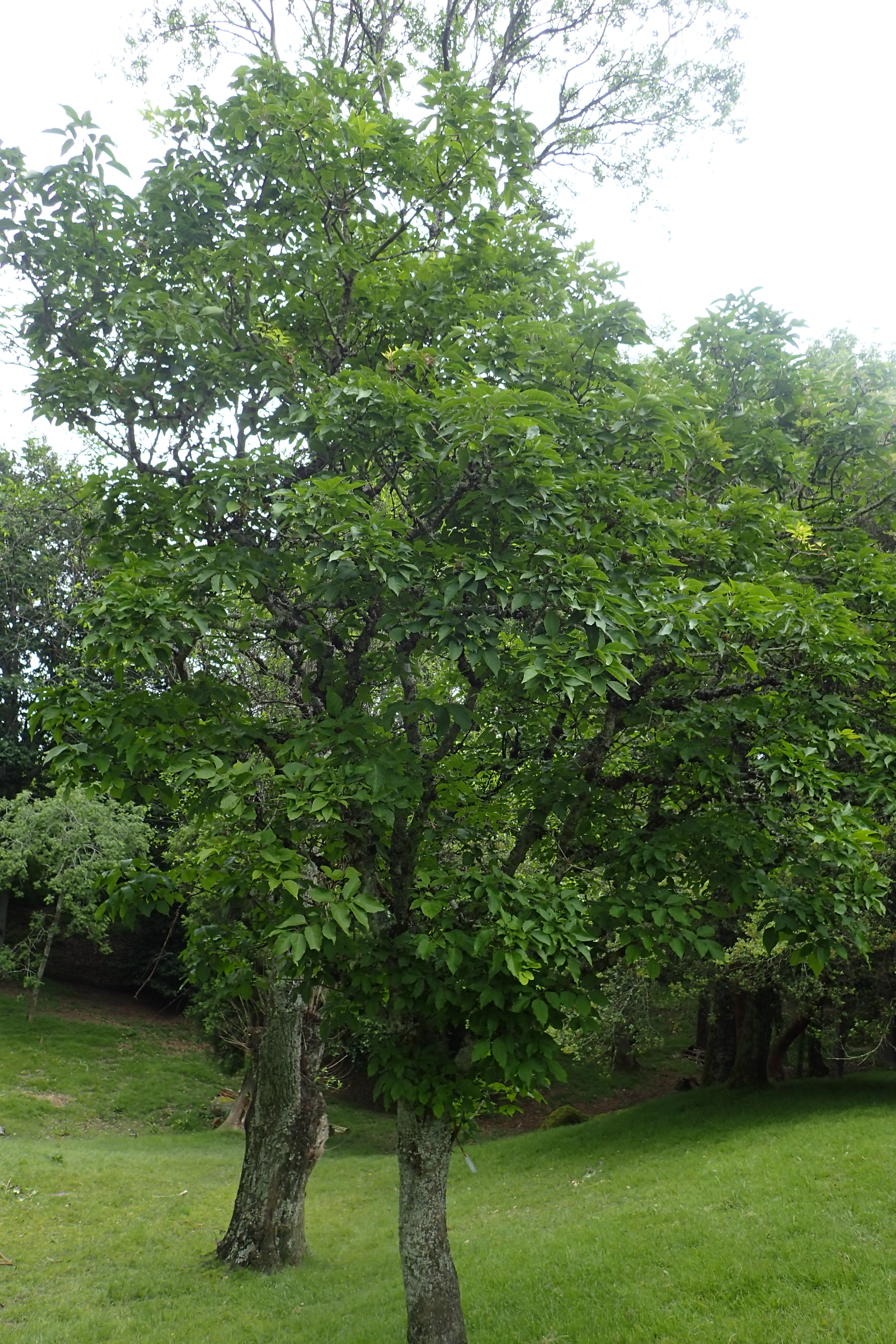

Conservation status
- Least Concern (IUCN 3.1)

Scientific classification
- Kingdom: Plantae
- Clade: Tracheophytes
- Clade: Angiosperms
- Clade: Eudicots
- Clade: Asterids
- Order: Lamiales
- Family: Oleaceae
- Genus: Fraxinus
- Section: Fraxinus sect. Ornus
- Species: F. chinensis

Binomial name
- Fraxinus chinensis Roxb.

= Fraxinus chinensis =

Species of flowering plant

Fraxinus chinensis, the Chinese ash, is a species of ash tree. Its leaves are used in traditional Chinese medicine for dysentery disorders, and it can be used as cultivator of the white scale insects (Ericerus pela) for candle making.

Fraxinus chinensis is dioecious, with male and female flowers produced on separate individuals.
