= Bikasha collaris =

Scientific classification
- Kingdom: Animalia
- Phylum: Arthropoda
- Clade: Pancrustacea
- Class: Insecta
- Order: Coleoptera
- Suborder: Polyphaga
- Infraorder: Cucujiformia
- Family: Chrysomelidae
- Subfamily: Galerucinae
- Tribe: Alticini
- Genus: Bikasha
- Species: B. collaris

Binomial name
- Bikasha collaris (Baly, 1877)

Species of beetle

Bikasha collaris is a species of flea beetle in the family Chrysomelidae. It is found in China, Taiwan, and Japan.

It has been considered as a biological control for an invasive tree Chinese Tallow (Triadica sebifera) by the USDA due to its specialist feeding.

== Description ==
B. collaris adults have a yellowish-red head and a black notum. The eggs are light yellow and glassy. The larvae emerges as light yellow and darkens as they grow. The pupae are initially white, but as they age, the hind legs and eyes become darker.

== Natural history ==
B. collaris adults feed on the leaves of T. sebifera. Each adult produces about 25.5 ± 1.5 feeding holes per day. The larvae feed mainly on young roots and stems, making tunnels. Mature larvae leave the roots and move to the soil to pupate. It takes the larvae an average of 17.9 ± 0.3 days to reach the pupal stage, which average 8.6 ± 0.2 days.

Mating is frequently observed after a preoviposition period of 6.3 ± 0.3 days. The embryonic development takes on average 8.7 ± 0.1 days.
