= Stillingia tallow =

Fatty substance extracted from the coat of seeds

Stillingia tallow or Chinese vegetable tallow is a fatty substance extracted from the coat of the seeds of Triadica sebifera (Chinese tallow tree) or Triadica cochinchinensis (Mountain tallow tree). It has traditionally been used for making candles. This product must be distinguished from stillingia oil, that is extracted from the seeds of those trees.

The name of the substance was given when the two plants were classified in the genus Stillingia, with binomial names "Stillingia sebifera" and "Stillingia discolor". Sometime prior to 1950 the species were reclassified in the genus Sapium, and articles from the 1950s still use the names "Sapium sebiferum" and "Sapium discolor" However, since about 2002 the plants have been reclassified again in the genus Triadica, and the second one had its species name changed to "cochinchinensis".

The fruit of T. sebifera has a characteristic trilobed shape and contains three seeds surrounded by a fibrous waxy coating, which contains the vegetable tallow fat. The seeds produce 20-30% w/w of tallow fat and 10-17% w/w of stillingia oil.

== Composition ==
Stillingia tallow is essentially a mixture of triglycerides (esters of glycerol and fatty acids). The main triglycerides are glicerotriyl tripalmitate (5-30%) and 2-oleate,1,3-dipalmitate (~70%).

== Uses ==
The "tallow" is reported to be edible, and may have applications in confectionery. However, it is not commonly used for that purpose; and the risk of contamination by the seed oil, which is toxic, is a possible concern.
