= Bikasha =

Scientific classification
- Domain: Eukaryota
- Kingdom: Animalia
- Phylum: Arthropoda
- Class: Insecta
- Order: Coleoptera
- Suborder: Polyphaga
- Infraorder: Cucujiformia
- Family: Chrysomelidae
- Subfamily: Galerucinae
- Tribe: Alticini
- Genus: Bikasha; Maulik, 1931

Type species
- Bikasha tenuipunctata Maulik, 1931

Synonyms
- Aphthonomorpha Chen, 1934; Manobidia Chen, 1934

Genus of beetles

Bikasha is a genus of flea beetles in the family Chrysomelidae. There are 19 described species from the Seychelles and the Oriental realm.

== Species ==
The genus contains 19 described species:

- Bikasha antennata (Chen, 1934)
- Bikasha atra (Medvedev, 1992)
- Bikasha collaris (Baly, 1877)
- Bikasha fortipunctata Maulik, 1931
- Bikasha intermedia (Chen, 1934)
- Bikasha lankana (Medvedev, 2001)
- Bikasha laosensis (Medvedev, 2000)
- Bikasha major (Kimoto, 2001)
- Bikasha manilensis (Medvedev, 1993)
- Bikasha minor Maulik, 1931
- Bikasha minuta (Chen, 1934)
- Bikasha nepalica (Medvedev, 2007)
- Bikasha nigripes (Medvedev, 2016)
- Bikasha nipponica (Chujo, 1959)
- Bikasha pallida (Medvedev, 1994)
- Bikasha puncticollis (Medvedev, 1993)
- Bikasha simplicithorax (Chen, 1934)
- Bikasha tenuipunctata Maulik, 1931
- Bikasha violaceipennis (Medvedev, 1992)
