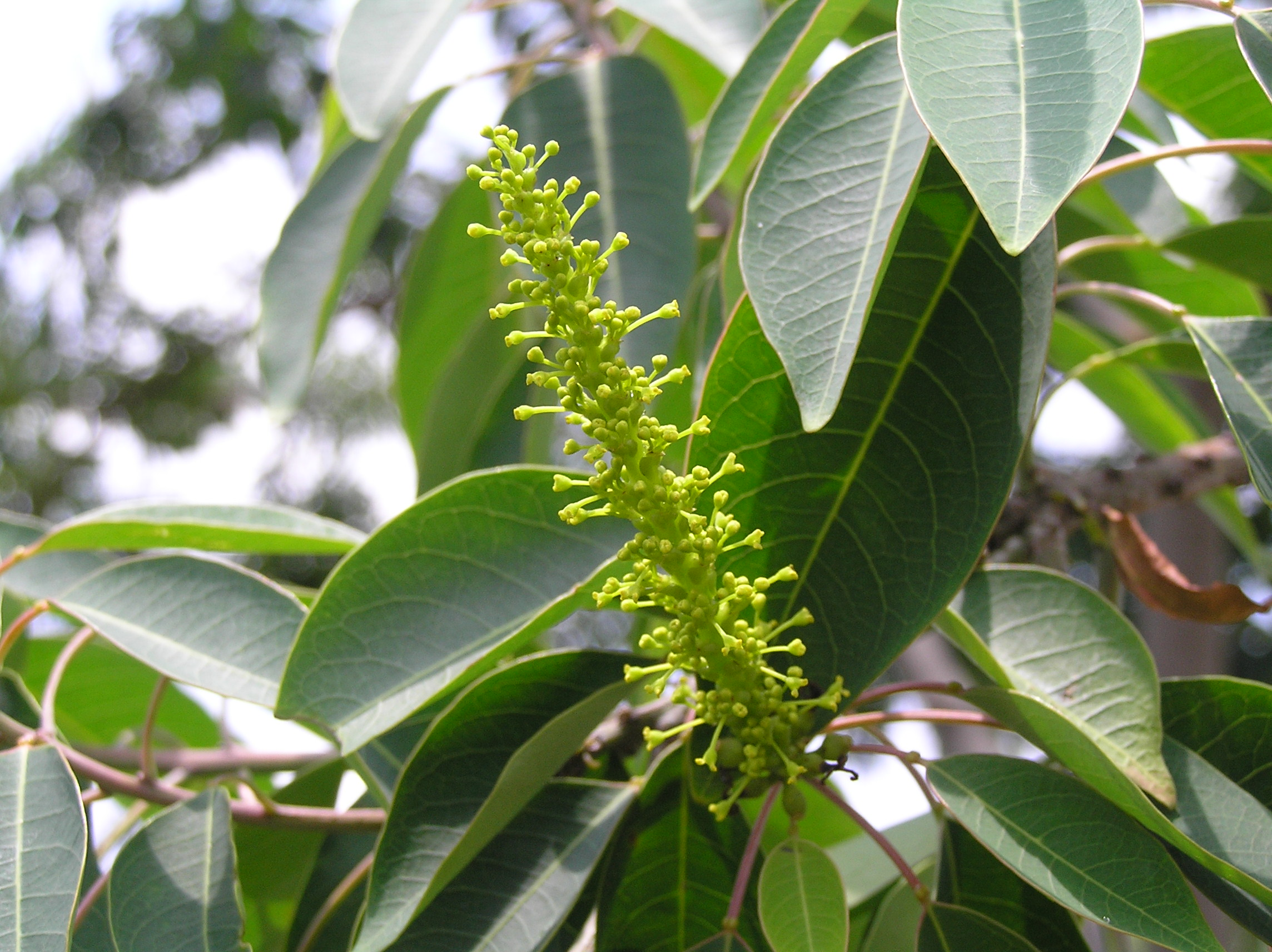
- Sapium discolor

Conservation status
- Least Concern (IUCN 3.1)

Scientific classification
- Kingdom: Plantae
- Clade: Tracheophytes
- Clade: Angiosperms
- Clade: Eudicots
- Clade: Rosids
- Order: Malpighiales
- Family: Euphorbiaceae
- Genus: Triadica
- Species: T. cochinchinensis

Binomial name
- Triadica cochinchinensis Lour.

Synonyms
- List: Excoecaria loureiroana Müll.Arg.; Sapium cochinchinense (Lour.) Gagnep.; Shirakia cochinchinensis (Lour.) Hurus.; Stillingia cochinchinensis (Lour.) Baill.; Excoecaria discolor (Champ. ex Benth.) Müll.Arg.; Excoecaria lanceolaria (Miq.) Müll.Arg.; Sapium discolor (Champ. ex Benth.) Müll.Arg.; Sapium discolor var. wenhsienensis S.B.Ho; Sapium eugeniifolium Buch.-Ham. ex Hook.f.; Sapium hookeri Hook.f.; Sapium laui Croizat; Stillingia discolor Champ. ex Benth.; Stillingia lanceolaria Miq.

= Triadica cochinchinensis =

Species of tree

Triadica cochinchinensis is a species of flowering plant in the spurge family, Euphorbiaceae. This tree is sometimes referred to by the common name mountain tallow tree.

The seeds (as well as from those of Triadica sebifera) are the sources of stillingia oil, a drying oil used in paints and varnishes. The fatty coat of the seeds is known as stillingia tallow, hence its common name.

The two species were formerly classified in the genus Stillingia, as Stillingia discolor and Stillingia sebifera (hence the name of the oil and tallow). At some time before 1950, this tree was reclassified into the genus Sapium as Sapium discolor. In 2002 or so it was reclassified again into the genus Triadica with its present name.

== Distribution ==
It is native to Assam, Bangladesh, Borneo, Cambodia, South-Central and Southeast China, Himalaya, Hainan, India, Indonesia, Laos, Malaysia, Myanmar, Nepal, the Philippines, Taiwan, Thailand, and Vietnam.
