= Chinese wax =

Substance obtained from insect wax

Chinese wax, insect wax (Chinese: 蟲蠟), white wax or pela (Chinese: 白蠟) is a white to yellowish-white, gelatinous, crystalline water-insoluble substance obtained from the wax secreted by certain insects. It may be used for the production of candles and polishes, and for the sizing of paper. It resembles spermaceti but is harder, more friable, and with a higher melting point.

== Production ==
Two scale insects produce the wax: Ceroplastes ceriferus, common in China and India, and the related Ericerus pela, found in China and Japan. These insects deposit their secretions on the branches of certain species of Ligustrum (privet) tree, and on the branches of Fraxinus chinensis, or Chinese ash. The insects and their secretions are harvested and boiled with water to extract the raw wax. The insect bodies, which settle to the bottom, are used as food for swine.

A description of the cultivation of the insect for wax production is given in a November 1932 article from the Nature Magazine:

...the male larvae of a white insect, about the size of a mosquito, built a cocoon of pure, shining wax. The tree that produces the white wax insect grows in the Chien-Chang Valley, and there, about march, one may see, on the limbs and branches, round, brown forms, which contain innumerable white insects. If they are allowed to remain where they are, they will eventually drop off in a dead mass, for the food is not right for them; but if they are transported to other kinds of plants, the females will lay their eggs, the larvae will thrive and the male larvae will construct their shining palaces, which yield a profit to the wax-farmers. So, late in March, the insects are tied up in a leaf of the wood oil tree, then placed in gourd like receptacles which are packed into two large bamboo baskets. Runners or porters lift the baskets on their shoulders, and, traveling entirely at night – for to submit the insects to the midday heat would cause the pupal stage to end too soon – traverse the rocky paths and lofty ascents of the Cze-Chuan Mountains to arrive finally at the farming districts.

The baskets of insects are distributed to the farmers, who proceed at once to place the creatures upon the food plant, which is generally a species of flowering ash about five or six feet high. They are tied to the branches in small bags made of leaves, and holes are punched in the bags with a blunt needle so the adults may find their way out. When first emerging, the insects creep rapidly up to the leaves of the food plant, where they nestle for nearly two weeks. After this they begin to scatter and crawl along the branches.

About the first of June, the females begin to lay their eggs, and the wax cocoons are formed in August in time completely coating every branch and stem. By the first of September the whole tree is literally covered with layers of pure white wax a quarter of an inch thick. The farmers then scrape the branches, and prepare the wax of the market.

— Herbert Beardsley

The substance scraped off the branches is boiled in water, where the wax collects on the surface. The wax is later remelted and poured into a deep pan, where it is allowed to cool to form a transparent crystalline mass. This crystalline substance produced by E. pela is white in colour but may have a slight yellowish tinge, and it has no taste or smell. Each insect can produce around ~0.45 mg of wax on the tree, and annually, 300 to 500 tons of the wax may be produced in the industry.

== Uses ==
Chinese wax is mainly used in candle production. It is also sometimes used for burnishing the back of Chinese hanging scrolls with a stone, and in cosmetics in China and Japan. In Japan, it is used to polish white clamshell go stones among other uses.

In China the wax has been employed medicinally. It may be ingested as a remedy for hoarseness, pain, worms, nervousness, and to aid the mending of broken bones. It may also be applied externally as an ointment for treatment of wounds.

== Other names ==
Other names for Chinese wax include:

- Chinese insect wax
- Chinese tree wax
- Chinese white wax
- Insect wax

In Japan the tree yielding it is called ibota and the wax ibotaro.
