= Advent candle =

Candle marked with the days of December up to Christmas Eve

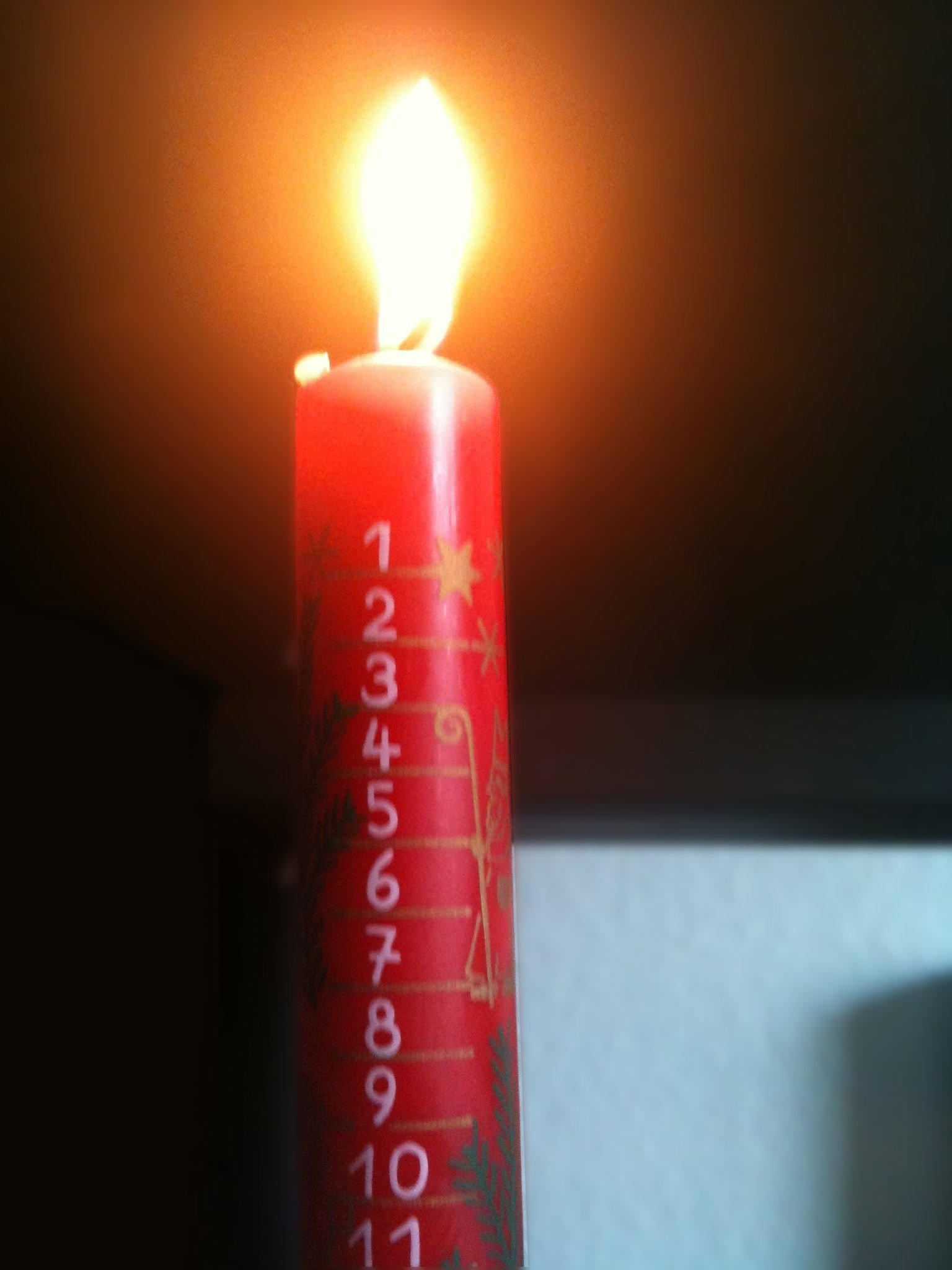
Advent candle

An Advent candle is a candle marked with the days of December up to Christmas Eve. It is typically used in a household rather than a church setting: each day in December the candle is burnt down a little more, to the mark for the day, to show the passing of the days leading up to Christmas. As with reusable Advent calendars, some Advent candles start marking the days from 1 December, rather than the exact beginning of Advent. Some households will make a Christmas decoration out of sprigs of evergreen and Christmas ornaments, with the candle at its center; others will simply put it in a candlestick. It is usually burned at the family evening meal each day.

Advent candles are traditionally white, though other Christmas-themed colors have become popular. The custom of having an Advent candle seems to have started in Germany, where children traditionally insert a small candle into a decorated orange. This candle is called the Christingle. It is now widespread in some other European countries such as the United Kingdom.
