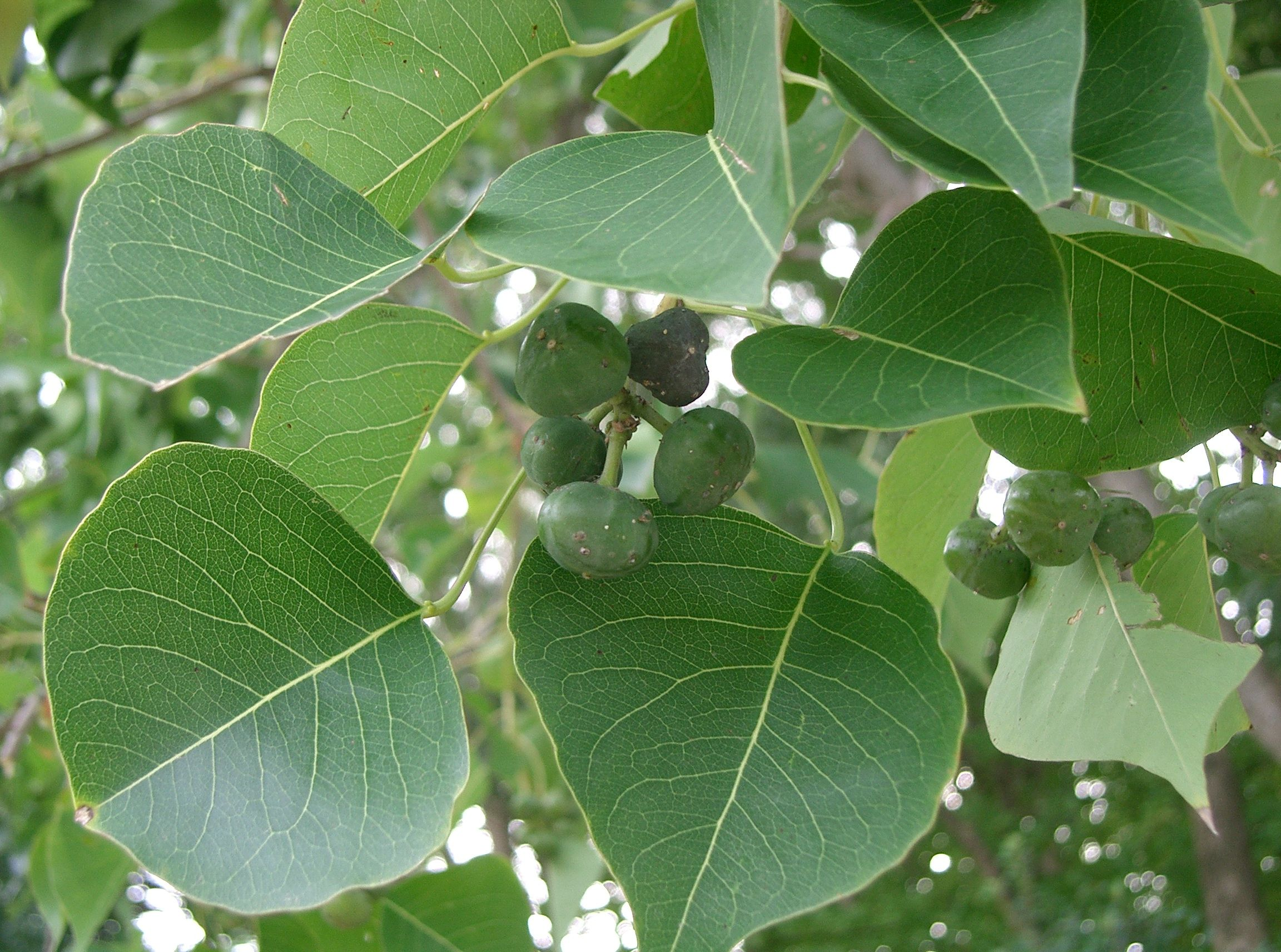
- Triadica sebifera

Scientific classification
- Kingdom: Plantae
- Clade: Tracheophytes
- Clade: Angiosperms
- Clade: Eudicots
- Clade: Rosids
- Order: Malpighiales
- Family: Euphorbiaceae
- Subfamily: Euphorbioideae
- Tribe: Hippomaneae
- Subtribe: Hippomaninae
- Genus: Triadica; Lour.

Synonyms
- Stillingfleetia Bojer; Carumbium Kurz 1877, illegitimate homonym, not Reinw. 1828; Sapium sect. Triadica (Loureiro) Müller Argoviensis.

= Triadica =

Genus of flowering plants

Triadica is a plant genus of the family Euphorbiaceae first described as a genus in 1790. It is native to eastern, southeastern, and southern Asia.

Species included are:

1. Triadica cochinchinensis Lour. - China (Anhui, Fujian, Guangdong, Guangxi, Guizhou, Hainan, Hubei, Hunan, Jiangxi, Sichuan, Taiwan, Yunnan, Zhejiang), Cambodia, Assam, Bangladesh, Bhutan, Nepal, Himalayas of E + N India, Borneo, Sulawesi, Sumatra, Laos, Malaysia, Myanmar, Philippines, Thailand, Vietnam
2. Triadica rotundifolia (Hemsl.) Esser - Guangdong
3. Triadica sebifera (L.) Small - China (Anhui, Fujian, Gansu, Guangdong, Guangxi, Guizhou, Hainan, Hubei, Jiangxi, Jiangsu, Shaanxi, Shandong, Sichuan, Taiwan, Yunnan, Zhejiang), Japan; naturalized in Himalayas, Cuba, Puerto Rico, SE + SC USA, Sacramento Valley in N California

A species formerly included but moved to Neoshirakia is:

- Triadica japonica (Siebold & Zucc.) Baill. - Neoshirakia japonica (Siebold & Zucc.) Esser
