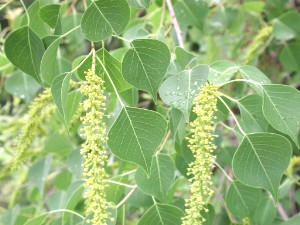
- Leaves and buds

Conservation status
- Least Concern (IUCN 3.1)

Scientific classification
- Kingdom: Plantae
- Clade: Tracheophytes
- Clade: Angiosperms
- Clade: Eudicots
- Clade: Rosids
- Order: Malpighiales
- Family: Euphorbiaceae
- Genus: Triadica
- Species: T. sebifera

Binomial name
- Triadica sebifera (L.) Small

Synonyms
- Croton sebiferum L.; Sapium sebiferum (L.) Roxb.

= Triadica sebifera =

Species of tree

Triadica sebifera is a tree native to eastern Asia (Chinese 乌桕, wū jiù). It is commonly called Chinese tallow, Chinese tallowtree, Florida aspen, chicken tree, gray popcorn tree, or candleberry tree.

The seeds (as well as from those of Triadica cochinchinensis) are the sources of stillingia oil, a drying oil used in paints and varnishes. The fatty coat of the seeds, used for candle and soap making, is known as stillingia tallow; hence its common name. It is relevant to biodiesel production because it is the third most productive vegetable oil producing crop in the world, after algae and oil palm. The leaves are used as herbal medicine to treat boils. The plant sap and leaves are reputed to be toxic, and decaying leaves from the plant are toxic to other species of plants. The species is classified as a noxious invader in the southern U.S.

This species and T. cochinchinensis were formerly classified in the genus Stillingia, as Stillingia sebifera and Stillingia discolor (hence the name still used for the oil and tallow). The specific epithet sebifera is derived from Latin sebum (meaning "tallow") and fero (meaning "to bear"), thus "tallow-bearing". At some time before 1950, this tree was reclassified into the genus Sapium as Sapium sebiferum, and many papers about the oil still refer to the tree by this name. In 2002 or so it was reclassified again into the genus Triadica with its present name.

== Description ==
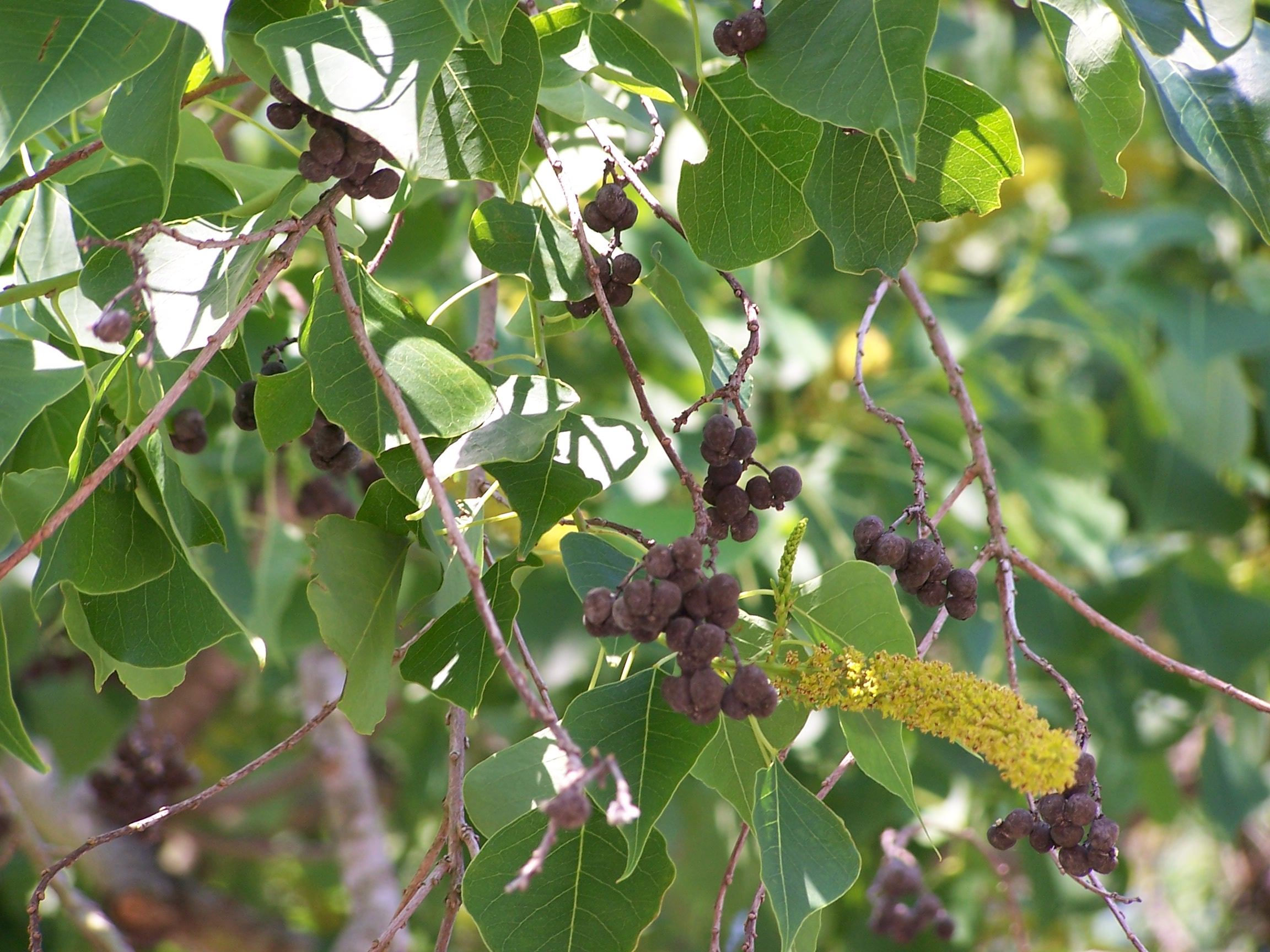
Seed capsules

The simple, deciduous leaves of this tree are alternate, broad rhombic to ovate in shape and have smooth edges, heart shaped and sometimes with an extended tail often resembling the bo tree, Ficus religiosa. The leaves are bright green in color and slightly paler underneath. They become bright yellows, oranges, purples and reds in the autumn. The tree is monoecious, producing male and female flowers on the same plant.

The waxy green leaves set off the clusters of greenish-yellow and white flowers at bloom time. The flowers occur in terminal spike-like inflorescences up to 20 cm long. Light green in color, these flowers are very conspicuous in the spring. Each pistillate (female) flower is solitary and has a three-lobed ovary, three styles, and no petals. They are located on short branches at the base of the spike. The staminate (male) flowers occur in clusters at the upper nodes of the inflorescence.

Fruits are three-lobed, three-valved capsules. As the capsules mature, their color changes from green to a brown-black. The capsule walls fall away and release three globose seeds, about 12 mm in diameter and weighing about 0.15 g, with a white, tallow-containing covering. Seeds usually hang on the plants for several weeks. In North America, the flowers typically mature from April to June and the fruit ripens from September to October.

== Range and habitat ==
Triadica sebifera is native to China, probably originally in the Zhejiang area, and it was described in the Tang pharmacopoeia Xinxiu bencao. Cultivation of the tree may have begun in the 7th century during the Tang dynasty in the Yangtze Delta region, and from there it spread westward and southward. The trees reached the Philippines, Taiwan, northern Vietnam and Hainan by the 17th century. It was also introduced to Japan during the Edo period. By the 18th century, it had spread to India, the Caribbean islands, and South Carolina and Georgia in the United States through the East India Company. It is also found in Sudan, and southern France.

The tree was said to have been introduced to the US by Benjamin Franklin, who mentioned having obtained some seeds in a letter dated October 1772, but it may have actually been introduced to South Carolina, Georgia and Florida in early 1773 by John Bradby Blake who had access to the seeds earlier in late 1770 or early 1771. The tree has become naturalized from North Carolina southward along the Atlantic seaboard and the entire Gulf Coast, where it grows profusely along ditchbanks and dikes. It grows especially well in open fields and abandoned farmland coastal prairie regions featuring disturbed ground—such as abandoned farmland, spoil banks, roadsides, and storm-damaged forests—and along the edges of the Western Gulf coastal grasslands biome, sometimes forming monocultures. The Chinese Tallow Tree is listed as an invasive species in South Carolina.

== Uses ==
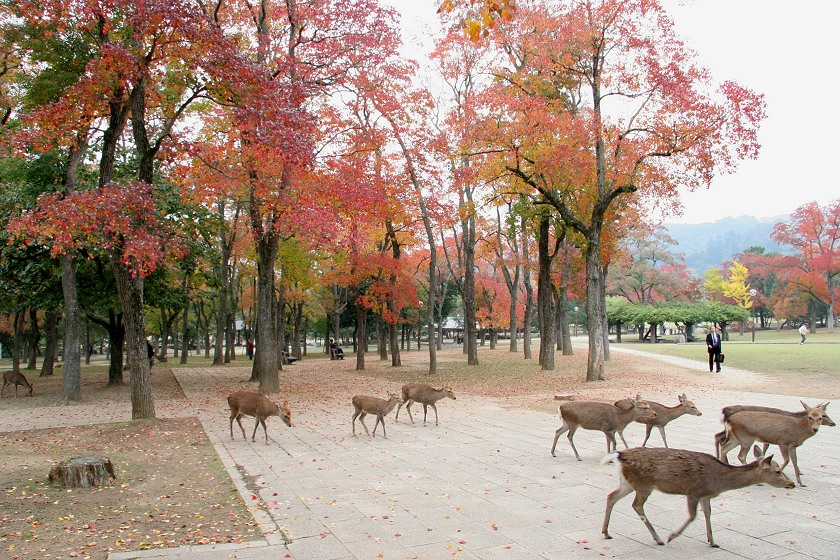
Triadica sebifera in autumn, Japan

The seed's white waxy aril is used in soap making (stillingia tallow). While the seed's inner oil (stillingia oil) is toxic but has industrial applications in the manufacturing of cloth dressing and drying oils.

The nectar is non-toxic, and it has become a major honey plant for beekeepers. The honey produced from the plant is reputedly clear and of high quality. It is produced copiously during the month of June on the US Gulf Coast. In that region, beekeepers migrate with their honey bees to good tallow locations near the gulf.

The tree is ornamental, fast growing, and provides shade. It is especially noteworthy if grown in areas that have strong seasonal temperature ranges with the leaves becoming a multitude of colours rivaling maples in the autumn. It is not choosy about soil types or drainage, but will not grow in deep shade. It has naturalized all over in Japan, and is reasonably hardy. It should not be planted outside of its native range due to its invasive tendencies.

== Invasive species ==
The tallow tree is a non-native species to many places around the world. Its introduced status in North America along with the harm it causes to ecosystems makes the tree considered an invasive species there. Tallow trees present a danger of expansion that can hurt local ecosystems by out-competing native vegetation and creating a monoculture. The monoculture lowers species diversity and overall resilience of the area. The tree's tenacious nature, high growth rates, and high reproductive ability contribute to its invasive success. According to the U.S. Department of Agriculture, tallow trees begin producing viable seed in as soon as three years. They can spread by root sprouts and cuttings and are quick to invade after a disturbance occurs in an area, due to the clearing out of land. A single tallow tree can produce nearly 100,000 viable seeds annually that can remain in the soil for several years before sprouting. A mature stand can produce 4,500 kilograms of seeds per hectare per year. These seeds are easily carried to different places by birds and water. Tallow trees can remain productive for 100 years. It is also extremely hard to kill—its poisonous features in its leaves and berries leave it with few to no predators, and its short generation time means even freshly cut trees can quickly regrow. Currently, herbicides and prescribed fire are the only effective treatments available to contain and control Chinese tallow. The USDA is evaluating the flea beetle (Bikasha collaris) as a natural control agent.

In the Houston area, Chinese tallow trees account for a full 23 percent of all trees, more than any other tree species and is the only invasive tree species in the 14 most common species in the area. The Texas Department of Agriculture lists Chinese Tallow as one of the 24 most invasive plants, and includes Chinese Tallow in a list of Noxious and Invasive Plants which are illegal to sell, distribute or import into Texas. Herbivores and insects have a conditioned behavioral avoidance to eating the leaves of Chinese tallow tree, and this, rather than plant toxins, may be a reason for the success of the plant as an invasive.

In Europe, the species features on the Union list of invasive alien species. This means it is now illegal to import or sell this plant in the European Union.

== Biological control ==
In parts of the USA, biological control of the Chinese tallow tree has been considered, using the flea beetle Bikasha collaris, whose larvae attack the roots, and the moth Gadirtha fusca, whose caterpillars attack the leaves. In those areas, the resulting prospect of losing the Chinese tallow as a honey source has caused concern in beekeepers.

== Synonyms and former names ==
The species has several synonyms and former names:

- Carumbium sebiferum (L.) Kurz, Forest Fl. Burma 2: 411, 412. 1877.
- Croton sebiferh. ("sebiferus"), Sp. Pl.: 1004. 1753.
- Excoecaria sebifera (L.) Müll.Arg. in DC., Prodr. 15(2): 1210. 1866.
- Stillingia sebifera (L.) Michx., Fl. Bor.-Amer. 2: 213. 1803.
- Sapium chihsinianum S. K. Lee, Acta Phytotax. Sin. 5: 121, pl. 22. 1956.
- Sapium discolor var. wenhsienensis S. B. Ho, Fl. Tsingliensis 1(3): 451, fig. 155. 1981.
- Sapium pleiocarpum Y. C. Tseng, Acta Phytotax. Sin. 20: 105, fig. 1. 1982.
- Sapium sebiferum (L.) Roxb., Fl. Ind. Ed. 1832, 3: 693. 1832.
  - Sapium sebiferum var. cordatum S. Y. Wang, Fl. Henan 2: 480. 1988.
  - Sapium sebiferum var. dabeshense B. C. Ding & T. B. Chao, Fl. Henan 2: 481. 1988.
  - Sapium sebiferum var. multiracemosum B. C. Ding & T. B. Chao, Fl. Henan 2: 480, fig. 1394. 1988.
  - Sapium sebiferum var. pendulum B. C. Ding & T. B. Chao, Fl. Henan 2: 481. 1988.
- Seborium chínense Raf., Sylva Tellur.: 63. 1838, nomen superfl.
- Seborium sebiferum (L.) Hurus., Bot. Mag. (Tokyo) 61: 30. 1948.
- Triadica sinensis Lour., Fl. Cochinch.: 610. 1790.
