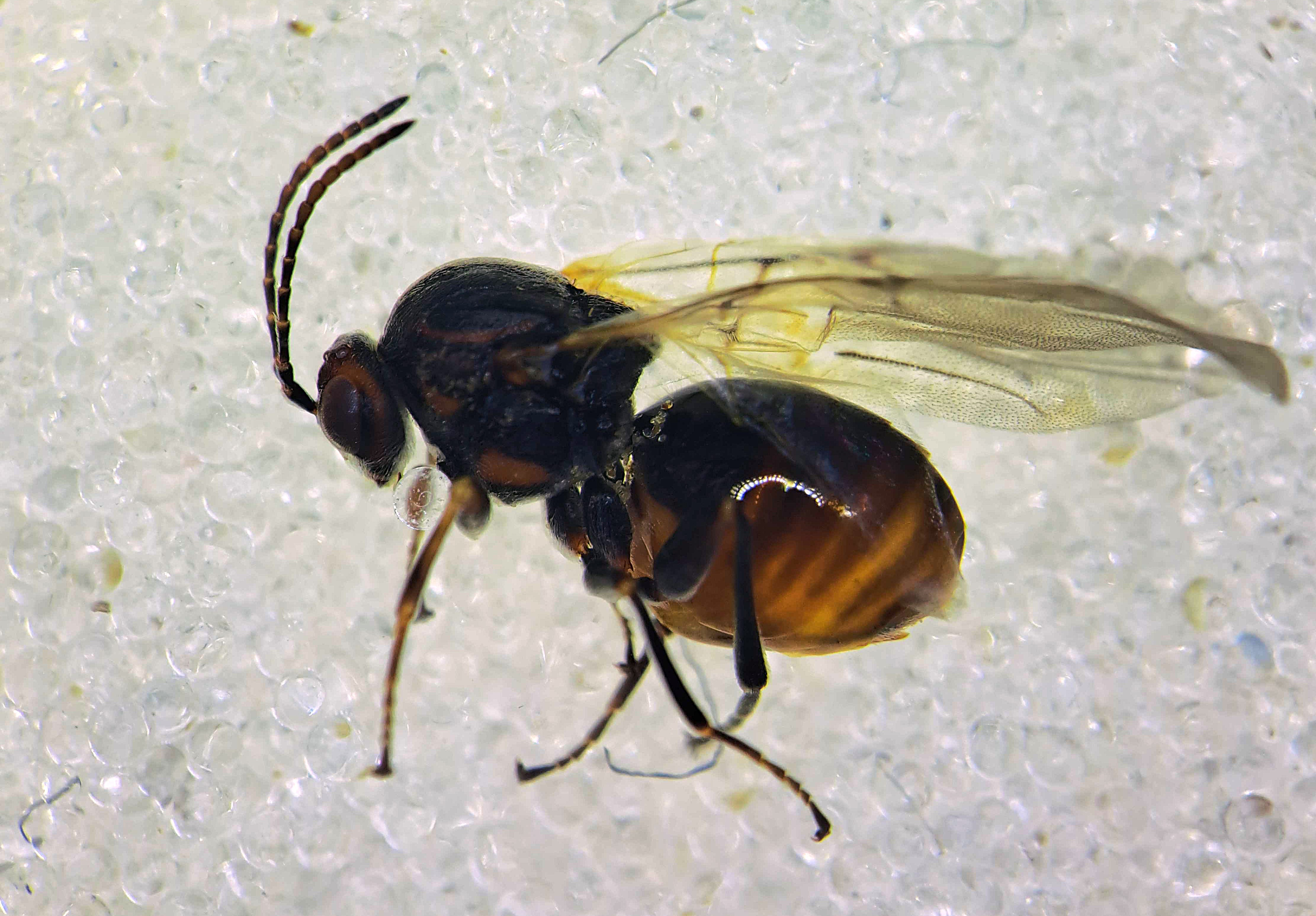
- Adult wasp of the asexual generation
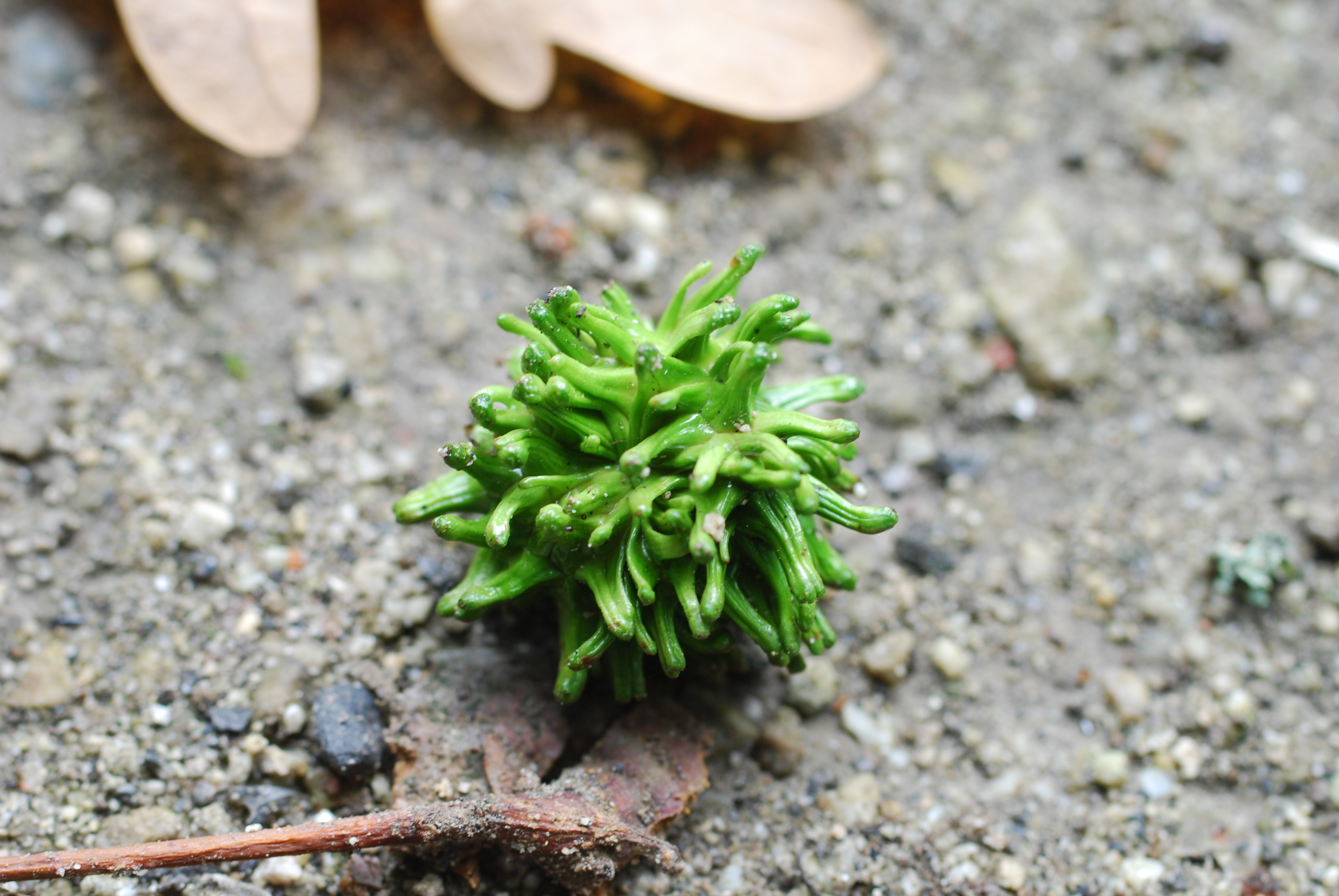
- Fully developed agamic gall on ground

Scientific classification
- Kingdom: Animalia
- Phylum: Arthropoda
- Clade: Pancrustacea
- Class: Insecta
- Order: Hymenoptera
- Family: Cynipidae
- Genus: Andricus
- Species: A. grossulariae

Binomial name
- Andricus grossulariae Giraud, 1859

= Andricus grossulariae =

Species of wasp

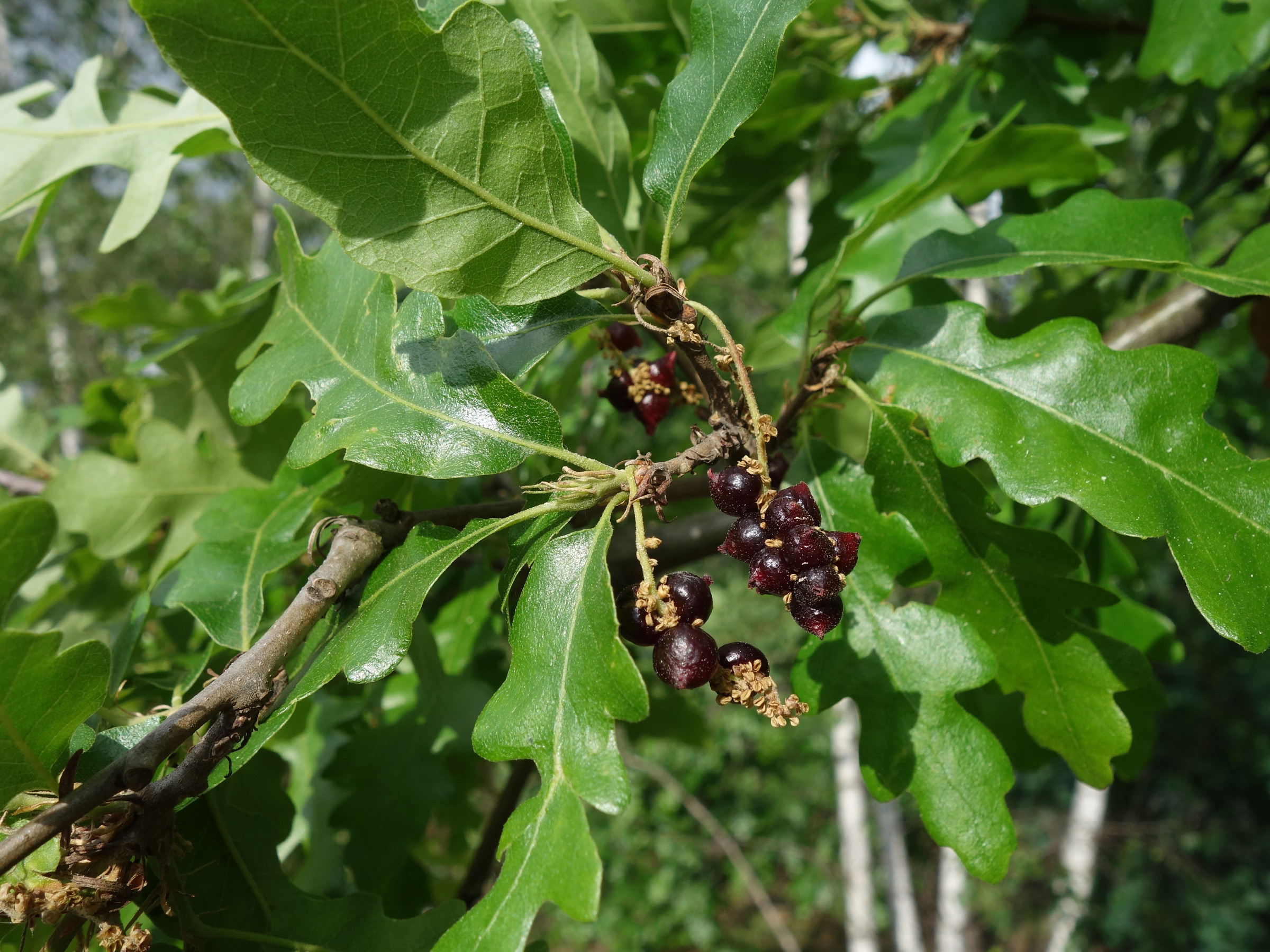
Galls of the sexual generation on Quercus cerris

Andricus grossulariae is a gall wasp species inducing agamic acorn cup galls on oak tree acorn cups and sexual phase galls on catkins. Synonyms include Andricus fructuum (Trotter, 1899), Andricus gemellus (Belizin & Maisuradze, 1961), Andricus intermedius (Tavares, 1922), Andricus mayri (Wachtl, 1879) and Cynips panteli (Kieffer, 1897).

== Galls ==
Acorn cup galls develop as a chemically induced distortion of the growing acorn cups on oak trees, caused by gall wasps which lay eggs within the tissues of the acorn cup.

The sexual phase appears on catkins as rounded structures (6 mm × 3–4 mm) possessing a characteristic point, and are covered with fine hairs when young. The galls, shiny and hard, turn red in colour, and then black or dark purple.

The asexual or parthenogenetic phase, about 10 mm across, develops on acorn cups of English oak Q. robur and sessile oak Q. petraea. The galls, formed of flattened projections, often enclose the immature acorn. The galls first appear pink in colour and as they mature they turn red, then green and finally brown during their development. Previously this asexual stage was known as Andricus mayri (Wachtl).

Although normally distinctive, the asexual acorn cup gall can, under some growth conditions, be mistaken for the knopper gall (Andricus quercuscalicis).

A. grossulariae, although usually found on acorns, is also found on buds.

== Life cycle ==
Two forms of galls exist for this species, the asexual phase inducing the acorn cup gall on the cups in late summer, and the sexual phase inducing rounded galls on the oak catkins in spring.

== Parasitoids and inquilines ==
One study identified twenty-four parasitoids from galls of A. grossulariae, such as Torymus auratus, Megastigmus dorsalis, Ormyrus pomaceus, Sycophila variegata, Sycophila biguttata, Mesopolobus xanthocerus, and Aulogymnus trilineatus. Ceroptres cerri is an inquiline of A. grossulariae.

== Distribution ==
A. grossulariae has been recorded from across Europe from Ireland to Portugal to Turkey, and in some areas of the Near East, as far as northern Iraq. A. grossulariae was first observed in Britain in Berkshire in 2000.

== See also ==
- Cola-nut gall
- Oak apple
- Oak artichoke gall
- Oak marble gall
