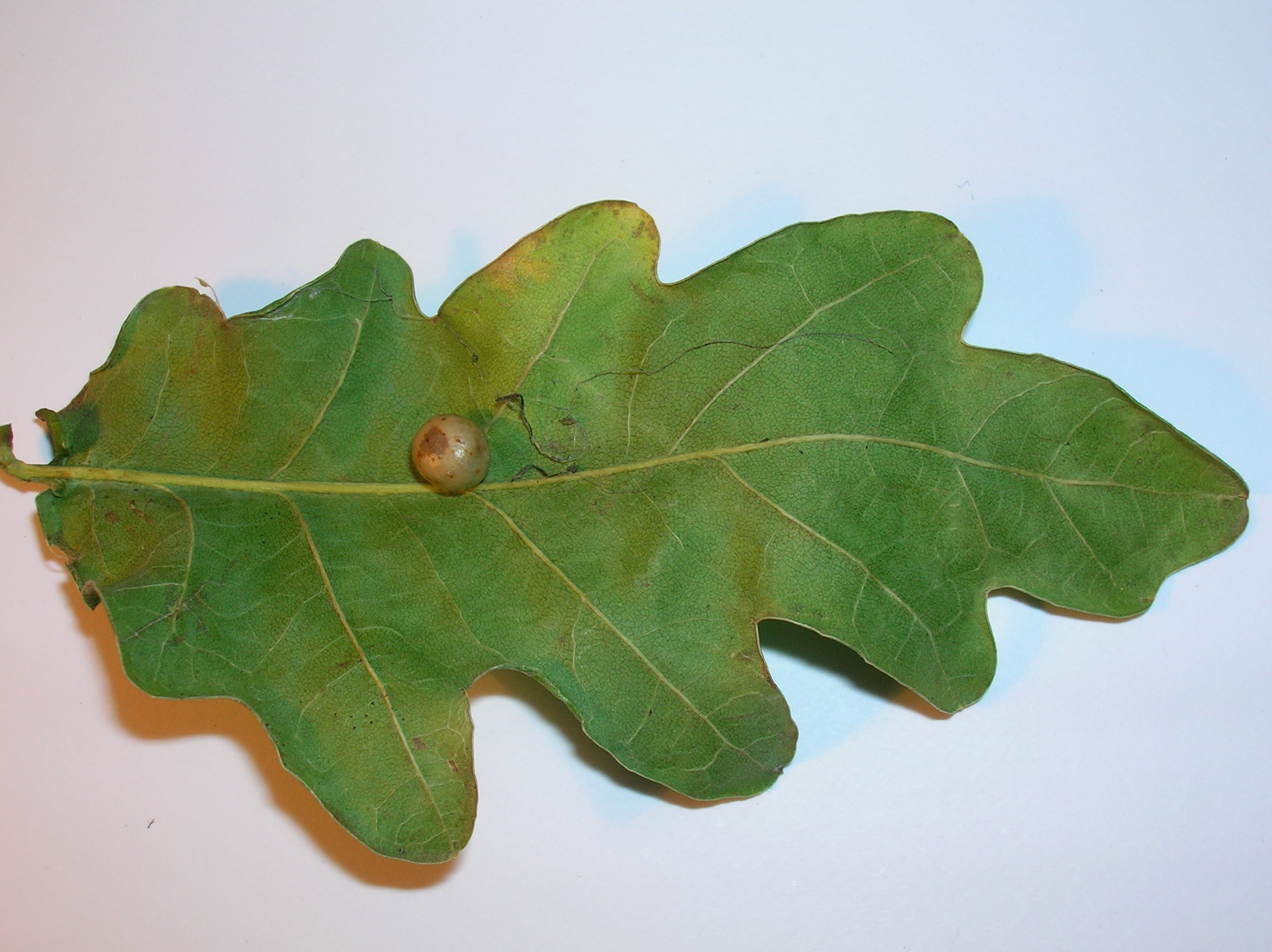
- Mature gall on a leaf of Quercus robur

Scientific classification
- Domain: Eukaryota
- Kingdom: Animalia
- Phylum: Arthropoda
- Class: Insecta
- Order: Hymenoptera
- Family: Cynipidae
- Genus: Cynips
- Species: C. divisa

Binomial name
- Cynips divisa Hartig, 1840

= Red-pea gall =

Species of wasp

The red-pea gall or red currant gall develops as a chemically induced distortion arising from the underside of the mid-rib of a vein on Quercus species and it is attached by a short stalk or peduncle. The red-wart gall is the sexual phase of the same species.

== Cause ==
The gall is caused by the parthenogenetic generation of Cynips divisa, which has been known by the synonyms Diplolepis divisa, Dryophanta divisa and Spathegaster verrucosus.

== Appearance ==
In appearance it is glossy and somewhat flattened sphere and from ten to fifteen or so may occur on a single leaf. The average size is 5 by 6 millimetres (0.20 in × 0.24 in) and the colouring starts as green, passing to yellow, orange and then red-brown; the season is midsummer onwards. Circular emergence holes appear in the galls.

== Life cycle ==
Many of the agamic imagines emerge in October. After overwintering, Cynips develops eggs parthenogenetically and their eggs develop in live buds as 'red-wart galls'. The infested buds become yellow, orange or a russet colour and are about 4 mm (0.16 in) long. These red-wart galls appear in May and the males and females of the bisexual generation emerge in June and produce the fertilized eggs which undergo development in the red-pea galls.

== Gall-forming insects ==
Some herbivorous insects therefore create their own microhabitats by forming, in this case, a highly distinctive plant structure called a gall, made up of plant tissue, but controlled by the insect. Galls act as both the habitat, and food sources for the maker of the gall. The interior of a bedeguar gall is formed from the bud, and is composed of edible nutritious and structural tissues. Some galls act as "physiologic sinks", concentrating resources in the gall from the surrounding plant parts. Galls may also provide the insect with some physical protection from predators.

== Inquilines and parasites ==
These occur commonly in this native species.

== See also ==
- Cola-nut gall
- Knopper gall
- Oak apple
- Oak artichoke gall
- Oak marble gall
