= Quercus × kewensis =

- Herbarium specimen

Scientific classification
- Kingdom: Plantae
- Clade: Tracheophytes
- Clade: Angiosperms
- Clade: Eudicots
- Clade: Rosids
- Order: Fagales
- Family: Fagaceae
- Genus: Quercus
- Species: Q. × kewensis

Binomial name
- Quercus × kewensis Osborn

Species of plant

Quercus × kewensis, the Kew oak, is an artificial hybrid species of flowering plant in the family Fagaceae. It arose spontaneously from crosses of Quercus wislizeni (the seed parent, from California) and Q. cerris (the pollen parent, from Turkey) growing in Kew Gardens, England. An evergreen tree reaching 15 m (50 ft), it has gained the Royal Horticultural Society's Award of Garden Merit.
