= Arthur Osborn =

Arthur Osborn may refer to:

- Arthur Osborn (murderer)
- Arthur Osborn (botanist)

== See also ==
- Arthur Osborne (disambiguation)
