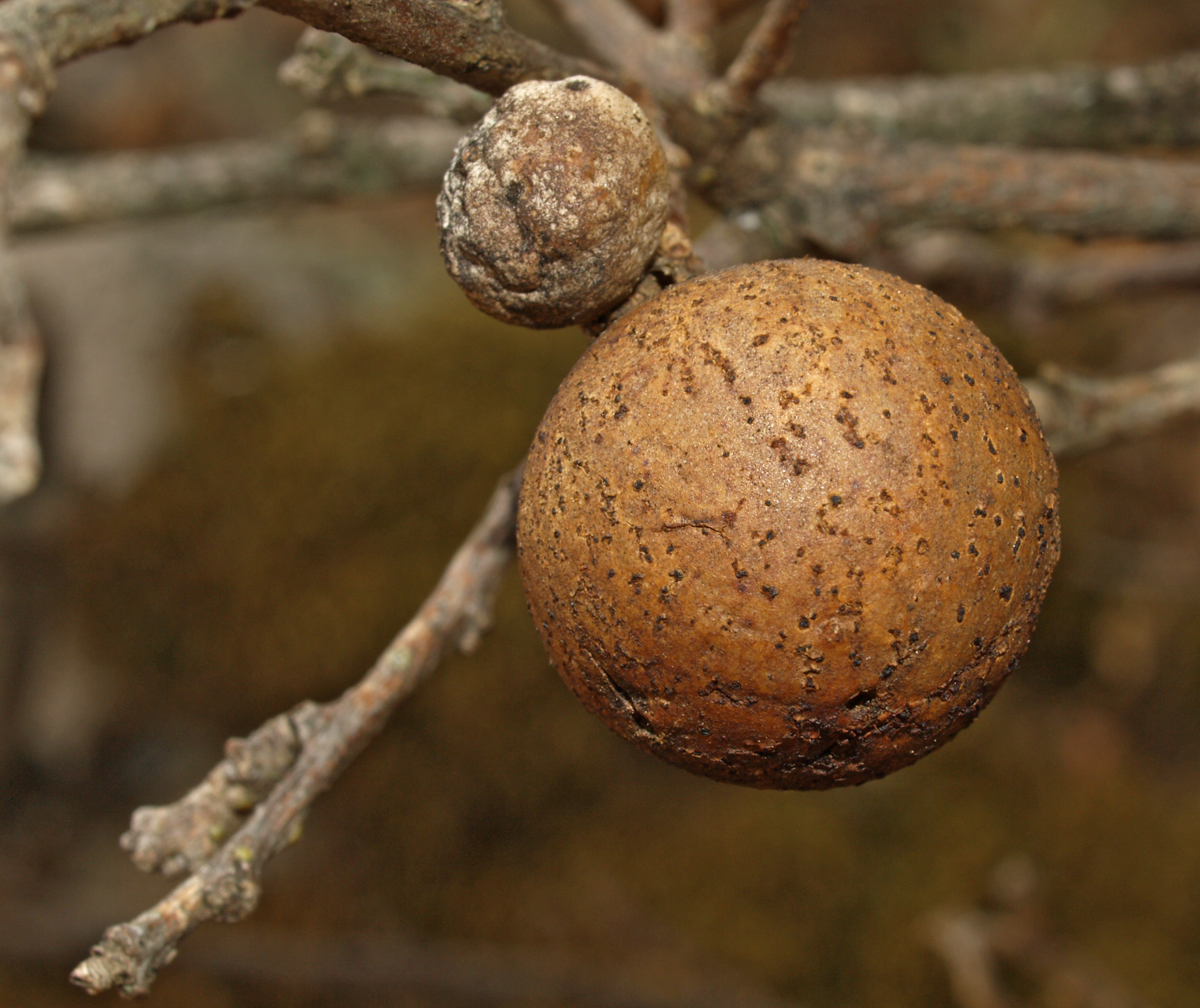

Scientific classification
- Kingdom: Animalia
- Phylum: Arthropoda
- Class: Insecta
- Order: Hymenoptera
- Family: Cynipidae
- Genus: Andricus
- Species: A. hispanicus

Binomial name
- Andricus hispanicus (Hartig, 1856)

Synonyms
- Andricus mayeti Kieffer, 1896; Andricus niger Kieffer 1901, Tavares, 1902 (nec Fourcroy, 1785); Cynips kollari var. minor Kieffer, 1901

= Andricus hispanicus =

Species of insect

Andricus hispanicus is a parthenogenetic species of wasp which causes the formation of marble galls on oak trees. The galls caused by the agamous generation are similar to the closely related Andricus kollari.

== Ecology ==
Andricus hispanicus occurs in Portugal, Spain, southern France and North Africa, where the host of the sexual generation, Quercus suber, occurs. A. hispanicus was previously included in Andricus kollari, but the two are genetically distinct and require different hosts to complete their life cycle.

Both species have alternating sexual and asexual generations. Sexual females lay their eggs in the developing buds of several species of white oaks using their ovipositor. The wasp causes the formation of a round gall, where the larvae develop until they are ready to emerge as asexual females. Through parthenogenesis, these asexual females produce unfertilised eggs that are deposited on the buds of Quercus suber in Andricus hispanicus, or Quercus cerris in Andricus kollari. As these eggs develop, a small, inconspicuous gall forms around on the bud, different from that formed by the previous generation. The unfertilised eggs give rise to a new sexual generation of adult males and females, which mate and restart the cycle.

Experiments have shown that asexual females of Andricus hispanicus will readily oviposit into buds of Quercus suber but show no interest in Quercus cerris, while the reverse is true for Andricus kollari.
