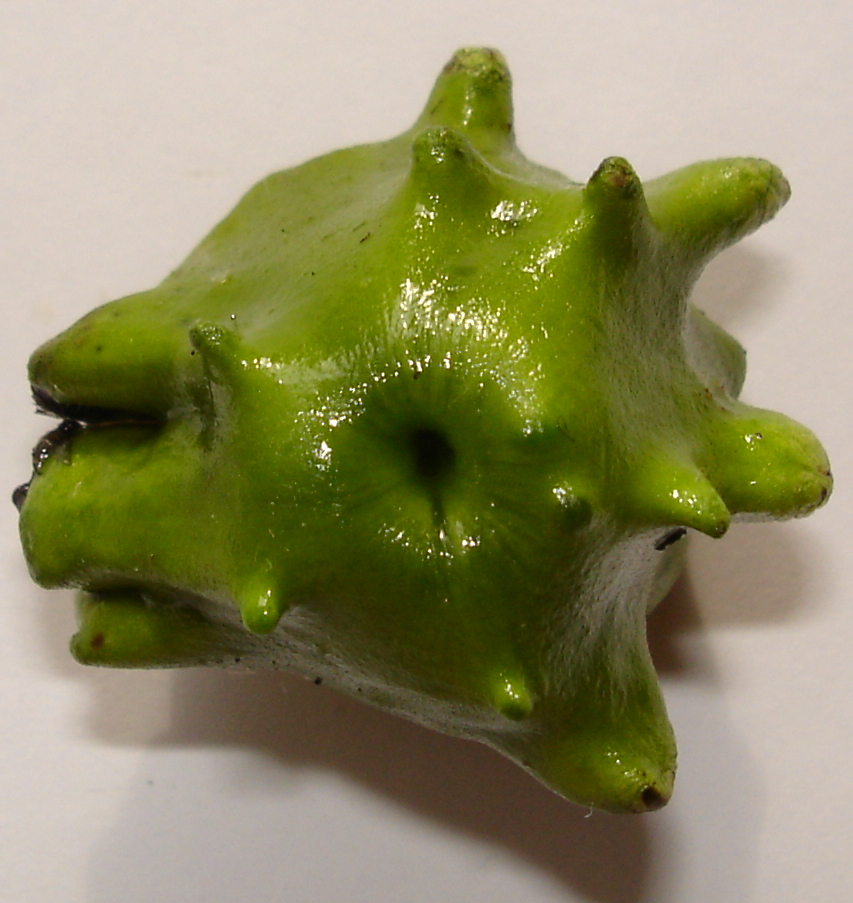
- Mature gall on oak

Scientific classification
- Kingdom: Animalia
- Phylum: Arthropoda
- Clade: Pancrustacea
- Class: Insecta
- Order: Hymenoptera
- Family: Cynipidae
- Genus: Andricus
- Species: A. quercuscalicis

Binomial name
- Andricus quercuscalicis (Burgsdorf, 1783)

= Andricus quercuscalicis =

Species of wasp

Andricus quercuscalicis is a gall wasp species inducing knopper galls.

Knopper galls develop as a chemically induced distortion of growing acorns on pedunculate oak (Quercus robur L.) trees, caused by gall wasps, which lay eggs in buds with their ovipositor. The gall thus produced can greatly reduce the fecundity of the oak host, making this gall potentially more of a threat to the reproductive ability of the tree than those that develop on leaves, buds, stems, etc.

== The physical appearance of the gall ==
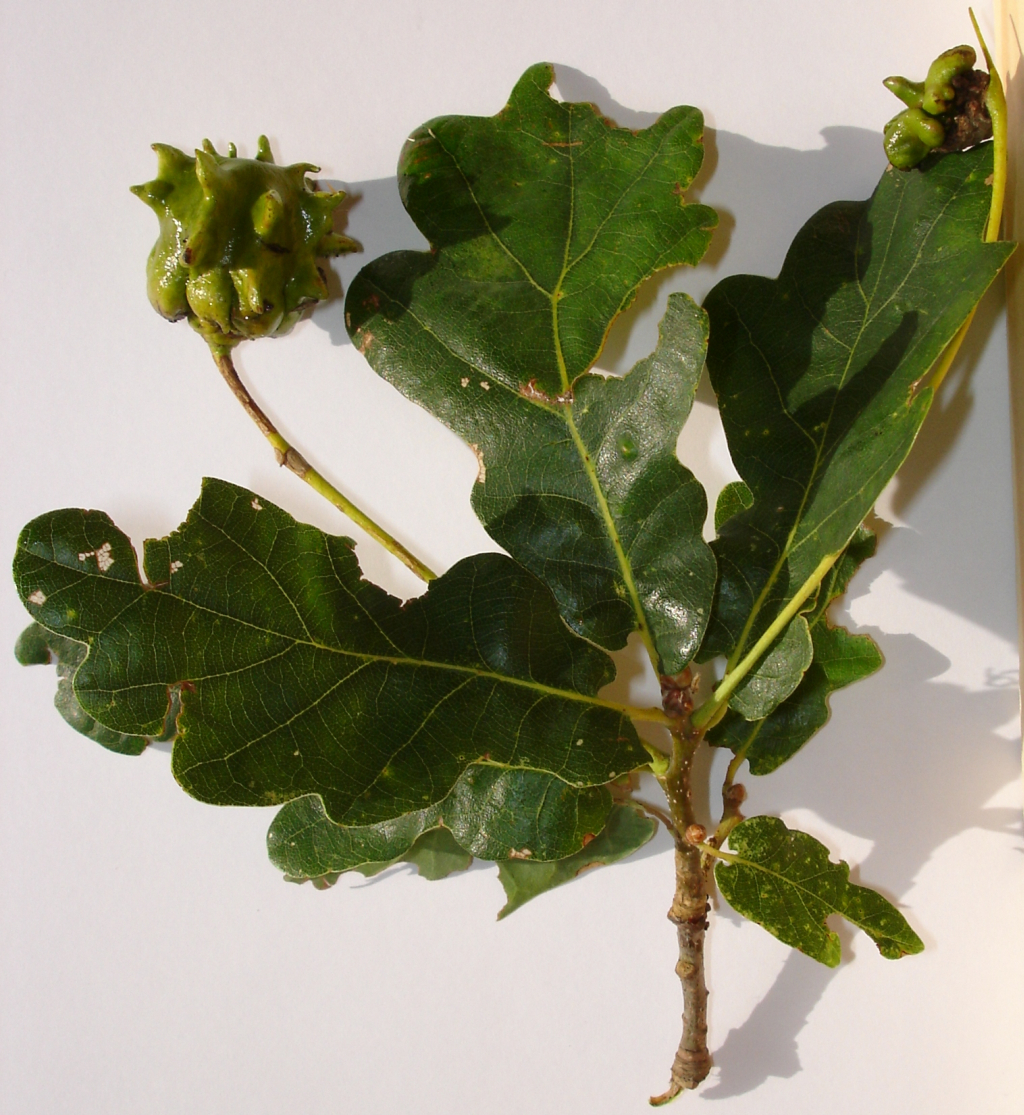
Galls (upper left and right) formed on acorns on the branch of a pedunculate (or English) oak tree by the parthenogenetic generation Andricus quercuscalicis.

The large 2 cm gall growth appears as a mass of green to yellowish-green, ridged, and at first sticky plant tissue on the bud of the oak, that breaks out as the gall between the cup and the acorn. If only a few grubs are developing within, then it may appear only as a group of bland folds. Where several grubs are competing for space the shape may become much more contorted, with several tightly bunched galls.

The word knopper derives from the German word 'Knoppe', meaning a kind of felt cap or helmet worn during the 17th century; also a small rounded protuberance, often decorative, such as a stud, a tassel or a knob.

Although normally distinctive the knopper gall can, under some growth conditions, be mistaken for the acorn cup gall, caused by the gall wasp Andricus grossulariae.

== Inquilines and parasitoids ==
A number of insect inquilines live harmlessly within the knopper gall and some of these, as well as A. quercuscalicis itself, are parasitised by insects referred to as parasitoids.

== Life-cycle ==
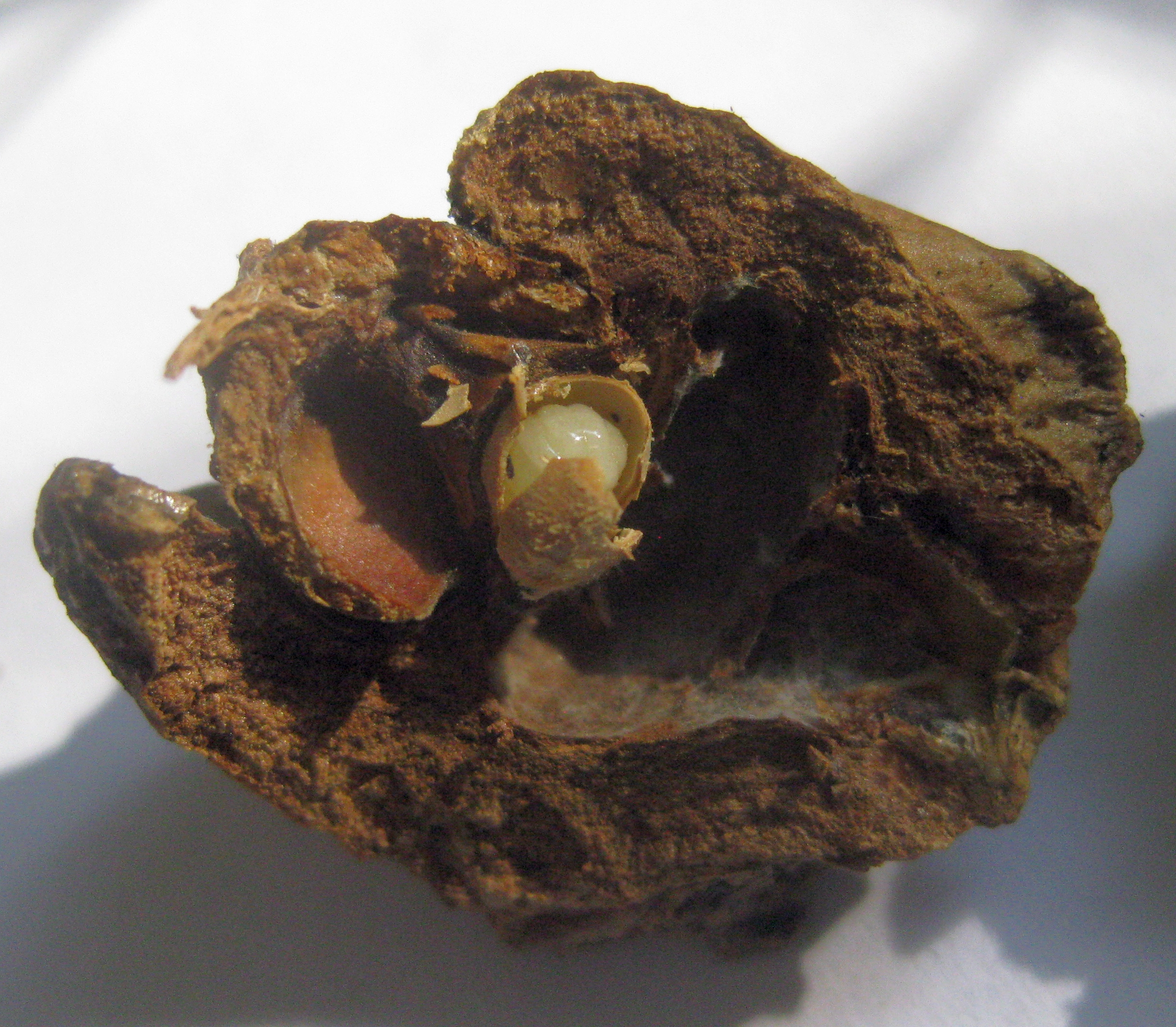
A larva of Andricus quercuscalicis in a gall formed in Quercus robur

Andricus quercuscalicis (Burgsdorf, 1783) (Hymenoptera: Cynipidae) is a small gall wasp with an obligate two-phase life-cycle that requires both pedunculate oak (Q. robur L.) (or occasionally sessile oak Q. petraea L.) and Turkey oak (Quercus cerris L.).

The first phase, occurs in spring in small conical galls that form on the male catkins of the Turkey oak. During this phase, females lay eggs without mating, and those eggs will produce both male and female wasps (parthenogenesis). This bisexual generation mates, and the females lay their eggs in autumn. This second phase, called agamic generation, occurs in autumn. This phase occurs on pedunculate oaks. The galls created during this phase are commonly known as knopper galls.

== Expansion outside of its native range ==
Since A. quercuscalicis depends on Turkey oaks for its reproduction, the wasps were restricted to the range of Turkey oaks (south Eastern Europe). However, since the 17th century, Turkey oak has been planted throughout Europe, allowing for the wasp's range expansion.

The records of the expansion of A. quercuscalicis date as far as 1631, when it was recorded in eastern Germany. Great Britain and Ireland are the most recent territory gains of the species.

=== Britain ===
Woodway House gardens in Devon have both the required host species and indeed Woodway House was one of the first places in Devon to record and send off for research purposes specimens of both life-cycle stages of this invasive species. Long known in western and northern Europe, having spread from southern and eastern Europe over the last 400 years, A. quercuscalicis came from the continent to Devon via the Channel Islands, the first recorded sightings being in Devon in the 1950s. A. quercuscalicis appears to have arrived naturally from the continent, probably crossing the English Channel on high altitude wind currents.

In 1979, A. quercuscalicis underwent a population explosion in England and for a time there was concern that it would seriously affect acorn fertility and thus the future of England's most iconic tree. This has not been the case, and control is regarded as unnecessary. Knopper galls were first noted at Canonbie in southern Scotland in 1995 and their distribution is often restricted to old country and urban estates where the Turkey oak has been previously planted.

The abnormal acorns develop during summer and the acorn is either wholly or partially replaced by the gall growth. The knoppers become woody and brown in early autumn, after which they fall from the tree and the adult sexual female gall wasp emerges through a vent in the top of the gall in spring. The level of attack by the insect varies greatly from year to year.

== See also ==
- Cola-nut gall
- Gall
- Oak apple
- Oak marble gall
- Oak artichoke gall
- Red-pea gall
