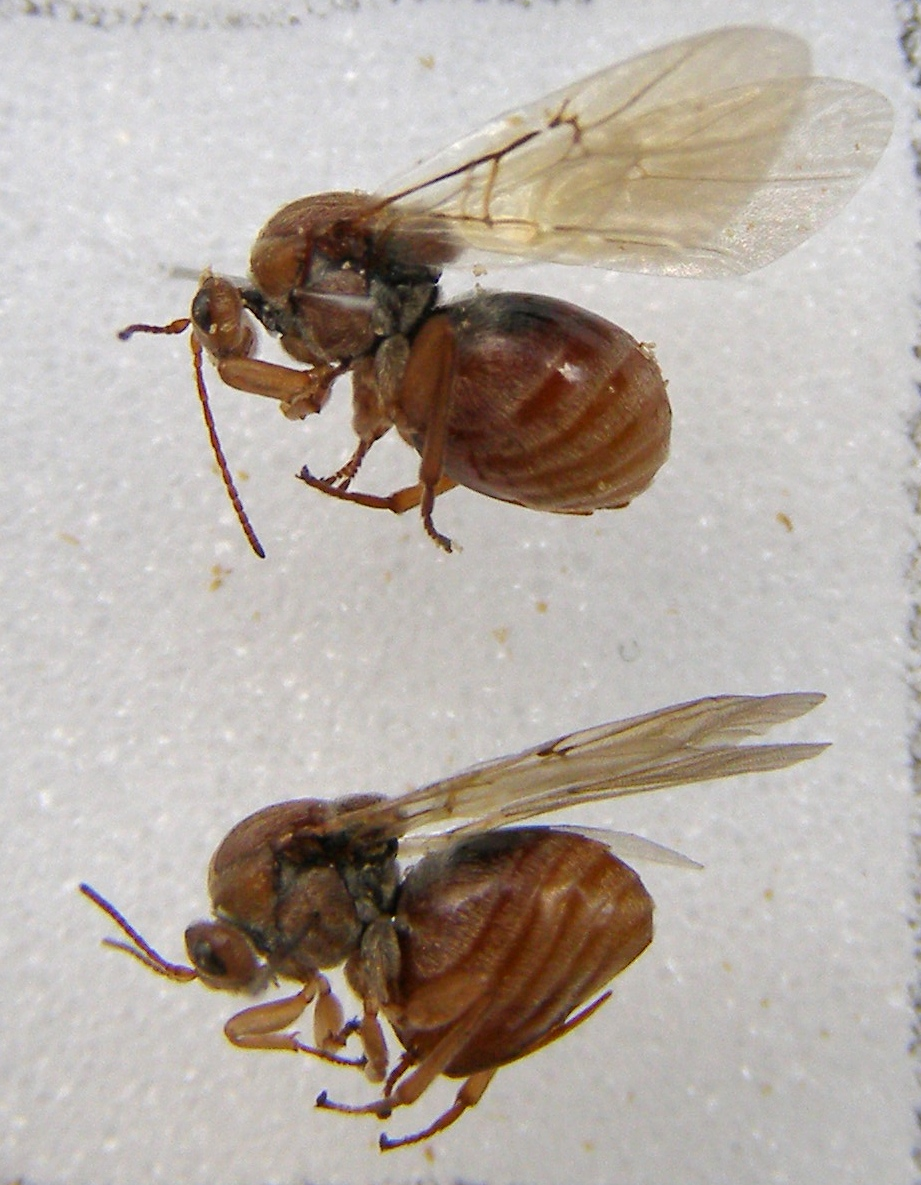
- Female Andricus kollari of the asexual generation

Scientific classification
- Kingdom: Animalia
- Phylum: Arthropoda
- Class: Insecta
- Order: Hymenoptera
- Family: Cynipidae
- Genus: Andricus
- Species: A. kollari

Binomial name
- Andricus kollari (Hartig, 1843)

= Andricus kollari =

Species of insect

Andricus kollari, also known as the marble gall wasp, is a species of wasp which causes the formation of marble galls on oak trees. Synonyms for the species include Cynips kollari, Andricus quercusgemmae, A. minor, A. indigenus and A. circulans.

== Description ==
Adult Andricus kollari are dark brown, and about 1.5–2.0 millimetres (0.059–0.079 in) in length. It has alternating sexual and asexual generations, each often taking two years to complete. Like all gall wasps, it causes the formation of parasitic galls on trees in which it lays its larvae.

In May or June, a sexual female lays her eggs in the developing buds of susceptible oak trees using her ovipositor. Chemicals produced by both the adult and developing wasps cause the formation of a gall. Pedunculate oak (Quercus robur), sessile oak (Q. petraea) and the hybrid Quercus × rosacea can all be parasitized. The host trees are often immature or retarded specimens; galls are rarer on older, healthier trees. The Turkey oak (Q. cerris), introduced into Britain in 1735, is required for the completion of the wasp's life cycle. The oak marble gall is frequently conflated with the oak apple gall, caused by another gall wasp, Biorhiza pallida. Oak marble galls are also known as the bullet gall, oak nut or Devonshire gall.

The developing spherical galls are green at first, brown later, and mature in August. Each gall contains a central chamber, with a single female wasp larva of the asexual generation, which emerges through a 'woodworm-like' hole as an adult winged gall-wasp in September. These asexual (agamic) females lay unfertilized eggs in the embryonic bud leaves of the Turkey oak, with galls slowly developing during winter, and are visible in March and April as small oval structures between the bud scales, looking like ant's eggs or pupae. The emerging adult gall-wasps in spring are the sexual generation, producing both males and females, which fly to the common oaks to initiate the formation of the summer marble gall.

The abnormal buds develop during the summer and the bud is wholly replaced by the growing gall. Marble galls may remain attached to the tree for several years. The level of attack by the insect varies greatly from year to year.

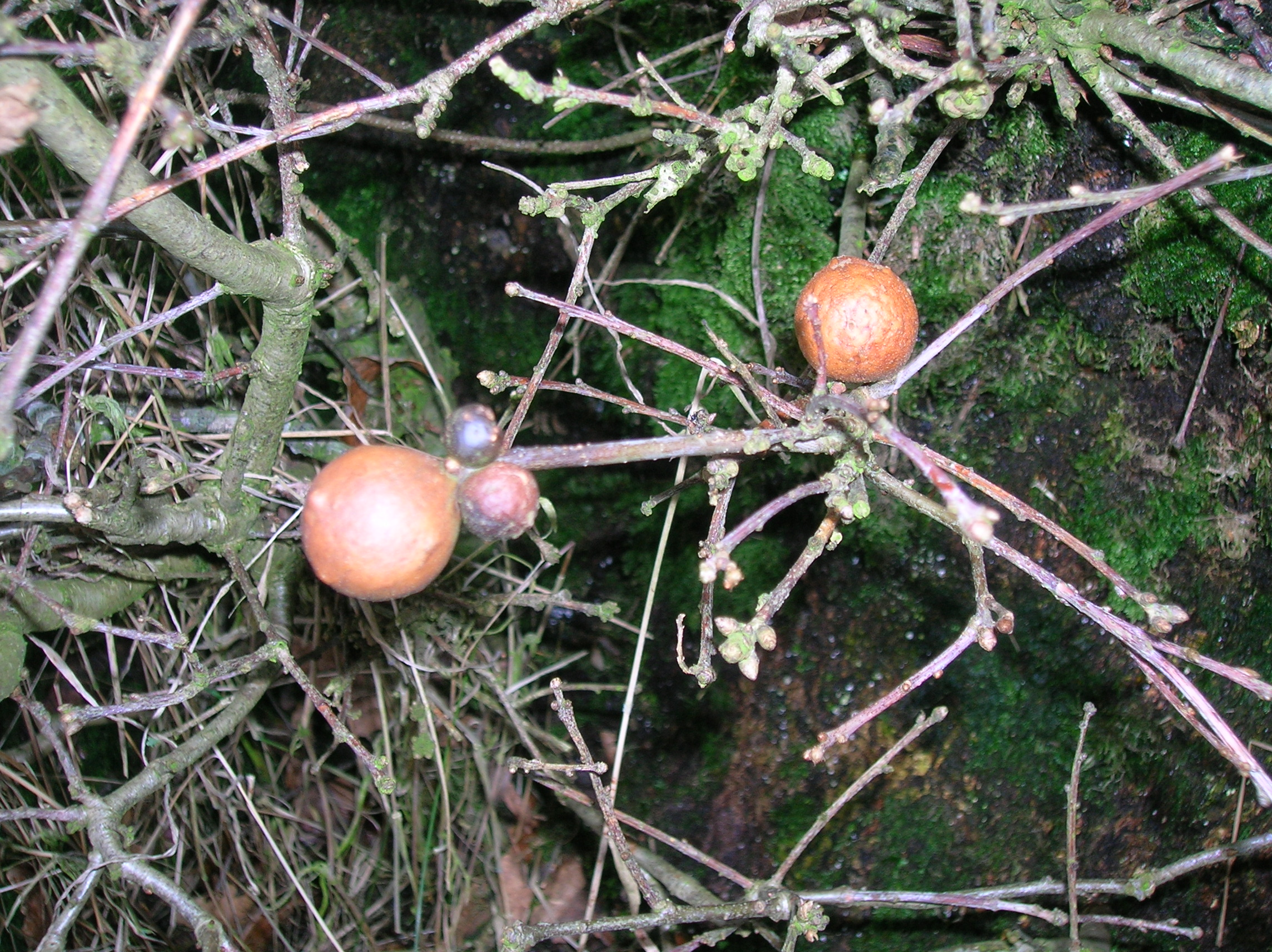
Oak marble galls showing two stunted and two normal-sized examples

A. hispanicus was previously included in A. kollari, but the two are genetically distinct and require different hosts to complete their life cycle, the sexual generation of A. hispanicus developing on the cork oak (Quercus suber) instead of the Turkey oak (Quercus cerris).

== Oak marble gall ==
The gall growth first appears as a rounded mass of green plant tissue on the leaf buds of the oak, later becoming hard and brown, being up to approximately 25 millimetres (0.98 in) in diameter. Although nearly spherical, the galls often have a number of little flattened nodules. The rounded growths are filled with a spongy mass and a single wasp larva is located in a hard, seed-like cell in the centre. The word 'marble' derives from the gall's shape, which is a marble-like rounded structure. As stated, although normally distinctive the oak marble gall can, under some growth conditions, be mistaken for the oak apple gall, caused by a number of gall wasps, such as Biorhiza pallida. This may be due to the observer's unfamiliarity with the true oak apple gall which grows to be somewhat larger, has red markings, but does also grow on the axillary or terminal buds. The galls sometimes coalesce. The non-parasitised specimens are at the largest end of the size range.

Fused and/or stunted specimens can be confused with A. lignicola (Hartig), the "Cola-nut gall".

== Predators, inquilines, parasitoids and fungi ==
Mature galls are sometimes broken open by vertebrate predators to recover the larva or pupa. Woodpeckers, such as the lesser spotted woodpecker, as well as other birds or squirrels have been suggested. In the territory of former Czechoslovakia, both bank voles and yellow-necked mice feed on larvae and pupae extracted from oak marble galls.

A number of insect inquilines live harmlessly within the oak marble gall. Some of these, as well as Andricus itself, are parasitised by insects referred to as parasitoids. The chalcid wasp Torymus nitens is an example of a parasitoid in oak marble galls. The presence of these inquilines and parasites is often visible on older galls by the presence of fine exit-holes, smaller than that of the gall wasp itself.

A gall can contain the cynipid wasp as the host that made the gall; up to five species of inquilines (Ceroptres clavicornis, Synergus gallaepomiformis, S. pallidipennis, S. reinhardi and S. umbraculus) eating the host's food; as well as up to thirteen parasitoid species (Eurytoma brunniventris, Sycophila biguttata, S. variegata, Megastigmus dorsalis, M. stigmatizans, Torymus geranii, T. auratus, Caenacis lauta, Hobbya stenonota, Mesopolobus amaenus, M. fasciiventris, M. sericeus, Eupelmus urozonus) living on the host, inquilines and each other.

Many old galls bear numerous dark brown excrescences, due to the fungus Phoma gallorum.

== Uses of oak marble galls ==
The galls contain large amounts of tannic acid, which was used for making iron gall ink and for dyeing cloth. According to recent research, traces of iron-gall ink have been found on the Dead Sea Scrolls and on the 'lost' Gospel of Judas. Iron-gall ink may have been used for 1,800 years, but it does not withstand the test of time well. Over the course of centuries, the ink fades, and discolours and damages the paper. Other waterproof formulae, better suited for writing on paper, became available in the 20th century. Iron gall ink is manufactured chiefly by artists enthusiastic about reviving old methods or possibly forgers of old documents.

British galls have too little tannic acid (about 17%) for the best results; Aleppo galls have three times as much.

Powdered galls mixed with hog's lard and applied to the posterior were said to be good for curing piles.

Oak marble gall extract is used in deodorants because of tannic acid's anti-bacterial properties.

== Infestations of oak marble galls ==
Removing and destroying galls before they dry and the wasps emerge from a hole may help to reduce the infestation. While fairly large, spectacular, and sometimes present in quite large numbers, they cause no measurable harm. The galls were the subject of considerable press controversy in the mid-nineteenth century when it was thought that the acorn crop would be ruined and its rapid spread would deprive farmers of valuable pannage (fodder) for their pigs.

== Gallery ==
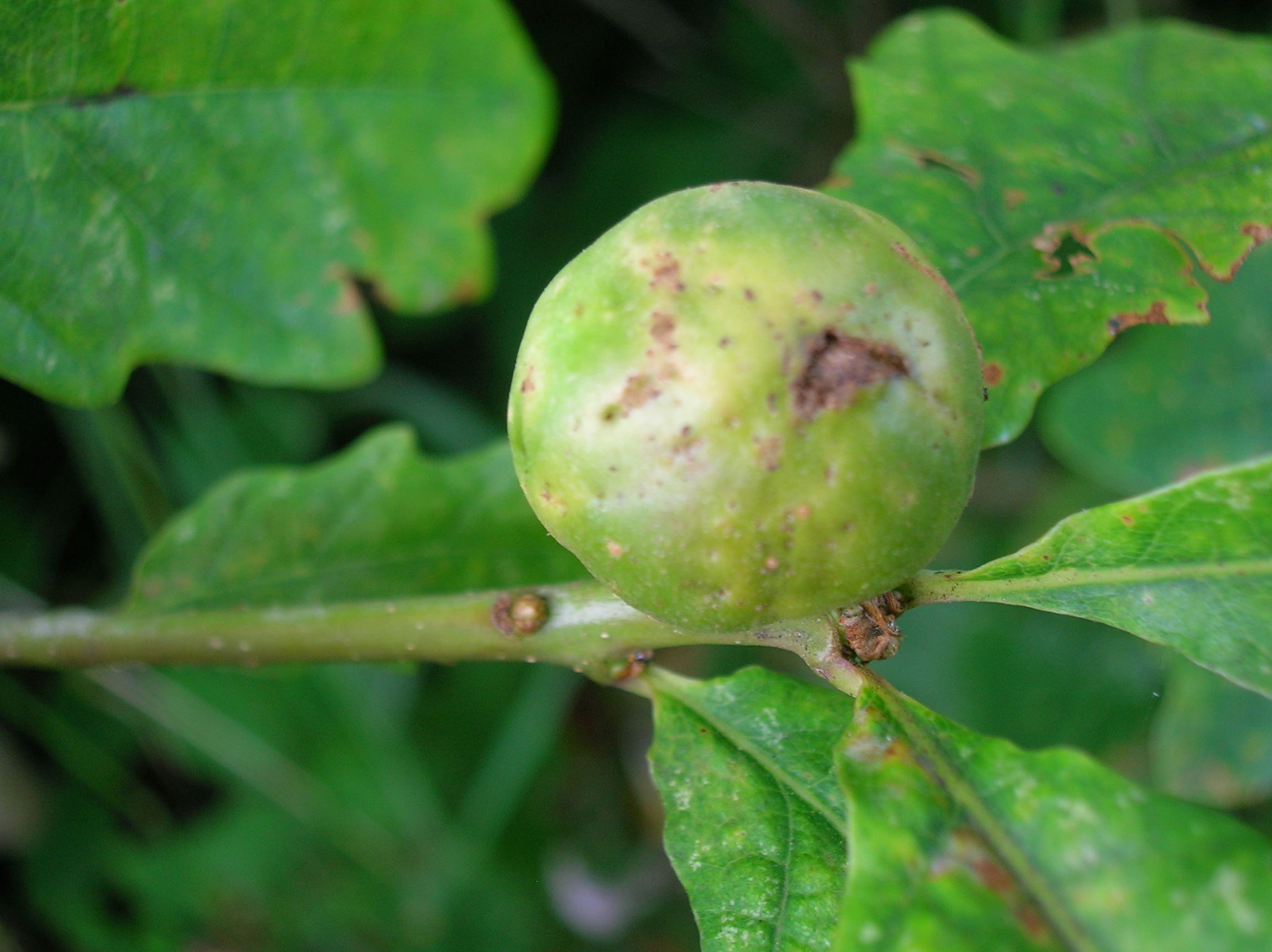
A developing oak marble gall

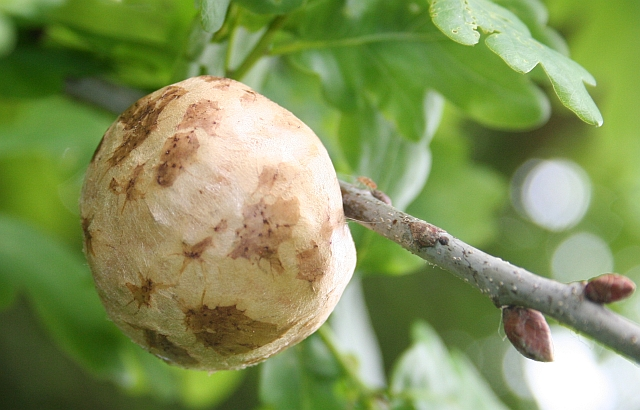
An oak apple gall; often confused with the oak marble gall: the brown areas are scale remnants from the bud.

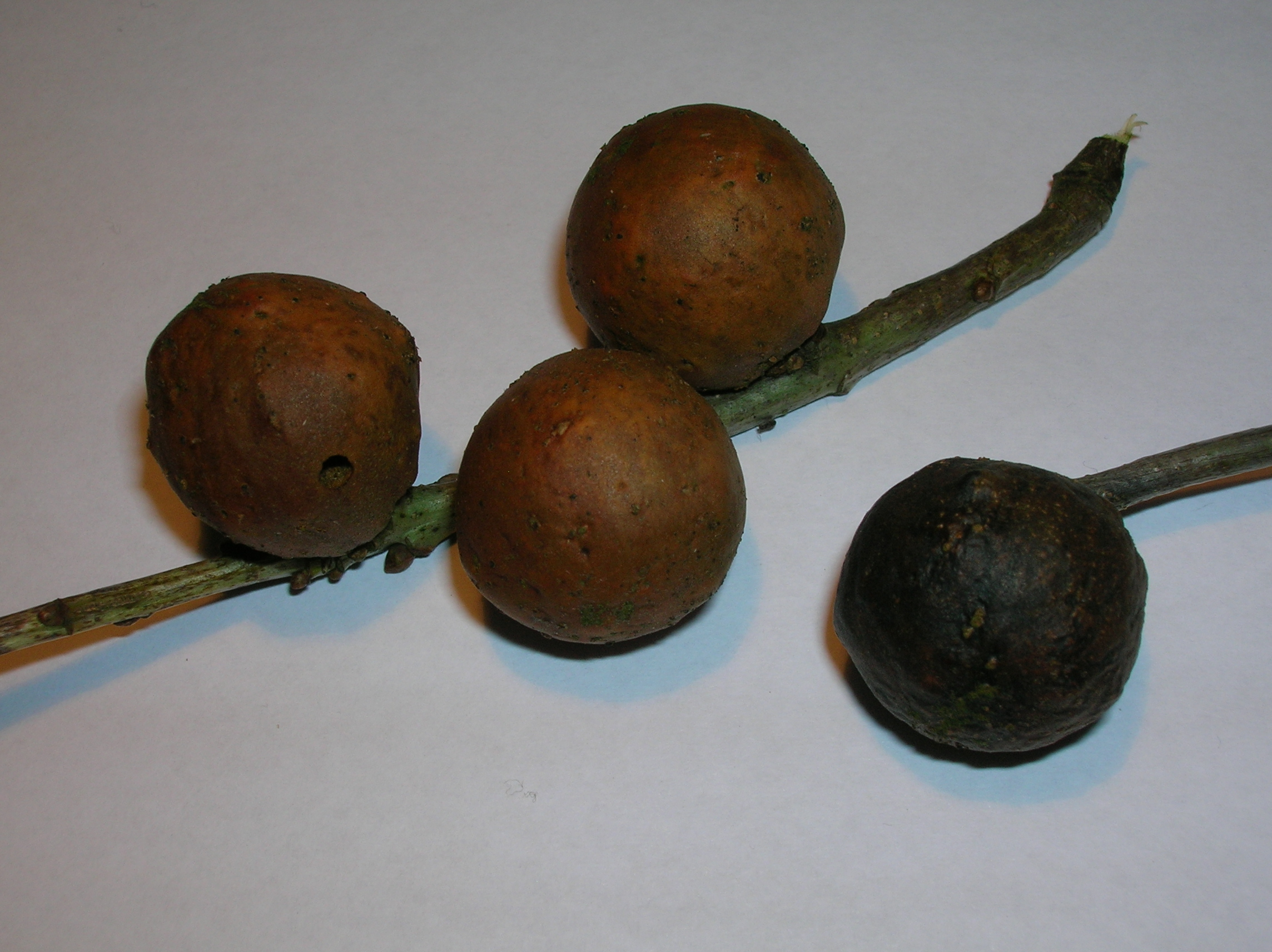
Oak marble galls, one with a gall fly exit hole and another with Phoma gallorum fungal attack

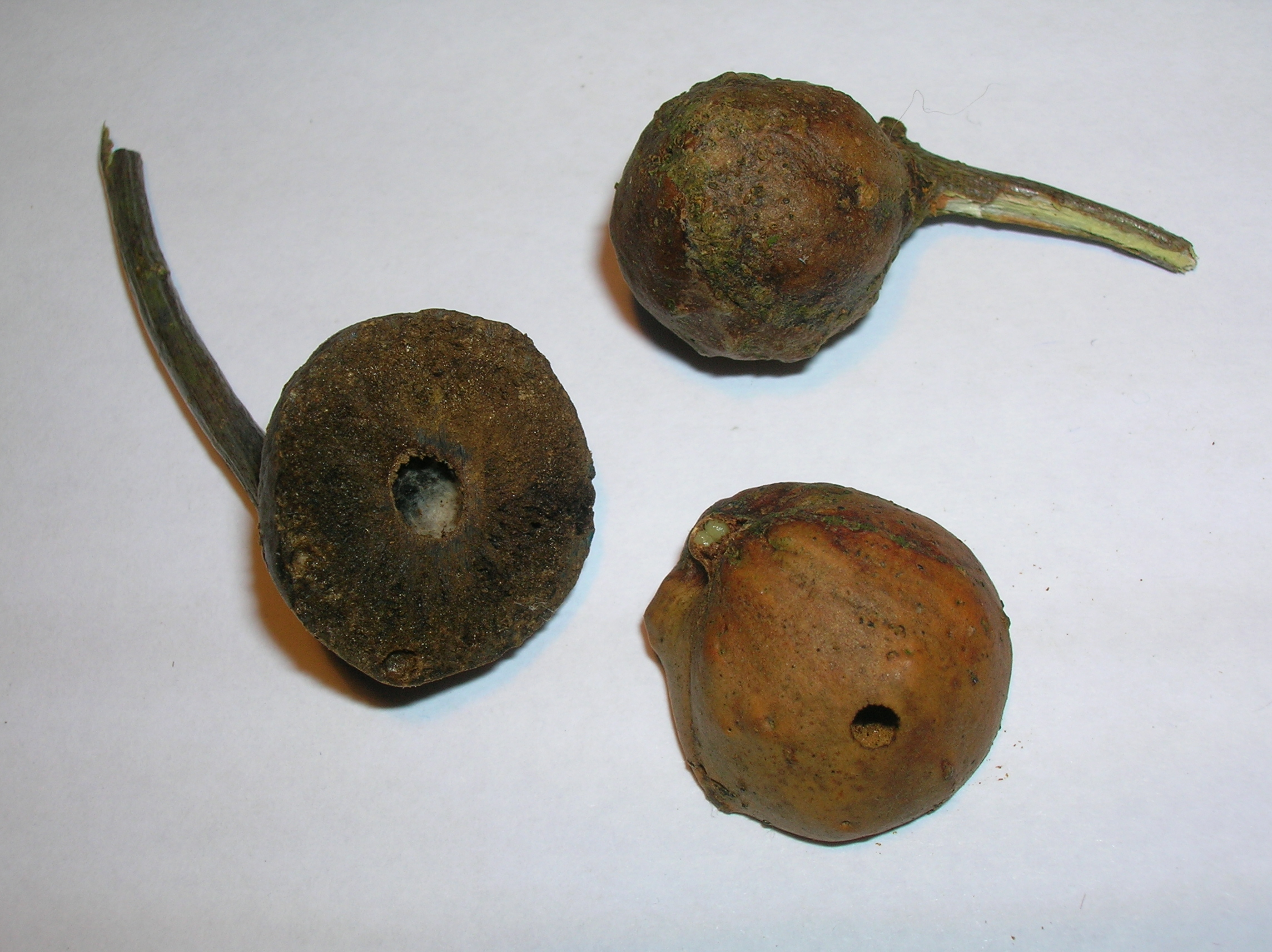
Sectioned gall showing central 'cell' and inquiline chamber; exit-hole and a possibly parasitised stunted gall specimen

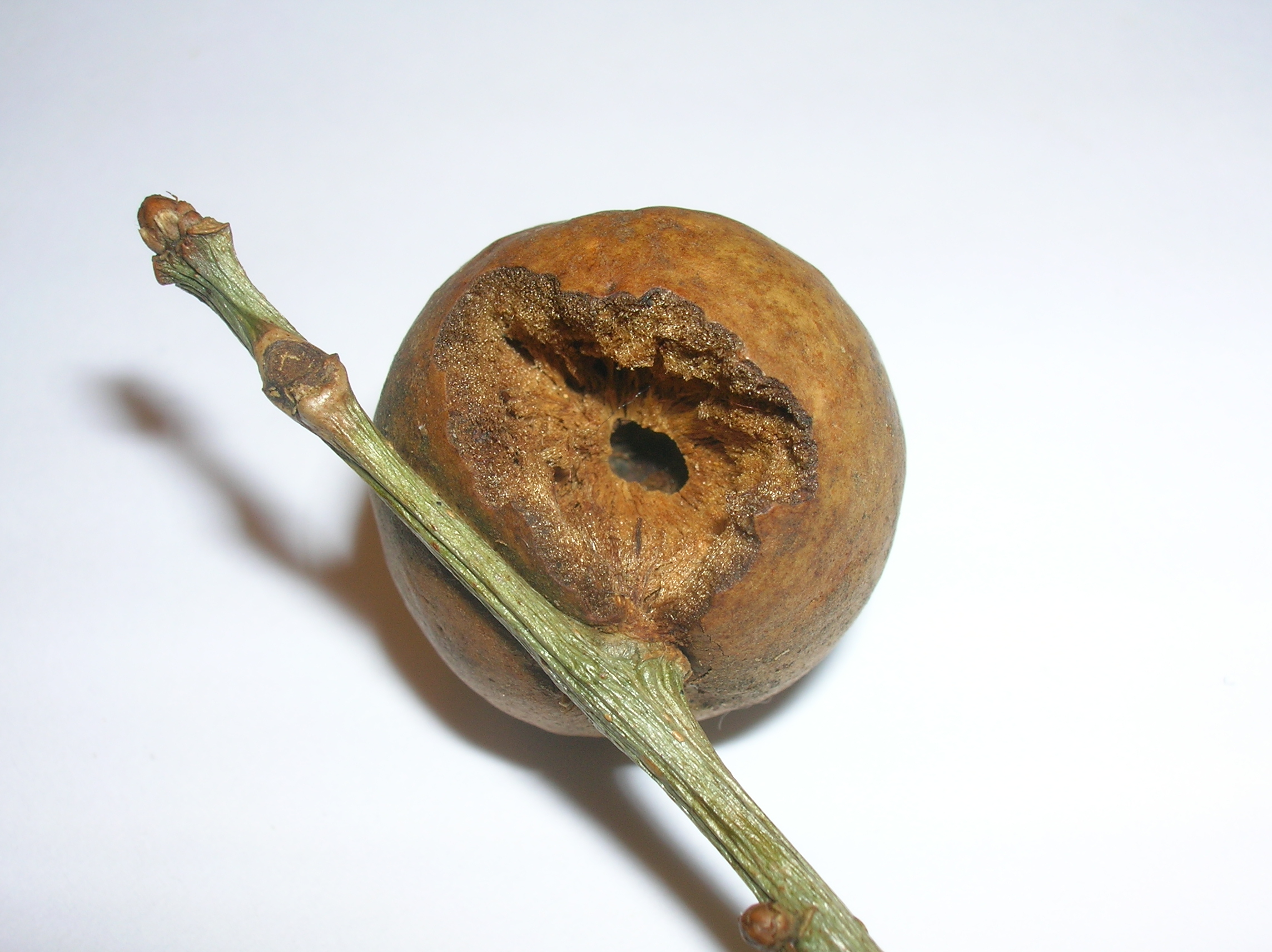
Oak marble gall depredated by a bird

== See also ==
- Andricus grossulariae
- Cola-nut gall
- Knopper gall
- Oak artichoke gall
- Rose bedeguar gall
