= Arthur Osborne =

Arthur Osborne may refer to:

- Arthur Osborne (politician), New Zealand politician
- Arthur Osborne (writer), English writer on mysticism

== See also ==
- Arthur Osborn, executed for the murder of Fred N. Selak, the Hermit of Grand Lake, Colorado
