= Arthur Osborn (botanist) =

English botanist (1878–1964)

Arthur Osborn MBE (16 December 1878 – 24 February 1964) was an English gardener, botanist and arborist.

Arthur's Osborn's father, Brewer Osborn, gained a considerable reputation as a horticulturalist and was a gardener at Holme Park, Sonning from 1870 to 1898. In 1899 Arthur Osborn became a gardener at the Royal Botanic Gardens, Kew. At the Kew Arboretum he was appointed an assistant curator and was eventually promoted to deputy curator. He was in charge of the Kew Arboretum during the 1930s. His 1933 book Shrubs and Trees for the Garden showed his "extensive practical experience in arboriculture".

== Selected publications ==
- Osborn, Arthur (1914). "Transplanting Large Trees and Shrubs". The Garden. 78: 68–69.
- Coutts, John; Edwards, Alexander; Osborn, A. (1930). The Complete Book of Gardening. London: Ward, Lock & Co.
- Osborn, A. (1933). Shrubs and Trees for the Garden. London: Ward, Lock & Co.
- Osborn, A. (1938). "Magnolias in the Landscape and Garden". Landscape and Garden: 53–54.
- Osborn, Arthur; Bagenal, N. B. (1952). Pruning: A Practical Handbook on the Pruning of Ornamental and Flowering Trees and Shrubs, Rose Trees and Fruit Trees. London: Ward, Lock & Co.
