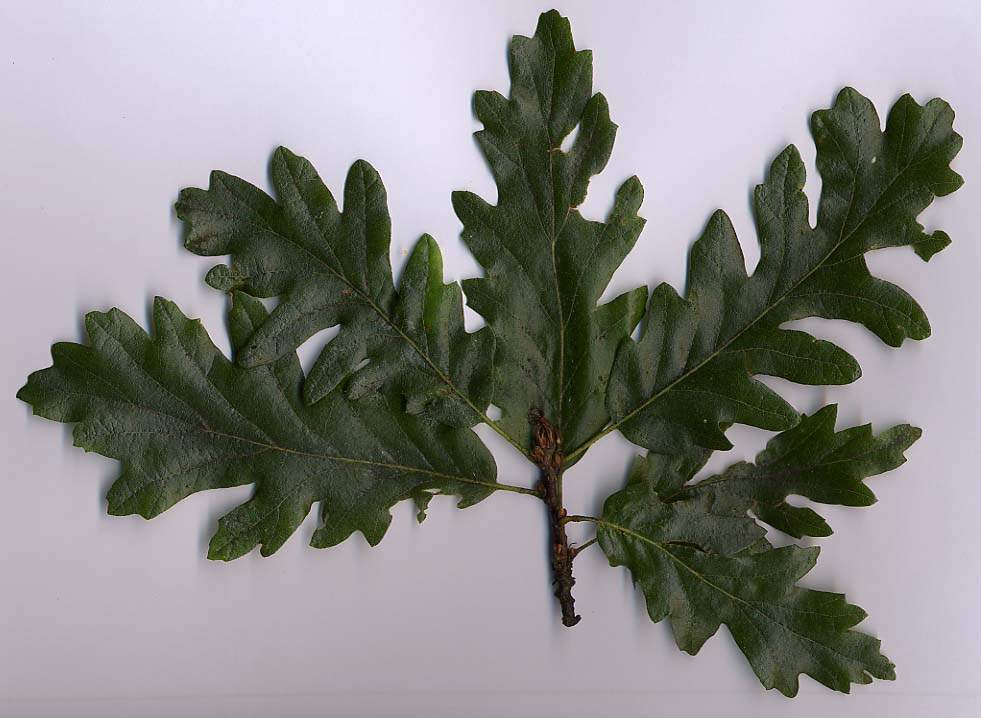
- Turkey oak foliage

Conservation status
- Least Concern (IUCN 3.1)

Scientific classification
- Kingdom: Plantae
- Clade: Tracheophytes
- Clade: Angiosperms
- Clade: Eudicots
- Clade: Rosids
- Order: Fagales
- Family: Fagaceae
- Genus: Quercus
- Subgenus: Quercus subg. Cerris
- Section: Quercus sect. Cerris
- Species: Q. cerris

Binomial name
- Quercus cerris L.
- Distribution map

Synonyms
- List: Cerris australis Raf.; Cerris austriaca (Willd.) Raf.; Cerris crinita (Lam.) Raf.; Cerris paliphleos Raf.; Quercus aegilops Scop.; Quercus ambrozyana Simonk.; Quercus asplenifolia A.DC.; Quercus austriaca Willd.; Quercus cana Steud.; Quercus cerris subf. acutiloba Mátyás; Quercus cerris subf. acutilobata Mátyás; Quercus cerris subf. acutobipinnata Mátyás; Quercus cerris subf. acutodentata Mátyás; Quercus cerris subf. acutolaciniata Mátyás; Quercus cerris subf. acutomucronata Mátyás; Quercus cerris f. balatae Boros ex Mátyás; Quercus cerris f. basi-cuneata Mátyás; Quercus cerris subf. basicordata Mátyás; Quercus cerris subf. dentatolaciniata Mátyás; Quercus cerris f. laciniatolyrata Mátyás; Quercus cerris f. leviterlobata Mátyás; Quercus cerris subf. lobatolaciniata Mátyás; Quercus cerris subf. mucronata Mátyás; Quercus cerris subf. mucronatobipinnata Mátyás; Quercus cerris subf. mucronatopinnata Mátyás; Quercus cerris subf. pinnatilobata Mátyás; Quercus cerris f. roborilobata Mátyás; Quercus cerris subf. rotundatolaciniata Mátyás; Quercus cerris subf. rotundatolobata Mátyás; Quercus cerris subf. rotundilobata Mátyás; Quercus cerris f. sinuatolobata Mátyás; Quercus cerris subf. sublobata Mátyás; Quercus cerris subf. submucronata Mátyás; Quercus cerris f. verae-csapodyae Mátyás; Quercus crinita Lam.; Quercus crispa Steud.; Quercus echinata Salisb.; Quercus frondosa Steud.; Quercus haliphlaeos Lam.; Quercus heterophylla A.DC.; Quercus lanuginosa Lam.; Quercus nicotrae Lojac.; Quercus pseudocerris Boiss.; Quercus ragnal Lodd. ex Loudon; Quercus raynal K.Koch; Quercus secondatii Steud.; Quercus thracica Stef. & Nedjalkov; Quercus tournefortii Willd.; Quercus tukhtensis Czeczott; Quercus variegata Lodd. ex Steud.

= Quercus cerris =

Turkey oak

Species of plant

Quercus cerris, the Turkey oak or Austrian oak, is a species of oak in the beech family (Fagaceae). It is native to southern and south-eastern Europe, Asia Minor, and the Levant, but has been introduced outside its range. It is the type species of Quercus sect. Cerris, a section of the genus characterised by shoot buds surrounded by soft bristles, bristle-tipped leaf lobes, and acorns that usually mature in 18 months.

== Taxonomy and evolution ==
Turkey oak was formally described by Carl Linnaeus in his 1753 Species Plantarum. The species epiphet — cerris — derives from the Latin name for the species, cerrus, which in turn may have come from a root meaning 'hard', or from a Berber term for oak.

Within the genus Quercus, Quercus cerris is classified in section Cerris of the subgenus Cerris, which is distributed in Eurasia, with a centre of diversity in the eastern Mediterranean. Within sect. Cerris, Turkey oak is in turn classified in the subsection Cerris, alongside Q. castaneifolia and Q. look, which are endemic to the Hyrcanian forests and the Levant, respectively.

After the last glacial, Turkey oak was restricted to areas south of the Alps, however, fossil galls preserved at the site of Raalte, the Netherlands, described in 2008, yielded indirect evidence that Turkey oak was present in northwestern Europe during the Eemian interglacial (130-115 thousand years ago), which preceded the last glacial.

At the site, two types of oak galls were discovered, one of which was clearly attributable to the asexual generation of the gall wasp Andricus hungaricus, whereas the other type was more tentatively identified as belonging to the asexual generation of Andricus quercusradicis. Significantly, both Andricus species have lifecycles involving an asexual generation and a sexual generation, with each generation usually developing on a different host plant. With Andricus hungaricus in particular, the asexual generation is strictly restricted to white oaks (Quercus subg. Quercus sect. Quercus), Quercus robur in particular, while the sexual generation develops exclusively on cork oaks (Quercus subg. Cerris sect. Cerris), and especially on Turkey oak.

Importantly, these gall wasps therefore require the presence of oaks from both sections to complete their lifecycle, as evidenced by the invasion of several host-switching Andricus species (A. corruptrix, A. lignicola, A. kollari, A. quercusscalicis) into northwestern Europe in response to the naturalisation of Turkey oak in that area. Thus, although direct fossil evidence of Turkey oak during the Eemian of northwestern Europe is lacking, the galls preserved at Raalte imply its presence.

== Description ==
Quercus cerris is a large deciduous tree growing to 25–40 metres (82–131 feet) tall with a trunk up to 2 m (6 1/2 ft) in diameter. The bark is dark gray and deeply furrowed. On mature trees, the bark fissures are often streaked orange near the base of the trunk. The glossy leaves are 7–14 centimetres (2 3/4–5 1/2 inches) long and 3–5 cm wide, with 6–12 triangular lobes on each side; the regularity of the lobing varies greatly, with some trees having very regular lobes, others much less regular.

The flowers are wind-pollinated catkins, maturing about 18 months after pollination; the fruit is a large acorn, 2.5–4 cm (1–1 1/2 in) long and 2 cm broad, bicoloured with an orange basal half grading to a green-brown tip; the acorn cup is 2 cm deep, densely covered in soft 'mossy' bristles from 4–8 millimetres (1/8–3/8 in) in length.

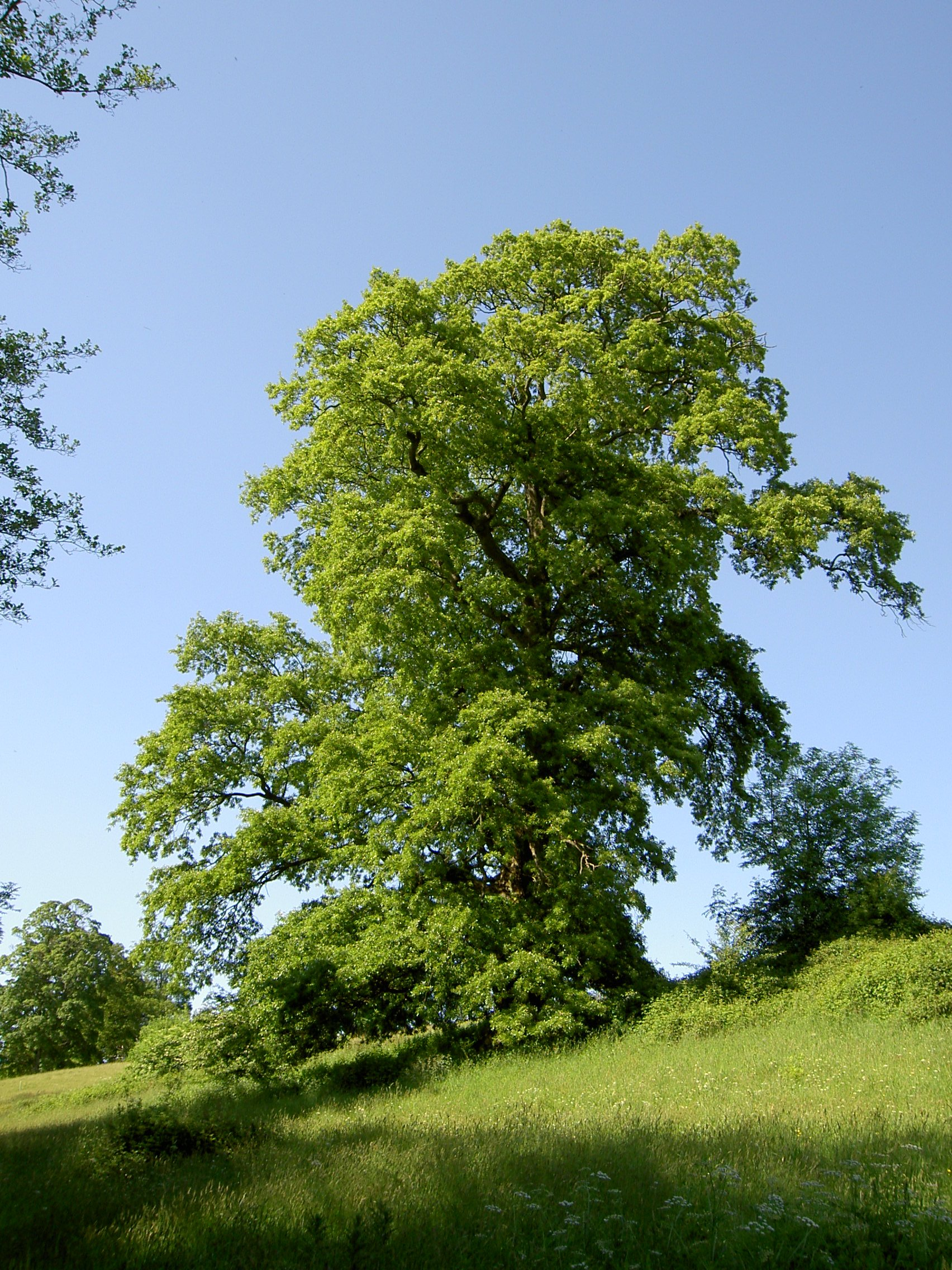
Mature Turkey oak at Hillersdon House, England

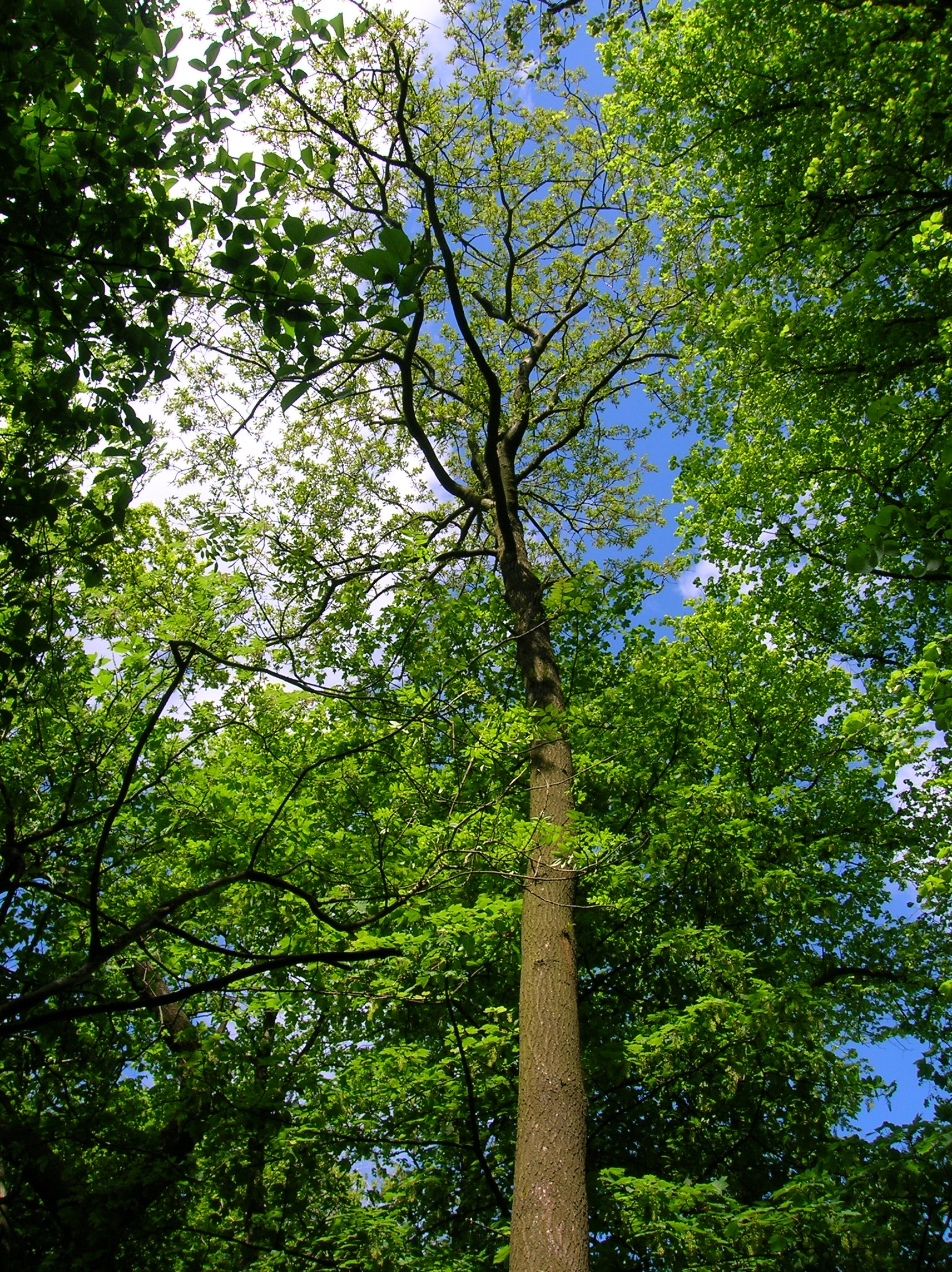
A Turkey oak coming into leaf

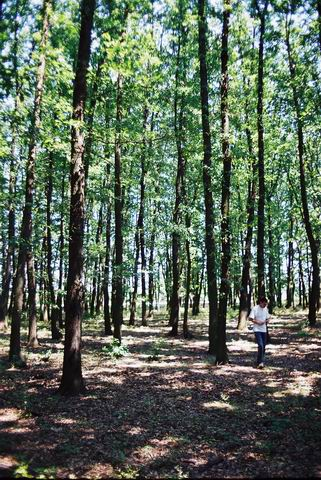
Hungarian oak-Turkey oak (Quercetum frainetto-cerris Rud) forest in the Balkans

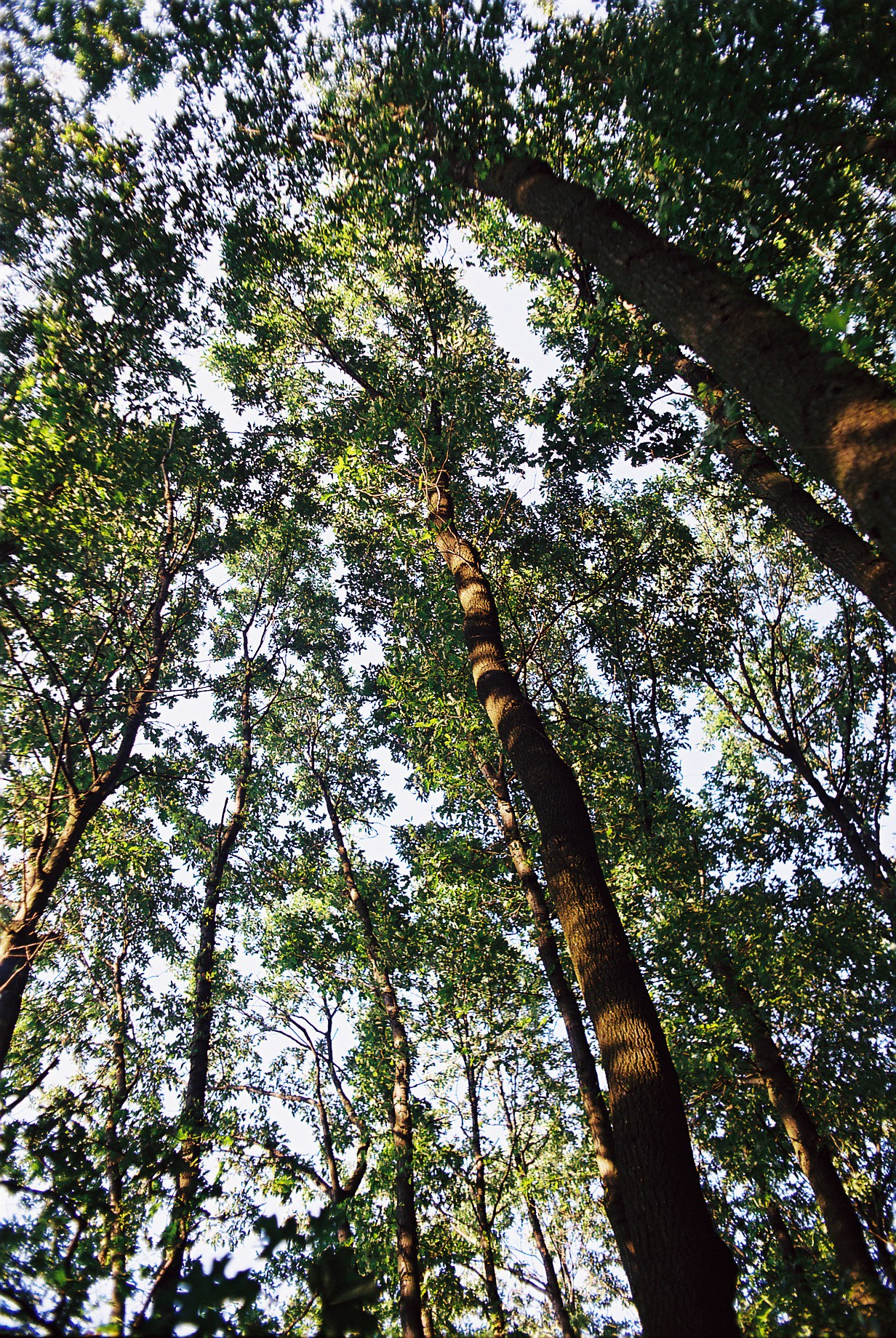
Turkey oak grove, Lončanik village, Central Serbia

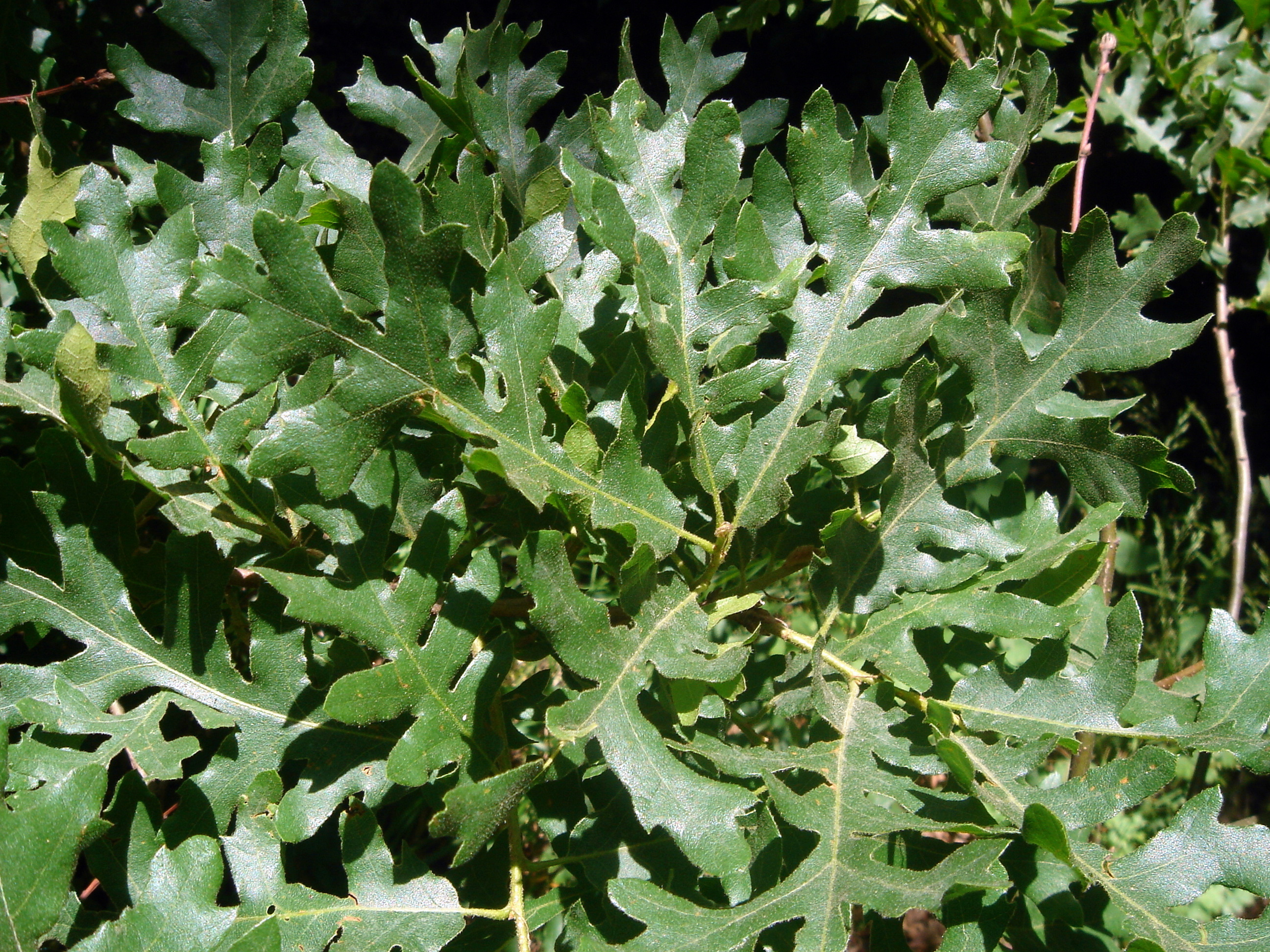
Foliage

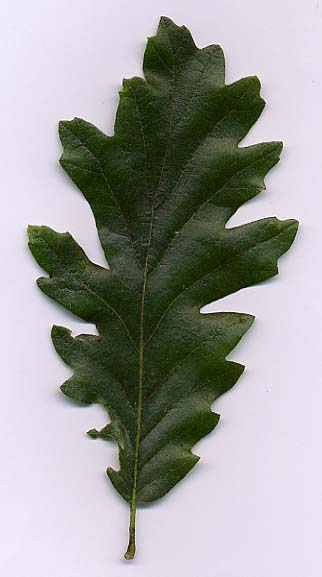
Turkey oak leaf showing variation in lobing

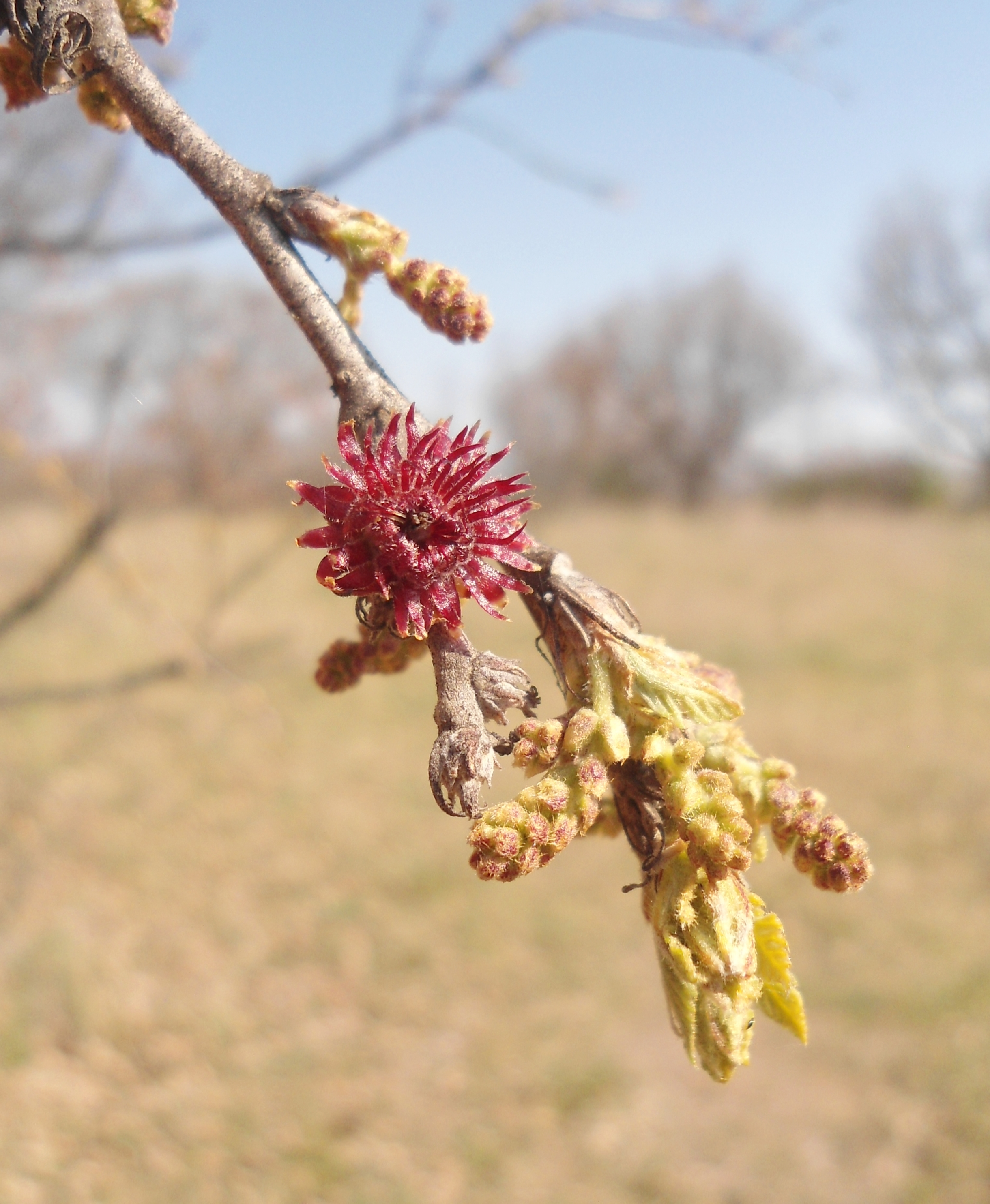
Turkey oak flower

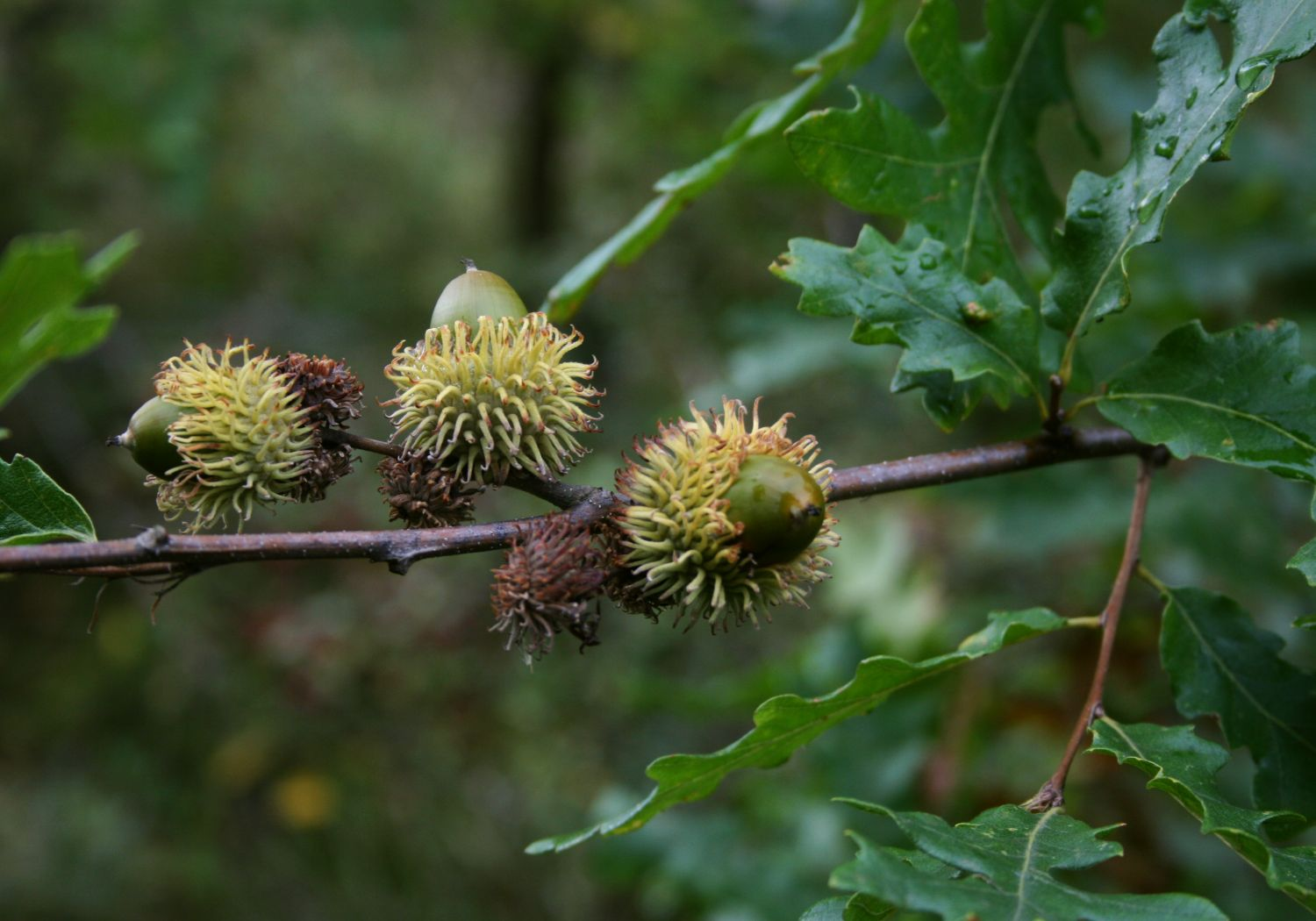
Acorns with 'hairy' cups

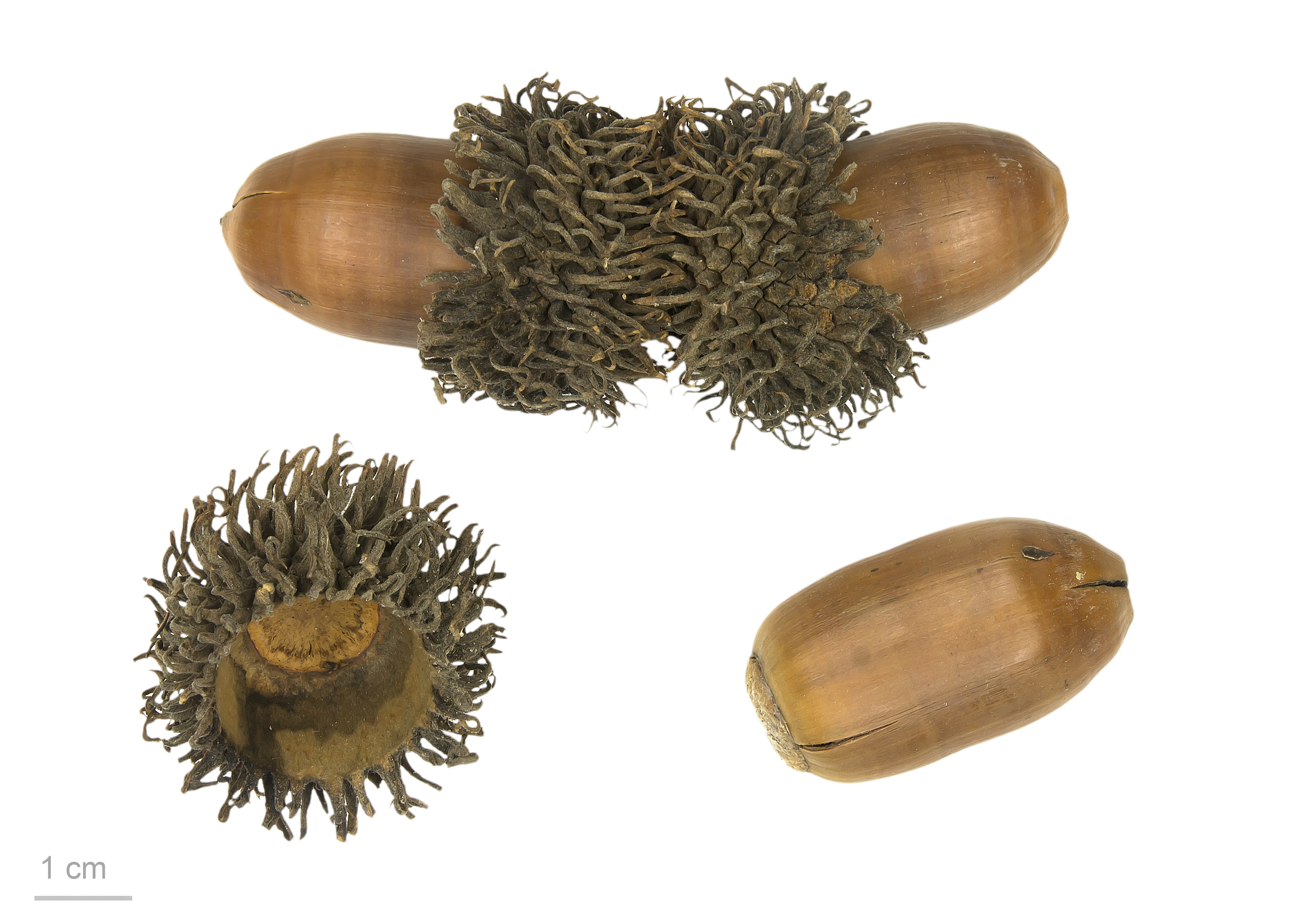
Turkey oak dried fruits and seeds

== Distribution and ecology ==
First year acorns are very bitter, but are eaten by jays and pigeons; squirrels usually only eat them when other food sources have run out.

The species' range extended to northern Europe and the British Isles before the previous ice age, about 120,000 years ago. It was reintroduced in the UK and Ireland in the eighteenth century as an ornamental tree, its gall wasps now provide early food for birds. The tree harbours the gall wasp Andricus quercuscalicis whose larvae seriously damage the acorns of native British oaks. In 1998, the Ministry of Defence ordered the felling of all Turkey oaks on its United Kingdom bases.

== Cultivation ==
Turkey oak is widely planted and is naturalised in much of Europe. This is partly for its relatively fast growth. It is used as an ornamental, and as a coastal windbreak. Several cultivars have been selected, including 'Variegata', a variegated cultivar, and 'Woden', with large, deeply lobed leaves.

Turkey oak readily hybridises with cork oak (Q. suber), the resulting hybrid being named Q. × crenata Lam. This hybrid occurs both naturally where its parents' ranges overlap in the wild, and has also arisen in cultivation. It is a very variable medium to large tree, usually semi-evergreen, sometimes nearly completely so, and often with marked hybrid vigour; its bark is thick and fissured but never as thick as that of the cork oak. Numerous cultivars are available, often grafted onto Turkey oak root stock. These include 'Ambrozyana', evergreen except in severe winters, originating from the Arboretum in Slovakia, home of the late Count Ambrozy; 'Diversifolia', with the leaves extremely deeply cut leaving a narrow strip down the centre, and very corky bark; 'Fulhamensis' (Fulham oak), raised at Osborne's nursery in Fulham c.1760; and 'Lucombeana' (Lucombe oak), raised by William Lucombe at his nursery in Exeter c. 1762. An early specimen raised by Lucombe is at the Royal Botanic Gardens, Kew. A similar Lucombe oak was felled by fungus and a light wind in Phear Park, Exmouth 15 February 2009.

== Cultivation and uses ==
The wood has many of the characteristics of other oaks, but is very prone to crack and split and hence is relegated to such uses as fencing.

== See also ==
- Knopper gall
- Oak marble gall
