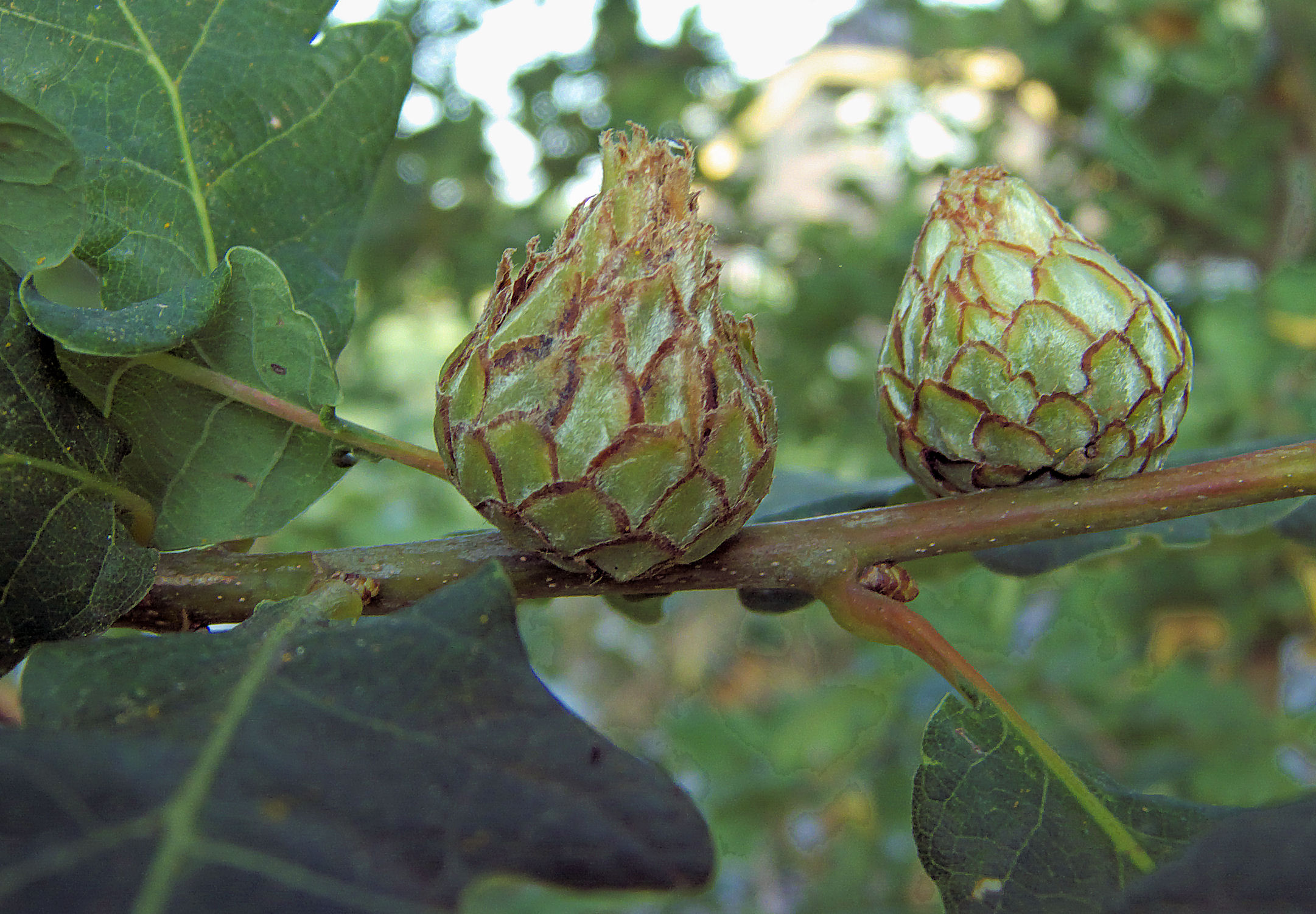
- Mature galls on pedunculate oak
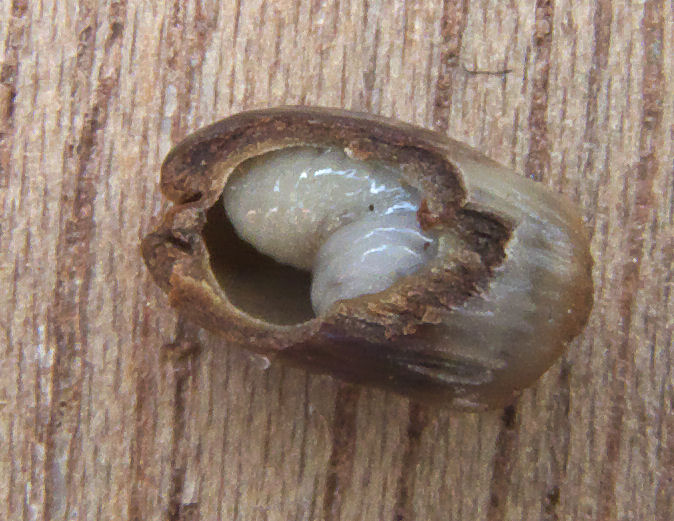
- Larva

Scientific classification
- Kingdom: Animalia
- Phylum: Arthropoda
- Class: Insecta
- Order: Hymenoptera
- Family: Cynipidae
- Genus: Andricus
- Species: A. foecundatrix

Binomial name
- Andricus foecundatrix (Hartig, 1840)

= Andricus foecundatrix =

Species of wasp

Andricus foecundatrix (formerly Andricus fecundator) is a parthenogenetic gall wasp which lays a single egg within a leaf bud, using its ovipositor, to produce a gall known as an oak artichoke gall, oak hop gall, larch-cone gall or hop strobile. The gall develops as a chemically induced distortion of leaf axillary or terminal buds on pedunculate oak (Quercus robur) or sessile oak (Quercus petraea) trees. The larva lives inside a smaller hard casing inside the artichoke and this is released in autumn. The asexual wasp emerges in spring and lays her eggs in the oak catkins. These develop into small oval galls which produce the sexual generation of wasps. A yew artichoke gall caused by the fly Taxomyia taxi also exists, but is unrelated to the oak-borne species. Previous names or synonyms for the species A. fecundator are A. fecundatrix, A. pilosus, A. foecundatrix (see below), A. gemmarum, A. gemmae, A. gemmaequercus, A. gemmaecinaraeformis and A. quercusgemmae.

The scientific name is now once again Andricus foecundatrix.

== Galls ==
Young galls exhibit a tuft of long hairs protruding from the centre of the 'artichoke', the remainder being overlapping scales. The hairs are attached to the more solid gall which is released and drops to the ground from August onwards. After August the 'gall' is still visible, but it is really just the distorted leaf bud after the gall has fallen. A well grown specimen can be 2.0 cm long, dark green or russet, generally developing in June and reaching its full size before autumn.

The hairy catkin galls are oval, pointed, unilocular and unilarval structures, 0.3 cm long, changing colour from pale green to brown. The hairs are whitish in appearance. The wasps of the sexual generation are sometimes known by the synonym Andricus fecundator forma pilosus (DvL 1982).

The gall wasp which emerges from the gall chamber in spring will always be an asexual female. But she will proceed to lay eggs on oak catkins, with a preference for Q. robur over Q. petraea, which develop into 'hairy catkin galls'. The oak artichoke gall is more common on bush or scrub than tree oaks.

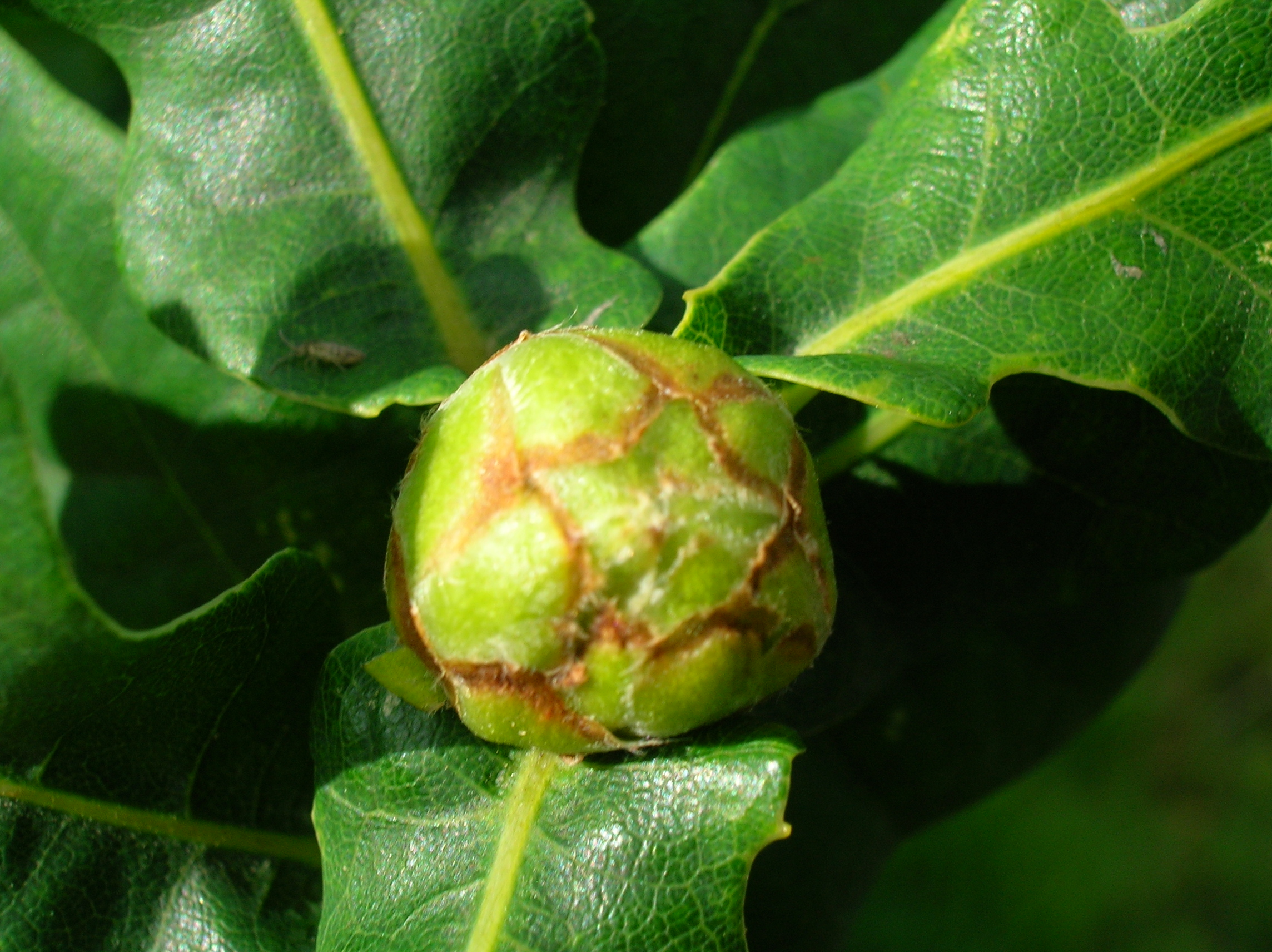
Detail of oak artichoke gall

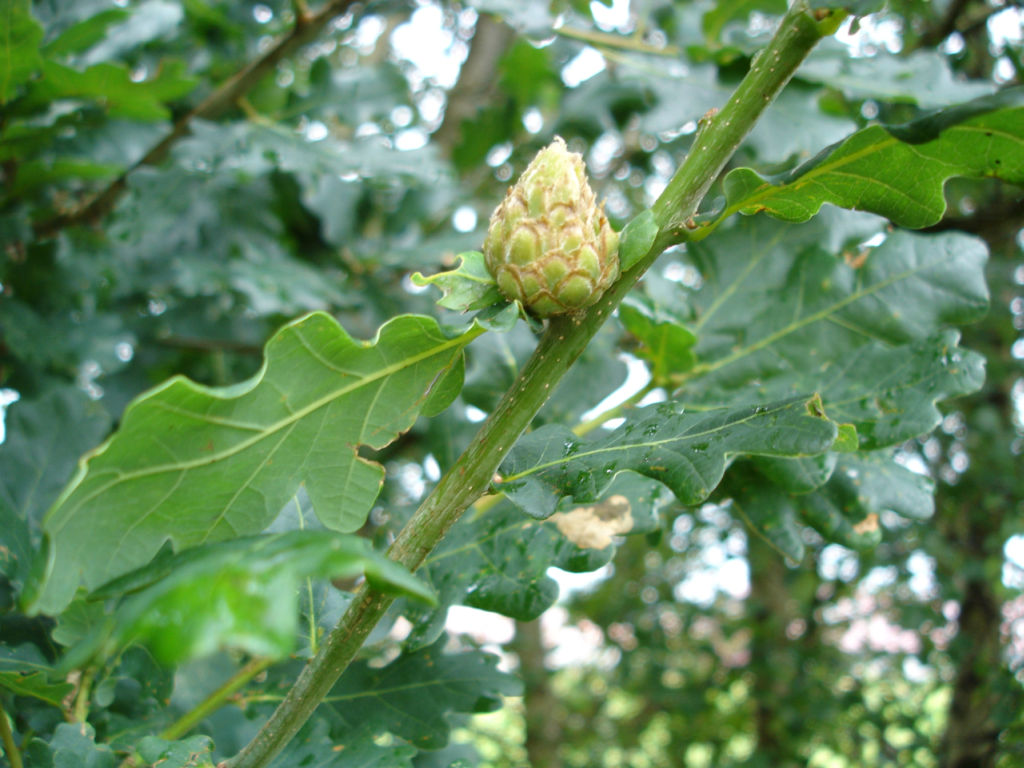
Oak artichoke gall on an axillary bud

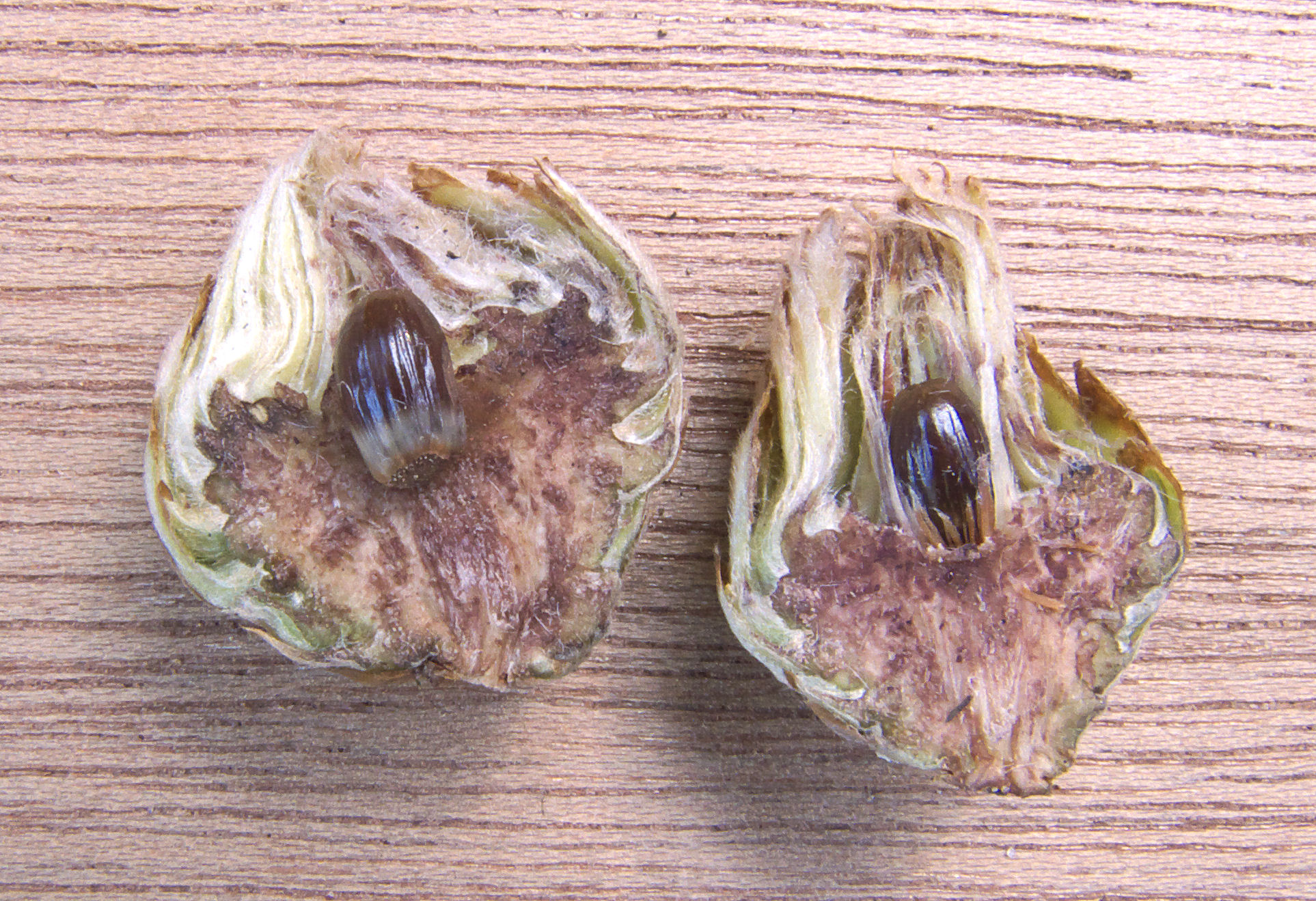
Oak artichoke gall with 8 mm–long gall chamber

== Life cycle ==
The wasps emerging from the oak artichoke galls will be female; and these females will go on to lay a solitary egg in the male flowers of the oaks, which will cause the formation of the 'hairy catkin galls.' The flies that arise form these galls are of both sexes and the cycle then starts again after they have mated and eggs are laid in the oak buds.

Once the oak artichoke gall has fallen to the ground the imago may leave the gall in the following spring, or may delay the emergence for 2–3 years. Galls may persist and exhibit opened scales curving outwards.

== Gall-forming insects ==
Some herbivorous insects therefore create their own micro-habitats by forming usually highly distinctive plant structures called galls, made of plant tissue but controlled by the insect. Galls act as both the habitat, and food sources for the progeny of the gall wasp. The artichoke gall is formed entirely from the bud and is composed of nutritious starch and other tissues. Some galls act as "physiologic sinks", concentrating resources in the gall from the surrounding plant parts. Galls may also provide the insect with physical protection from predators.

== Predators, inquilines and parasitoids ==
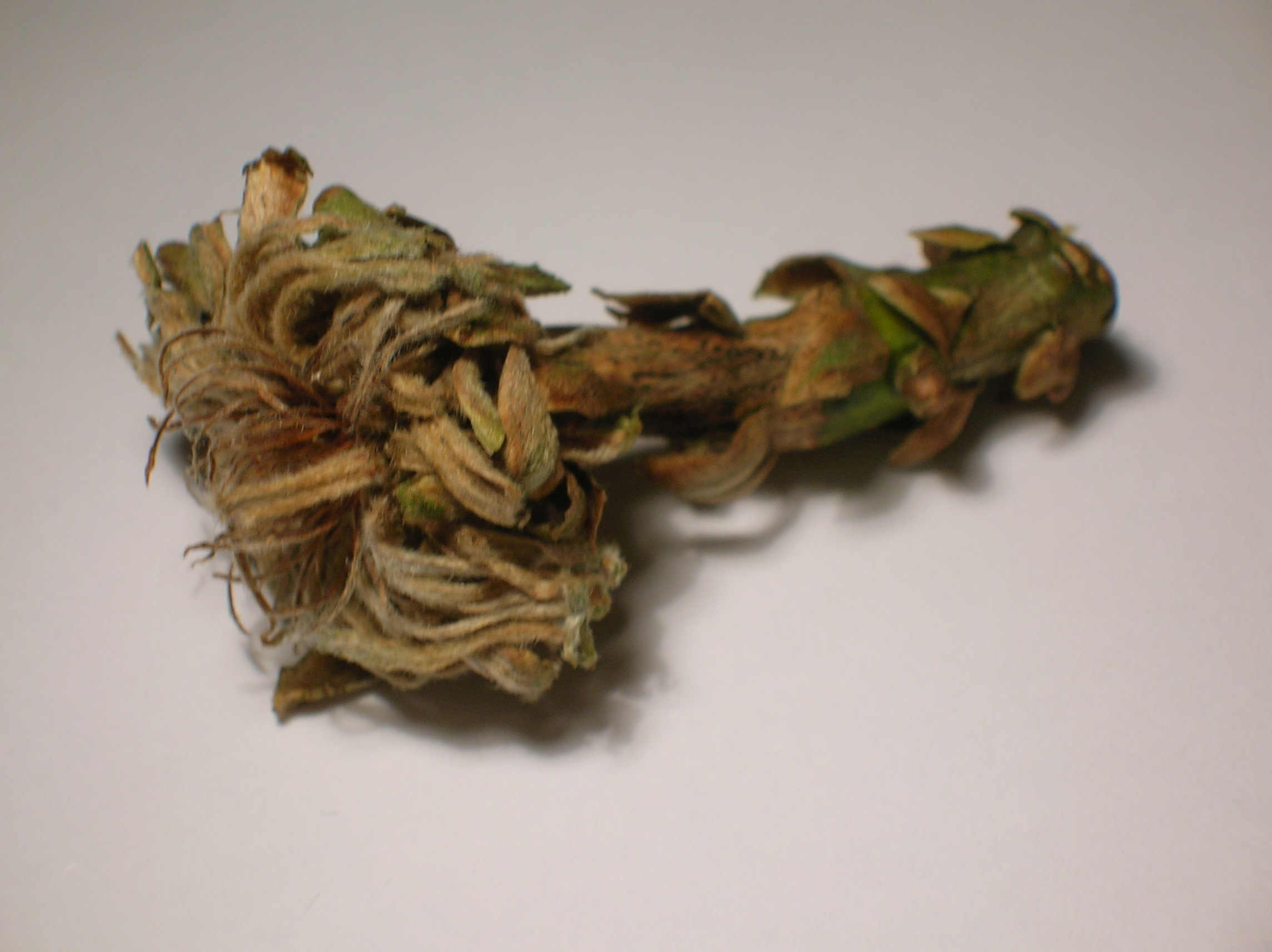
Oak artichoke gall in winter

Mature galls are sometimes broken open by vertebrate predators to recover the larva or pupa.

A number of insect inquilines live harmlessly within the oak artichoke gall and some of these, as well as Andricus itself, are parasitised by insects referred to as parasitoids. Some fungi may infect and kill the A. fecundator larvae.

Andricus curvator, the causative agent of the 'collared-bud gall' shows a marked preference for depositing its eggs on buds already colonised by A. fecundator. This may represent an early phase in the development of the inquiline mode of life.

== Infestations ==
Removing and destroying oak artichoke galls before they dry and the wasps emerge may help to reduce the infestation. While fairly large, and sometimes present in quite large numbers on scrub specimens, they cause no measurable harm.

== See also ==
- Alder tongue gall
- Eriophyes tiliae
- Gall
- Gall wasp
- Knopper gall
- Oak apple
- Oak marble gall
- Pineapple gall
- Rhabdophaga rosaria
- Rose bedeguar gall
