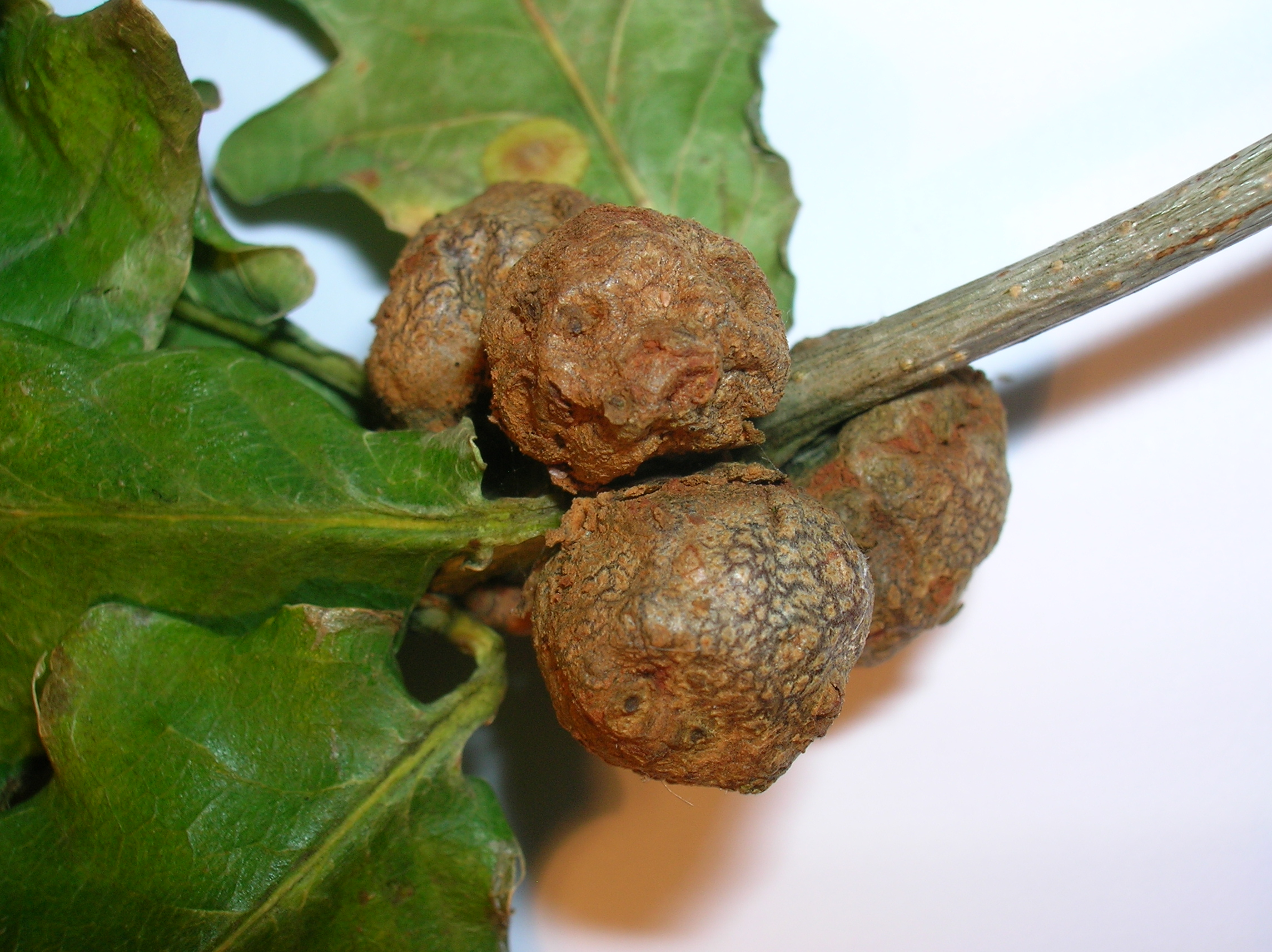
- Mature galls on pedunculate oak

Scientific classification
- Kingdom: Animalia
- Phylum: Arthropoda
- Clade: Pancrustacea
- Class: Insecta
- Order: Hymenoptera
- Family: Cynipidae
- Genus: Andricus
- Species: A. lignicola

Binomial name
- Andricus lignicola (Hartig, 1840)

= Andricus lignicola =

Cola-nut gall

Species of wasp

Cola-nut galls develop as a chemically induced distortion of leaf axillary or terminal buds on pedunculate oak (Quercus robur) or sessile oak (Quercus petraea) trees, caused by the agamic gall wasp Andricus lignicola (Hartig, 1840) which lays single eggs within leaf buds using their ovipositor. A previous name or synonym for the species A. lignicola is A. lignicolus and A. venheurni.

== Physical appearance ==
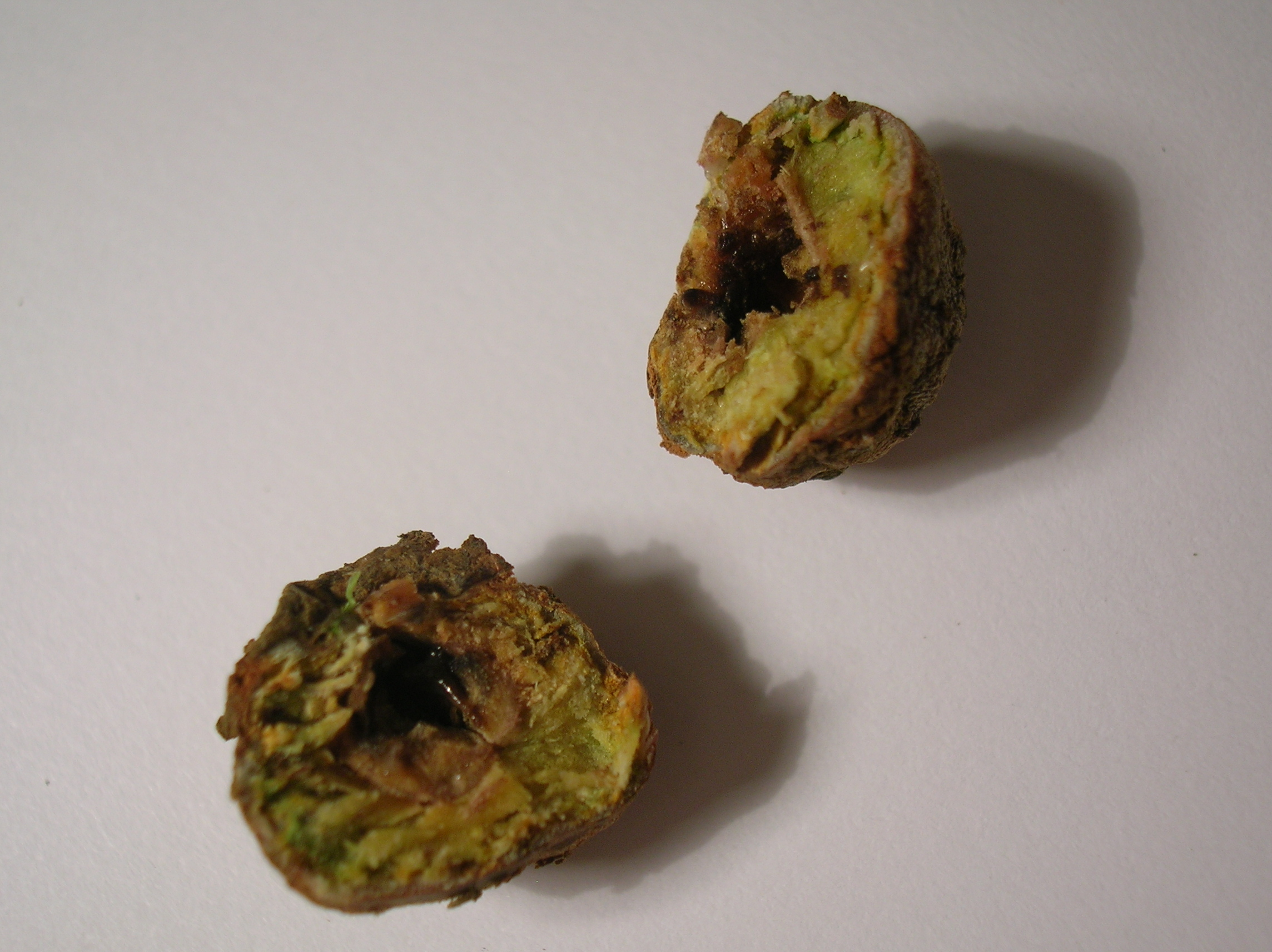
Cola-nut gall cut open to show the unilocular cavity

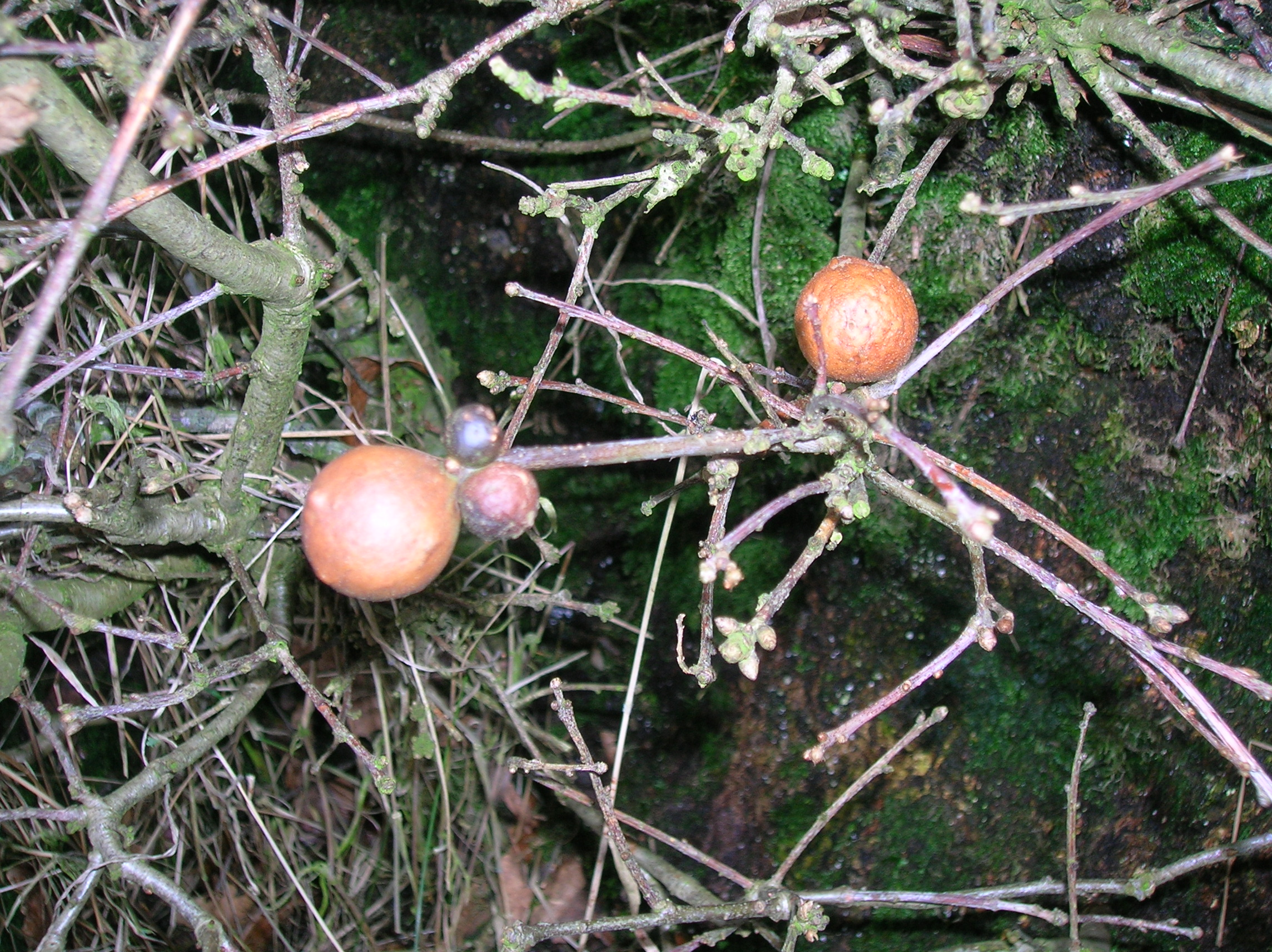
Oak marble galls showing two stunted and two normal-sized examples

The galls are found in small groups, which however do not coalesce, distinguishing them from the oak marble gall (Andricus kollari); in addition the shape is ovoid rather than spherical and the surface is scaly rather than smooth. It grows up to about 10 x 8 mm and is at first green, rapidly changing to grey-brown, with light red patches where the original bud scales have separated. It is hard and firm, but does not always persist on the tree for very long. Once the imago has emerged a small circular hole is apparent.

== Distribution ==
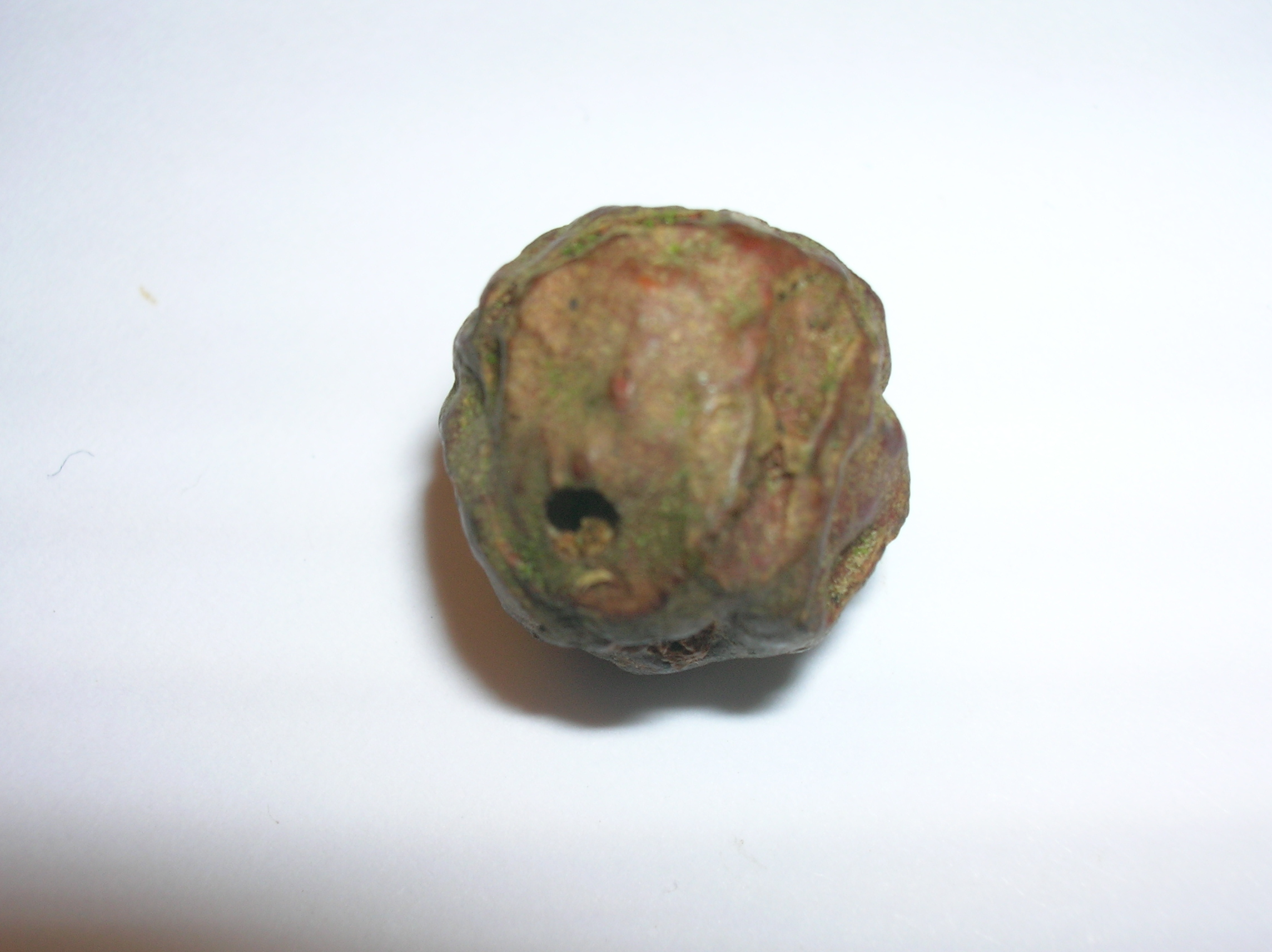
Cola-nut gall showing exit hole

It is well known in continental Europe, occurring from Great Britain to Asia Minor.

== Life-cycle ==
The imago of the agamic phase emerges in early summer following the gall's inception. The bisexual generation gall is very similar to that of A. kollari, effecting the live bud of Quercus species and has only been seen under culture conditions (1975). Removing and destroying cola-nut galls before they dry and the wasps emerge may help to reduce an infestation. While fairly large, and sometimes present in quite large numbers on scrub specimens, they cause no measurable harm.

== See also ==
- Gall
- Gall wasp
- Knopper gall
- Oak apple
- Oak marble gall
- Pineapple gall
- Red-pea gall
- Rose bedeguar gall
