= Tree of the Year (Portugal) =

Annual award for special trees in Portugal

Tree of the Year (Portugal) (Portugal)

The Tree of the Year (Portuguese: Árvore do Ano) competition is held every winter in Portugal. Nominated trees are shortlisted by a panel of experts, before going to public votes to select the winner tree of that year. The panel then selects one of these to become Portugal's tree of the year and be nominated for that year's European Tree of the Year, an annual contest held to find the most "loveable" tree in Europe.

The contest is held by the Environmental Partnership Association (EPA), an organization supported by the European Land Owners Association and the European Commission.

Portugal won the European Tree of the Year award in 2018 with the Sobreiro Monumental. The competition has been run in Portugal each year since 2018.

== Winners ==
Portugal has had 8 national winners, one of whom has also won at the continental level. Some of these trees include the oldest cork oak in the world, the Sobreiro Monumental, the 180 year old Plane Tree of Rossio, the 150 year old Eucalyptus of Contige and the 300 year old Camélia.

Most of Portugal’s annual winners are Oaks, a common type of tree in the country, that includes their national tree since 2011, the Cork Oak.

As of 2025 all of Portugal's winner trees are from different districts, one from Braga, Vila Real, Viseu, Coimbra, Portalegre, Évora, Setúbal and Beja, in the municipalities of Guimarães, Vila Pouca de Aguiar, Sátão, Coimbra, Portalegre, Arraiolos, Palmela and Mértola, respectively.

Portugal Tree of the Year winners
Year	Photo	Location	Name	Species	European Tree of the Year
2018		Águas de Moura, Palmela	Sobreiro Monumental	Quercus suber	1st Place
2019		Mértola	Secular Holm Oak from Monte Barbeiro	Quercus rotundifolia	3rd Place
2020		Vila Pouca de Aguiar	The Chestnut Tree from Vales	Castanea sativa	6th Place
2021		Portalegre	Plane Tree of Rossio	Platanus × hispanica	4th Place
2022		Arraiolos	The Big Cork Oak	Quercus suber	3rd Place
2023		Sátão	Eucalyptus of Contige	Eucalyptus globulus	5th Place
2024		Guimarães	Camélia	Camellia japonica	4th Place
2025		Santa Clara, Coimbra	The Lovers Banyan Tree	Ficus subg. Urostigma	ongoing

== See also ==
- European Tree of the Year
- Tree of the Year (United Kingdom)
- List of individual trees
