= Lucombe's Seedling =

Apple cultivar

Lucombe's Seedling, also known as Kirton Fair, Newquay Prizetaker, and Uncle Barney, is a dessert or eating apple once popular in counties of Devon and Cornwall.

== Characterics ==
The skin of this apple is pale yellow/green with crimson streaks and dotted with dark spots. Quite large and angular with stout short thick stalk. Its flavour is described as 'pleasant juicy white flesh with a spicy, subacid flavour'.

== Heritage ==
Originally from Kirton or Crediton, this apple comes from the 'Lucombe & Pince nursery' at St Thomas, Exeter. It was most popular in Crediton, where it is known locally as Kirton Fair. It was also popular in West Cornwall where it was sold as the 'Newquay Prizetaker'.

== Habit and growth ==
Not very vigorous and fruits in the mid to very late season.
