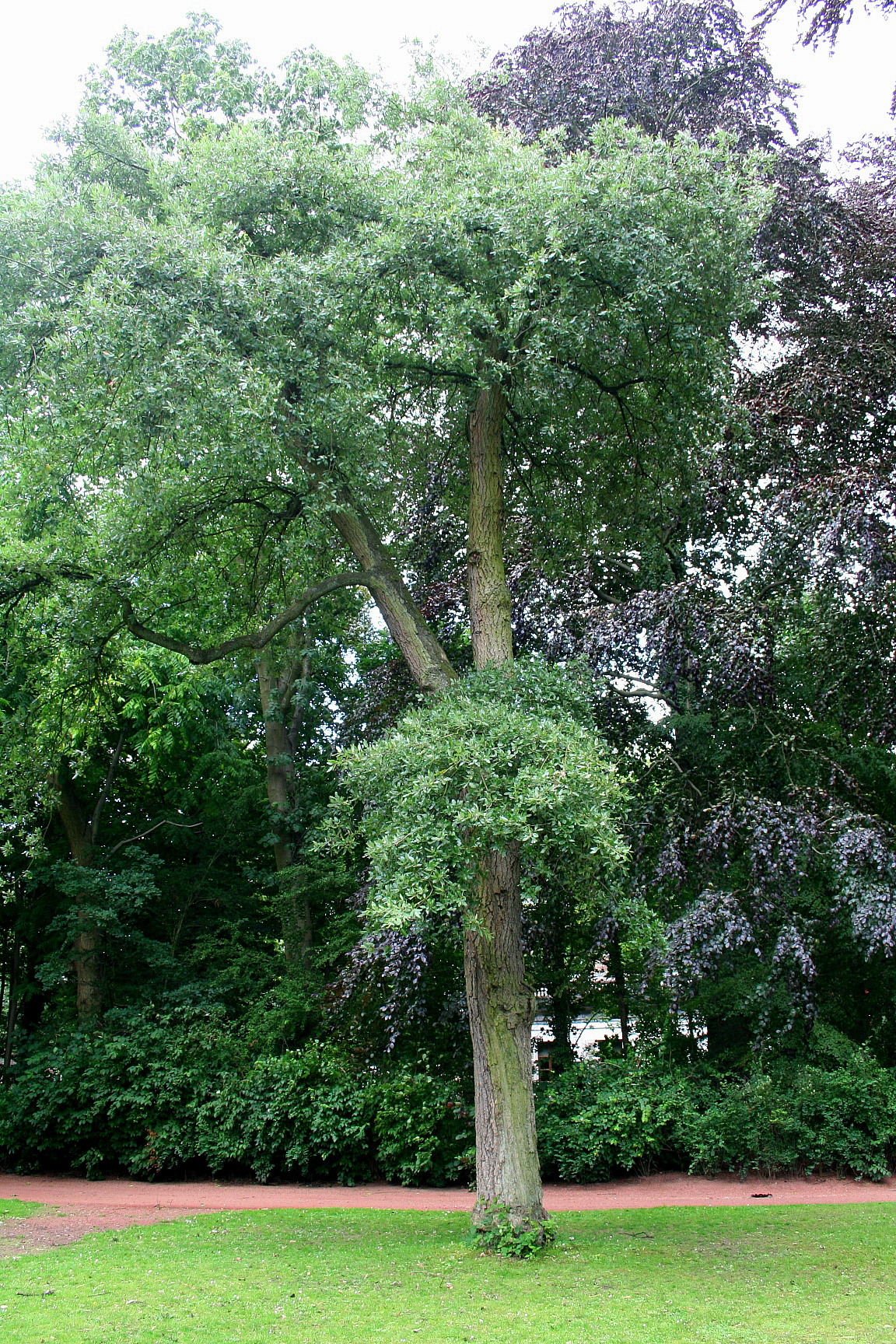

Scientific classification
- Kingdom: Plantae
- Clade: Tracheophytes
- Clade: Angiosperms
- Clade: Eudicots
- Clade: Rosids
- Order: Fagales
- Family: Fagaceae
- Genus: Quercus
- Subgenus: Quercus subg. Cerris
- Section: Quercus sect. Cerris
- Species: Q. × hispanica

Binomial name
- Quercus × hispanica Lam.

Synonyms
- List: Cerris × suberosa Gand., opus utique oppr.; Quercus × aegilopifolia Boiss. ex Endl., nom. inval.; Quercus × bivonana Guss.; Quercus cerris var. crispa Loudon; Quercus cerris var. dentata (P.Watson) Loudon; Quercus cerris subvar. fulhamensis (Loudon) Dippel; Quercus cerris var. fulhamensis Loudon; Quercus cerris var. heterophylla Loudon; Quercus cerris var. incisa Loudon; Quercus cerris var. lucombeana Loudon; Quercus cerris subvar. lucombeana (Loudon) Dippel; Quercus cerris var. suberosa Loudon; Quercus cerris var. subperennis A.DC.; Quercus × crenata Lam.; Quercus × dentata P.Watson, nom. illeg.; Quercus × exoniensis Lodd. ex Sweet; Quercus × fulhamensis Steud.; Quercus × fulhamensis var. lucombeana Loudon) Zabel; Quercus × haliphleos Guss.; Quercus × hispanica var. crispa (Ludon) Rehder; Quercus × hispanica var. dentata (P.Watson) Rehder; Quercus × hispanica var. diversifolia (A.Henry) Rehder; Quercus × hispanica var. gussonei (A.DC.) A.Camus; Quercus × hispanica var. heterophylla (Loudon) Rehder; Quercus × hispanica var. latifolia Rehder nom. superfl.; Quercus × hispanica subvar. latifolia (Rehder) A.Camus; Quercus × hispanica var. lucombeana (Loudon) Rehder; Quercus × hispanica var. pseudosuber (Santi) A.Camus; Quercus ilex var. diversifolia G.Nicholson, nom. nud.; Quercus × incisa Steud., pro syn.; Quercus × lucombeana (Loudon) de Vos; Quercus × lucombeana var. crispa (Loudon) K.Koch; Quercus × lucombeana var. diversifolia A.Henry; Quercus × lucombeana var. fulhamensis-latifolia A.Henry; Quercus × lucombeana var. heterophylla (Loudon) A.Henry; Quercus × pacensis F.M.Vázquez; Quercus × pseudoaustriaca Lojac.; Quercus × pseudocerris Lojac.; Quercus × pseudosuber Santi; Quercus × pseudosuber var. castaneifolia Wenz.; Quercus × pseudosuber var. gibraltarica A.DC.; Quercus × pseudosuber var. gussonei A.DC. Parl.; Quercus suber var. bivonana (Guss.) Parl.

= Quercus × hispanica =

Hybrid species of oak tree

Quercus × hispanica, commonly known as Spanish oak, is tree in the family Fagaceae. It is a semideciduous hybrid between the European trees Turkey oak (Quercus cerris) and cork oak (Quercus suber).

== Taxonomy ==
The taxon was first described as the species Quercus hispanica by Jean-Baptiste Lamarck in 1785. As of October 2024, Plants of the World Online treated it as the hybrid between the European species Quercus cerris (Turkey oak) and Quercus suber (cork oak) using the hybrid name Quercus × hispanica. In this treatment, one of its many synonyms is Quercus × crenata, which may also be treated as a separate species.

== Distribution ==
Hybridisation occurs naturally in southwestern Europe where both parent species occur. The Lucombe oak cultivar is frequently found in British collections. To be a true Lucombe oak, cultivars must be clones of the original hybrid arising in William Lucombe's Exeter nursery.

== Cultivation ==
A number of named cultivars are grown in gardens, parks, arboreta and botanical gardens.

=== Cultivars ===
- Quercus × hispanica 'Lucombeana' ("Lucombe oak"), originally raised by William Lucombe at his Exeter, UK nursery in 1762. An early Lucombe Oak is in Kew Gardens arboretum, and is regarded as one of their 'heritage trees'. The Tree Register of the British Isles−TROBI Champion is at Phear Park in Exmouth, measuring 26 metres (85 ft) in height, with a trunk diameter of 261 centimetres (103 in) in 2008.
- Quercus × hispanica 'Waasland' ("Waasland select oak"), leaves display an unusual slender, lobed shape.
- Quercus × hispanica 'Wageningen' ("Wageningen oak")
- Quercus × hispanica 'Fulhamensis' ("Fulham oak")
