= Tree of the Year =

Tree of the Year may refer to:

- European Tree of the Year
- Tree of the Year (United Kingdom)
- Tree of the Year (Portugal)
