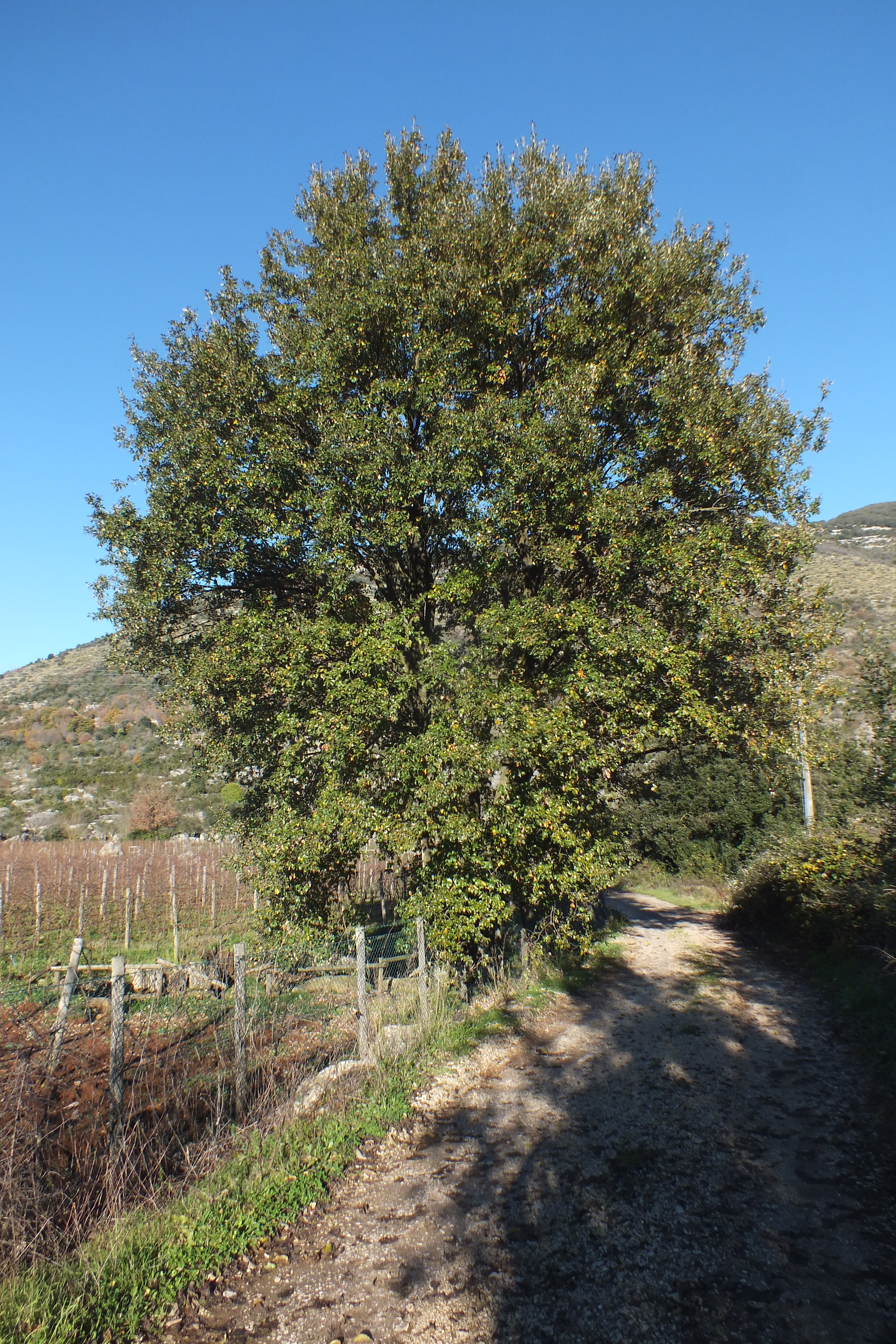

Scientific classification
- Kingdom: Plantae
- Clade: Tracheophytes
- Clade: Angiosperms
- Clade: Eudicots
- Clade: Rosids
- Order: Fagales
- Family: Fagaceae
- Genus: Quercus
- Subgenus: Quercus subg. Cerris
- Section: Quercus sect. Cerris
- Species: Q. × crenata

Binomial name
- Quercus × crenata Lam.

= Quercus × crenata =

Species of plant

Quercus × crenata is a tree in the family Fagaceae. Its taxonomic status is uncertain, as sources vary how they treat it. As of October 2024, Plants of the World Online treated Quercus × crenata as a synonym of Quercus × hispanica, and hence as a hybrid between the European trees Turkey oak (Quercus cerris) and cork oak (Quercus suber). A 2007 molecular phylogenetic study supported the hybrid origin of the taxon, but used the specific epithet crenata rather than hispanica. As of October 2024, the World Flora Online treated the taxon as a separate species, Quercus crenata, a view also taken in a 2018 study, where it is considered to be endemic to the Italian Peninsula.
