= Sobreiro Monumental =

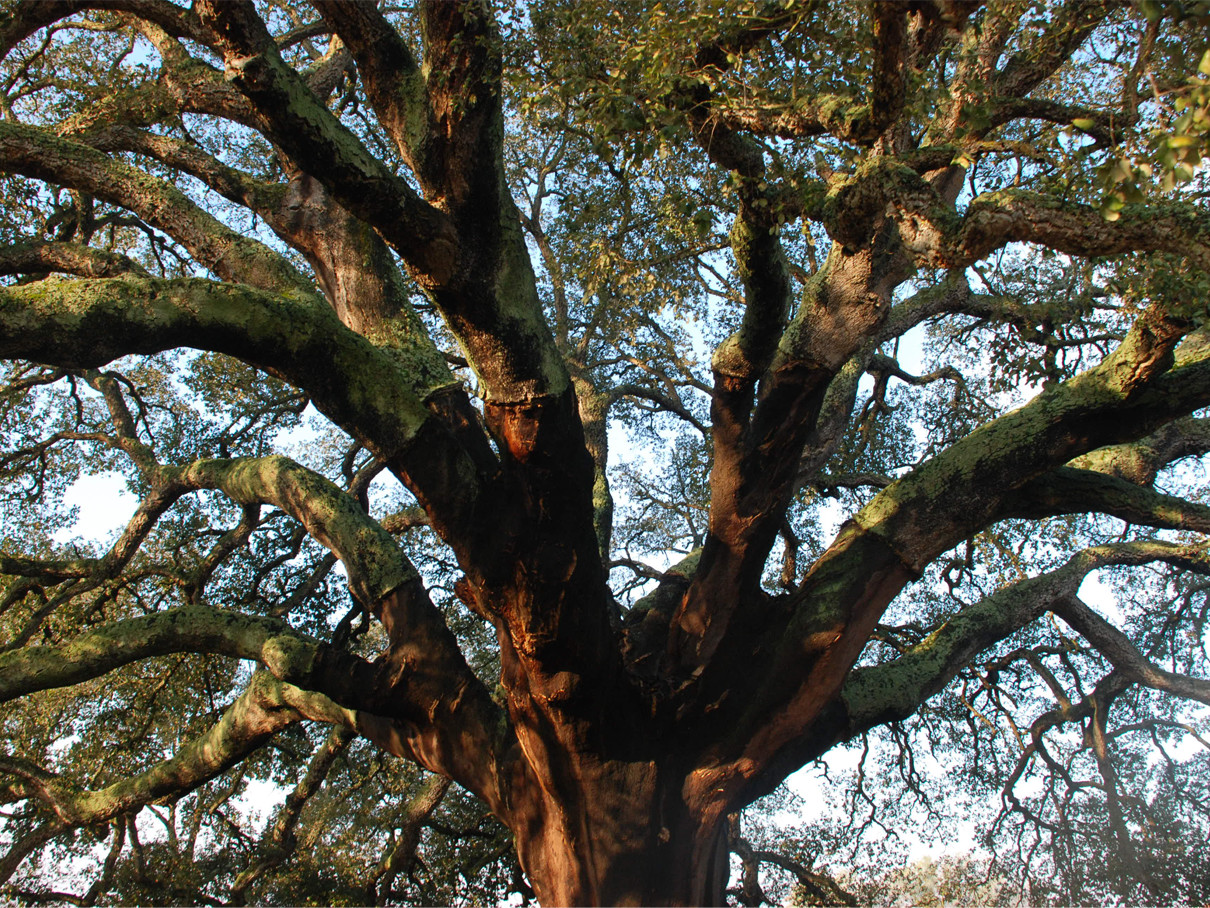
- The Whistler Tree in January 2018
- Species: Cork oak (Quercus suber)
- Location: Águas de Moura, Palmela, Portugal
- Coordinates: 38°35′12″N 8°41′28″W
- Date seeded: 1784
- Custodian: Instituto da Conservação da Natureza e das Florestas (ICNF)

The Sobreiro Monumental (Monumental Cork Oak), also known as The Whistler Tree, is a 236 year old cork oak from Águas de Moura, Palmela, Portugal. It was voted European Tree of the Year in 2018, it has been classified as "Tree of Public Interest" since 1988 and is registered in the Guinness Book of Records as "the largest cork oak in the world".

It is around 16.2 m (53 ft) tall with a circumference at breast height of 4.15 m (14 ft).

It was planted in 1783–1784, during the reign of Queen Maria I, and since 1820 it has been harvested over 20 times. 1991 was a particularly prolific year, as it yielded over 1,200 kg (2,646 lb) of cork, producing more than 100.000 cork stoppers, more than what an average cork tree would produce in its lifetime.

The name 'Whistler Tree' comes from the whistling sound of the birds that land on its branches.

In 2000 the tree was almost taken down, along with 411 other cork oaks, as an illegal urban expansion took place. By 2001 the law was reformed to better protect the oaks.

Views of Sobreiro Monumental - the whistling cork oak

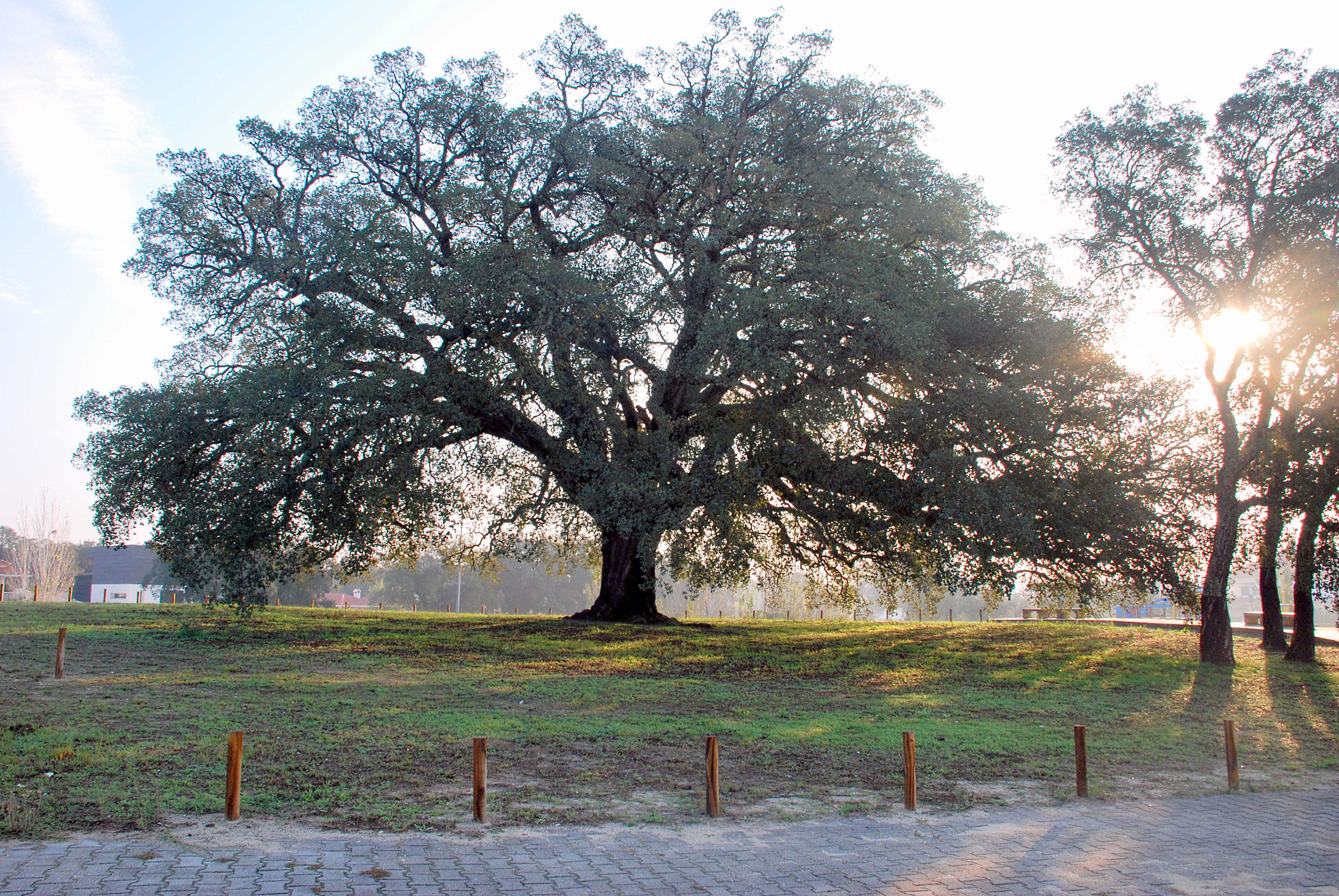

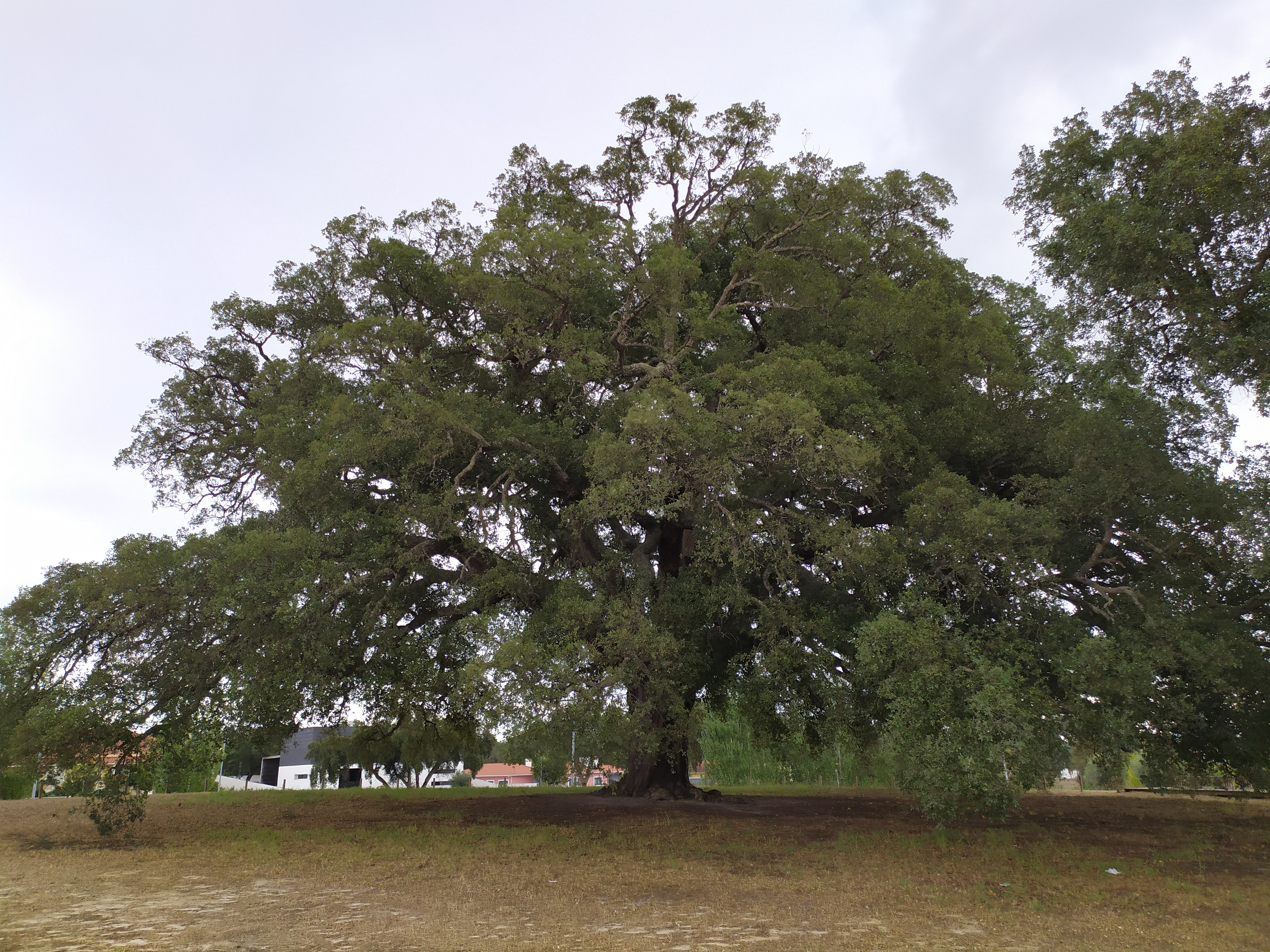

== See also ==
- List of individual trees
