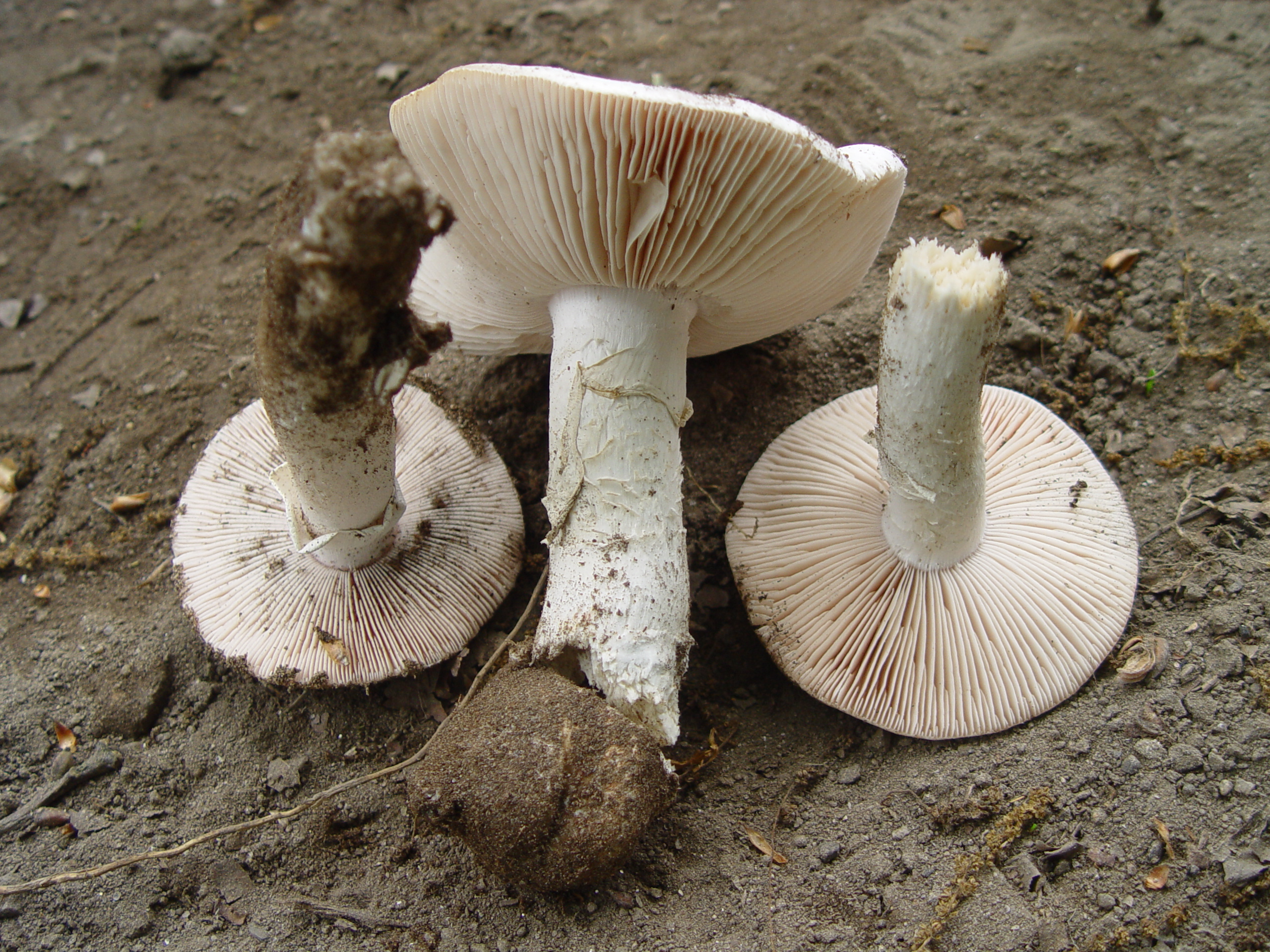

Scientific classification
- Kingdom: Fungi
- Division: Basidiomycota
- Class: Agaricomycetes
- Order: Agaricales
- Family: Amanitaceae
- Genus: Amanita
- Species: A. gilbertii

Binomial name
- Amanita gilbertii Beauseign. 1925

= Amanita gilbertii =

Species of fungus

Amanita gilbertii or Gilbert's limbed lepidella is a species of Amanita from France and Germany.
