= William Lucombe =

British botanist

William Lucombe (before 1720 – 1794) was a horticulturalist and nurseryman, who discovered and gave his name to the natural hybrid Lucombe Oak (Quercus × hispanica 'Lucombeana'), a semi-deciduous oak tree.

== The Lucombe nursery ==
William Lucombe began his horticultural career as Head Gardener in the service of merchant Thomas Ball at Mamhead Park in Devon circa 1720. It was while working at Mamhead that he founded his nursery, the first commercial plant nursery in South West England, marketing many of the plants collected by Ball during the latter's commercial travels abroad, most famously the holm oak. Lucombe bred his eponymous oak at the nursery he founded in 1740 at Bowhill in St Thomas, Exeter. In 1794, his son John Lucombe took possession of the nursery on Alphington Road, later known as the Exeter Nursery. In 1801, Benjamin Pince became a partner in the business, and by 1807 the nursery enterprise was trading as 'John Lucombe, Pince & Co'. At this time they bought the adjoining nursery of William Ford and Son on Alphington Street. In 1824, John Lucombe sold the business to Captain Robert Pince for £1500. The nursery flourished under his son Robert Taylor Pince, but began to decline in the late 19th century, and the site was sold to the city of Exeter in 1912. Part of the land became Pince's Gardens, a public park, part allotments and the remainder housing.

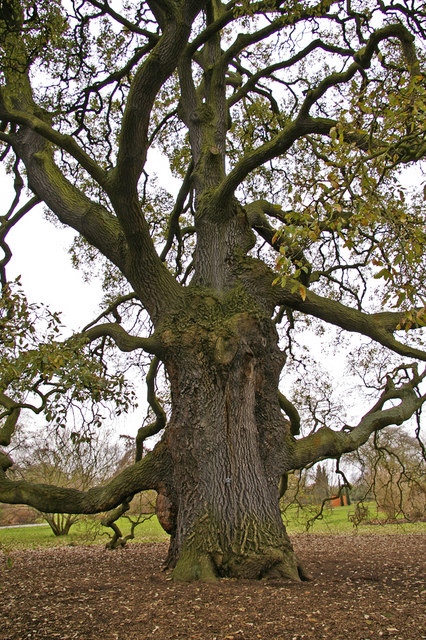
Main trunk of the Lucombe Oak at Kew Gardens.

=== Lucombe Oaks ===
The natural hybrid Lucombe Oak was first spotted in 1762 when Lucombe noticed that one of the saplings produced from a Turkey Oak acorn he had planted kept its leaves in winter. He later observed that these features occurred where both parent species grew, Quercus cerris (Turkey Oak) and Quercus suber (Cork Oak). True Lucombe Oaks are clones of the original tree, but the name 'Lucombe Oak' is also often used to refer to any Spanish Oak, a frequently occurring hybrid between Turkey Oaks and Cork Oaks. The Lucombe Oak is a large semi-evergreen tree developing a deeply furrowed bark when mature. Leaves to about 12 x 5 cm, glossy dark green above, grey beneath and edged with sharp teeth. Raised at the Lucombe nursery, Exeter from seed of Q. cerris in about 1763. It produces viable seed, and many seedlings have been distributed.

One of the early Lucombe Oaks went to Kew Gardens. The current champion is at Powis Castle, Wales. Lucombe Oaks along with their descendants, which include back crosses with the naturalized Turkey Oak, are common in the landscape of East Devon, as well as in parks and gardens. A number of Lucombe Oaks are planted in the grounds of County Hall in Exeter - the headquarters of Devon County Council. The Tree Register of the British Isles−TROBI Champion is at Phear Park in Exmouth, measuring 26 metres (85 ft) in height, with a trunk diameter of 261 centimetres (103 in) in 2008.

Lucombe felled the original hybrid in 1785, keeping timber from it from which his coffin was to be made when he died. He stored the boards under his bed. However, he lived, for the age, an exceptionally long life, dying at the age of 102 years. By that time the planks had decayed in the Devon dampness. Instead, on his death, timber from one of his early graft propagations was used to make his coffin.

http://www.oaksofchevithornebarton.com/detail.cfm/plant_id/1623
