= Águas de Moura =

Coordinates: 38°35′N 8°42′W

- Village
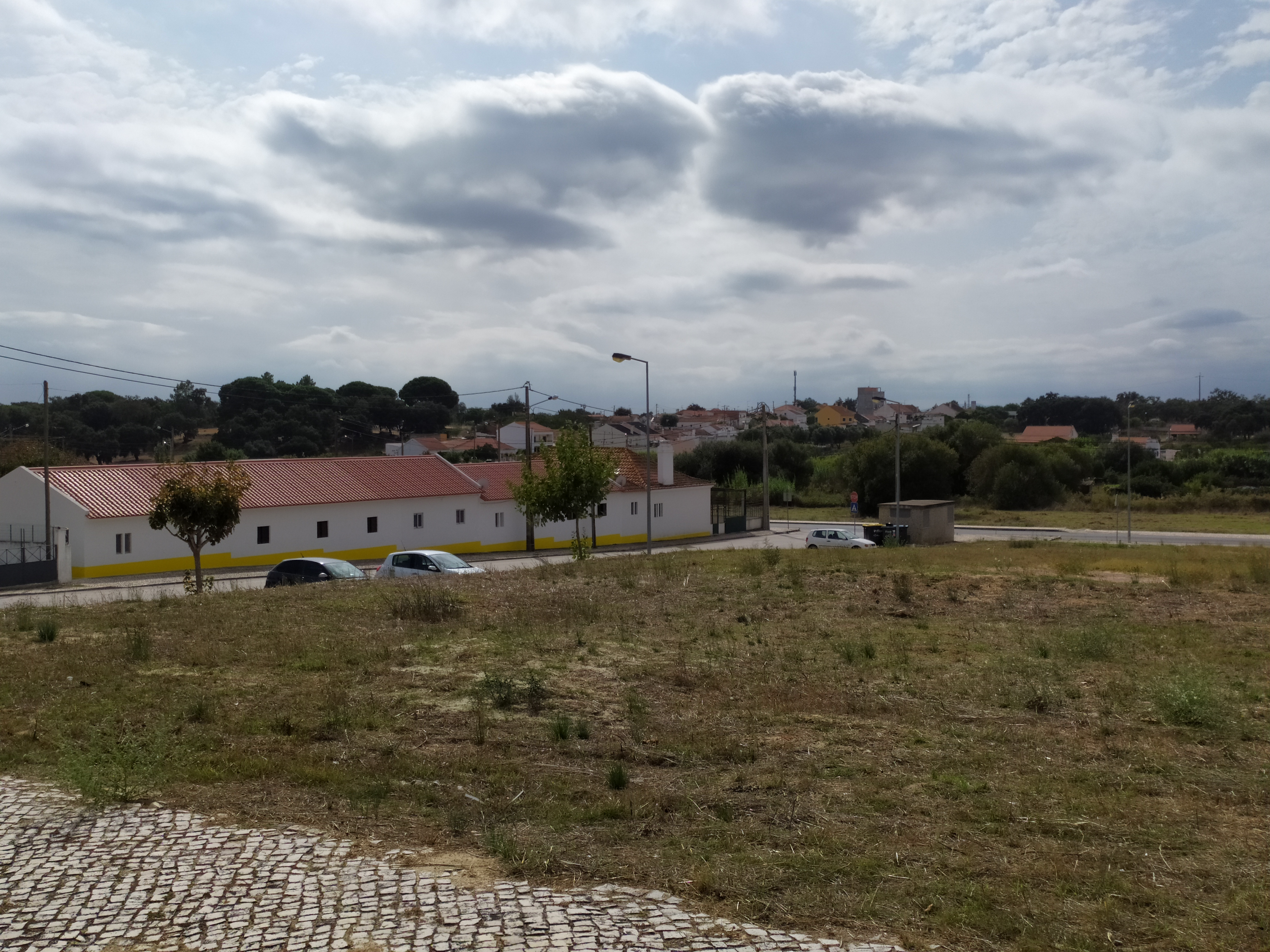
- View of Águas de Moura
- Interactive map of Águas de Moura
- Country: Portugal
- Region: Lisboa Region
- Sugregion: Península de Setúbal Subregion
- District: Setúbal District
- Municipality: Palmela Municipality

Águas de Moura (pronounced [ˈaɣwɐʒ ðɨ ˈmowɾɐ]) is a small village in the Palmela Municipality of the Setúbal District in Portugal. The village lies near the Sado River.

Águas de Moura is home to the Sobreiro Monumental (Monumental Cork Oak): a 236-year old, 14 meter high tree with a trunk that requires at least three people to embrace it. It has been considered a national monument since 1988 and the Guinness Book of Records states that it is the largest and oldest cork tree in the world.

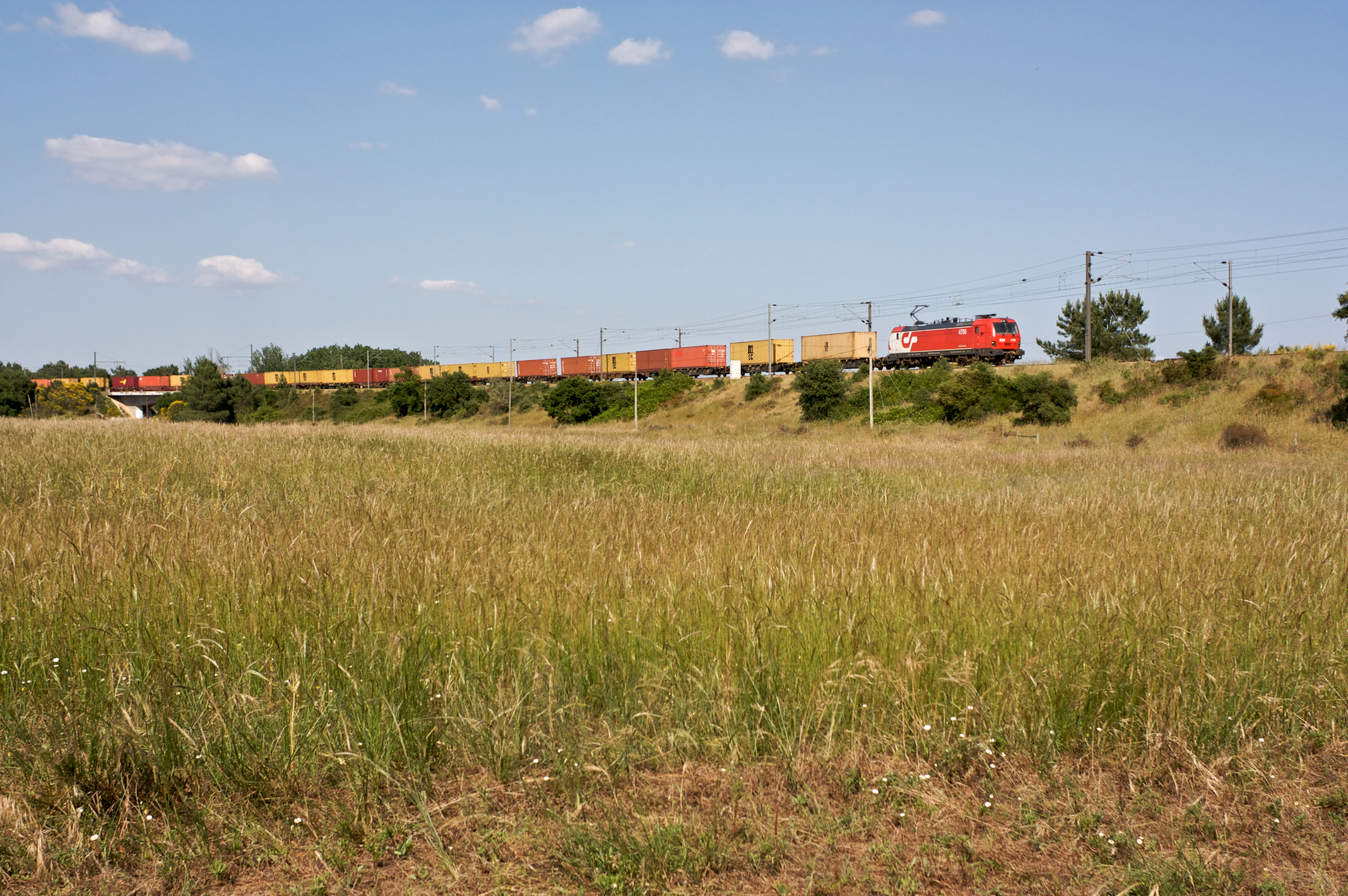
