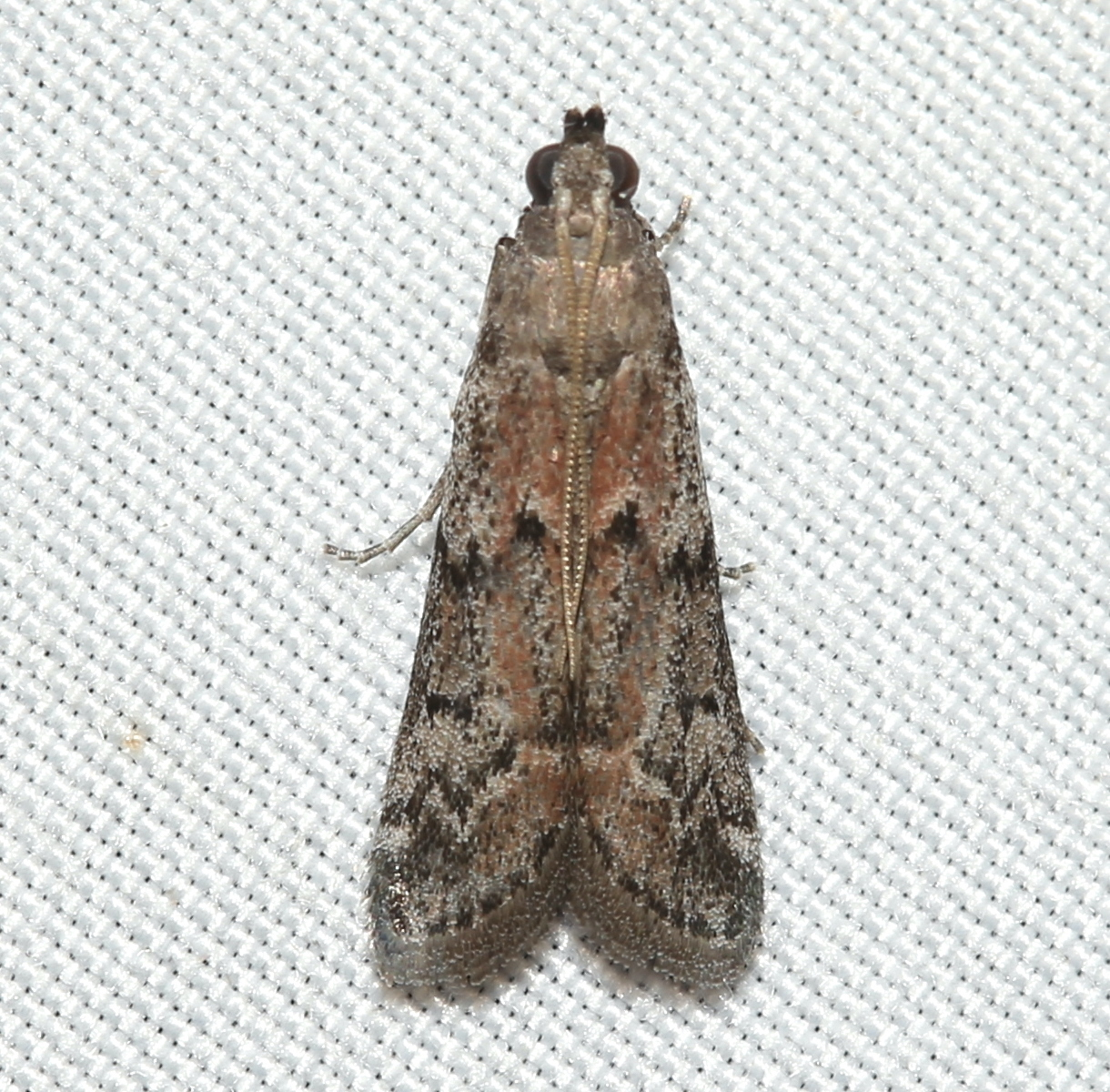
- Vitula edmandsii edmandsii

Scientific classification
- Kingdom: Animalia
- Phylum: Arthropoda
- Clade: Pancrustacea
- Class: Insecta
- Order: Lepidoptera
- Family: Pyralidae
- Genus: Vitula
- Species: V. edmandsii

Binomial name
- Vitula edmandsii (Packard, 1865)

Synonyms
- Nephopteryx edmandsii Packard, 1864; Vitula dentosella Ragonot, 1887; Vitula edmandsae Heinrich, 1956

= Vitula edmandsii =

Species of moth

Vitula edmandsii, the American wax moth or dried fruit moth, is a species of snout moth in the genus Vitula. It is found in eastern North America. It was described by Packard in 1865 who mentions early records from the USA, specifically in Cambridge, Massachusetts and Bridgeport, Connecticut - the latter where the larvae were first found in bee's nests.

In the past, some taxonomists have referred to the beehive honey moth as part of the same group, those at times claimed to be a subspecies Vitula edmandsii serratilineella Packard, 1887. Those others are instead only found in western North America, but also are found Central Europe (e.g. Germany, Denmark and Fennoscandia, where older records may list it as Vitula edmandsii

When any are referred to by the common name dried fruit moth or dried-fruit moth, there may be further confusion with Cadra calidella, another "dried fruit moth".

The wingspan is 20–25 mm (after Packard, 1865). The species has brownish hindwings. It invades beehives but is not known to be a true pest of stored-products.

== Gallery ==
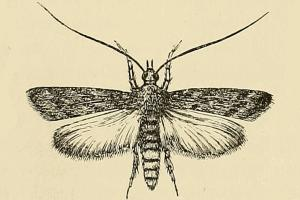
Illustration of adult of Vitula edmandsii by Packard, 1865

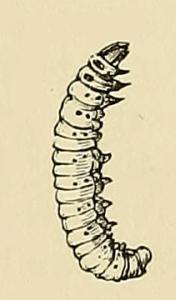
Illustration of larva of Vitula edmandsii by Packard, 1865

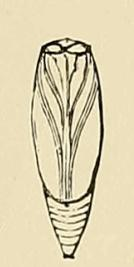
Illustration of pupa of Vitula edmandsii by Packard, 1865

== Compare with: ==
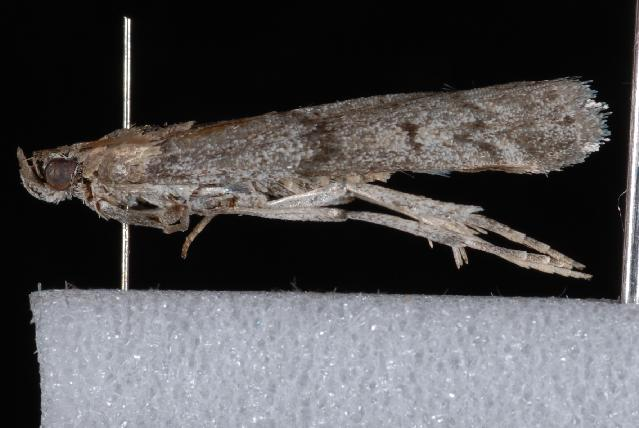
"Vitula edmandsii serratilineella" see Vitula serratilineella

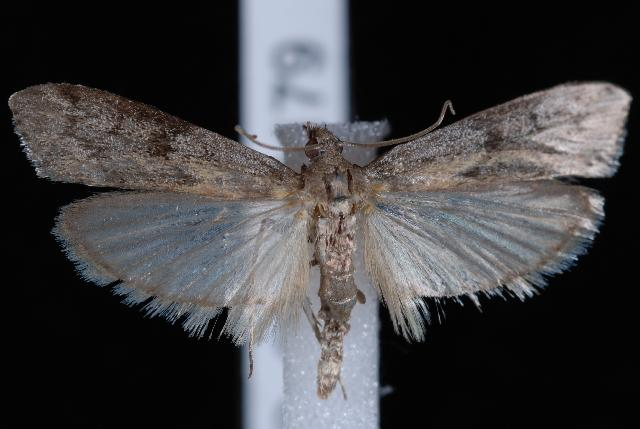
"Vitula edmandsii serratilineella "see Vitula serratilineella
