= Atrusca bella =

Scientific classification
- Kingdom: Animalia
- Phylum: Arthropoda
- Class: Insecta
- Order: Hymenoptera
- Family: Cynipidae
- Genus: Atrusca
- Species: A. bella

Binomial name
- Atrusca bella (Bassett, 1881)

North American gall-inducing wasp

Atrusca bella, also known as the little oak-apple gall wasp, is a locally common species of cynipid wasp that produces galls on oak trees in North America. The wasp oviposits on Arizona white oak, Mexican blue oak, netleaf oak, Toumey oak, and shrub live oak. The larval chamber is at the center of the gall, connected to the husk by slender, radiating fibers. The gall induced by this wasp is larger, lighter-colored, and more common than the similar gall induced by Atrusca brevipennata. This wasp has been observed in Arizona and New Mexico.

== See also ==
- Oak apple
