= Vitula lugubrella =

Scientific classification
- Domain: Eukaryota
- Kingdom: Animalia
- Phylum: Arthropoda
- Class: Insecta
- Order: Lepidoptera
- Family: Pyralidae
- Genus: Vitula
- Species: V. lugubrella

Binomial name
- Vitula lugubrella (Ragonot, 1887)

Synonyms
- Hornigia lugubrella Ragonot 1887; Moodna lugubrella

Species of moth

Vitula lugubrella is a species of snout moth in the genus Vitula. It was described by Émile Louis Ragonot in 1887. It is found in North America, including California.

There are probably multiple generations per year.

The larvae live within the dried galls of Atrusca wasps which occur on gray oak (Quercus grisea).
