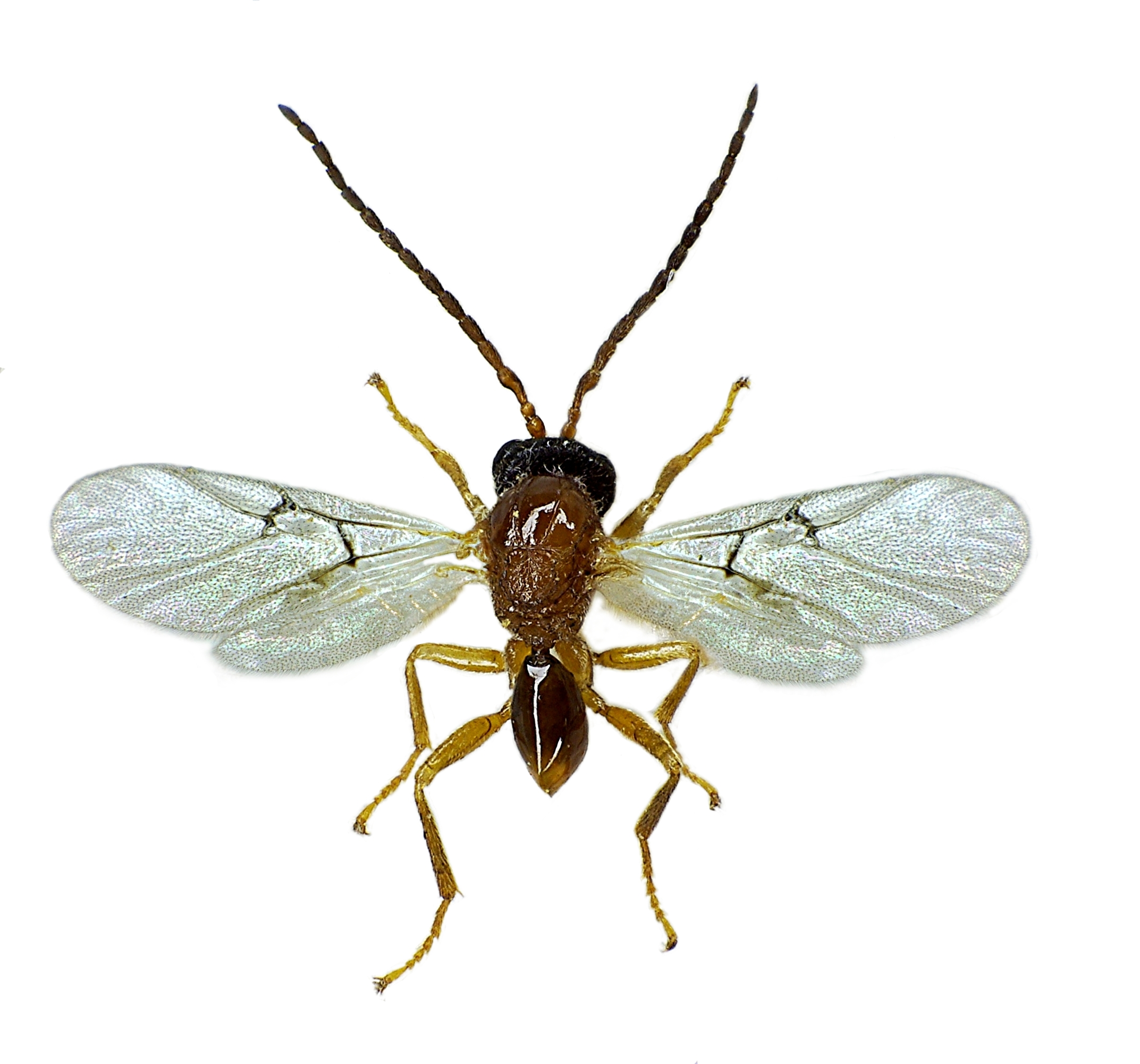
- Male Biorhiza pallida. The wings would be folded over the abdomen in life

Scientific classification
- Kingdom: Animalia
- Phylum: Arthropoda
- Class: Insecta
- Order: Hymenoptera
- Family: Cynipidae
- Genus: Biorhiza; Westwood, 1840

Species
- See text

= Biorhiza =

Genus of wasps

Biorhiza is a genus of gall wasps in the family Cynipidae in the tribe Cynipini: the oak gall wasp tribe. Cynipini is the tribe partially responsible for the formation of galls known as oak apples on oak trees. These are formed after the wasp lays eggs inside the leaf buds and the plant tissues swell as the larvae of the gall wasp develop inside.

== Species ==
The genus includes the following species:

- Biorhiza mellea Ashmead, 1887
- Biorhiza pallida (Olivier 1791)
