= Vitula inanimella =

Scientific classification
- Domain: Eukaryota
- Kingdom: Animalia
- Phylum: Arthropoda
- Class: Insecta
- Order: Lepidoptera
- Family: Pyralidae
- Genus: Vitula
- Species: V. inanimella

Binomial name
- Vitula inanimella (Dyar, 1919)

Synonyms
- Moodna inanimella Dyar, 1919; Euzophera licitoa Dyar, 1919

Species of moth

Vitula inanimella is a species of snout moth in the genus Vitula. It was described by Harrison Gray Dyar Jr. in 1919. It is found in Mexico and Guatemala.

The wingspan is 20–21 mm. Adults are suffused gray brown with transverse lines faintly indicated by very slightly darker borders.
