= Vitula coconinoana =

Scientific classification
- Domain: Eukaryota
- Kingdom: Animalia
- Phylum: Arthropoda
- Class: Insecta
- Order: Lepidoptera
- Family: Pyralidae
- Genus: Vitula
- Species: V. coconinoana

Binomial name
- Vitula coconinoana Neunzig, 1990

Species of moth

Vitula coconinoana is a species of snout moth. It was described by Herbert H. Neunzig in 1990. It has been recorded in North America from Alberta and Arizona.
