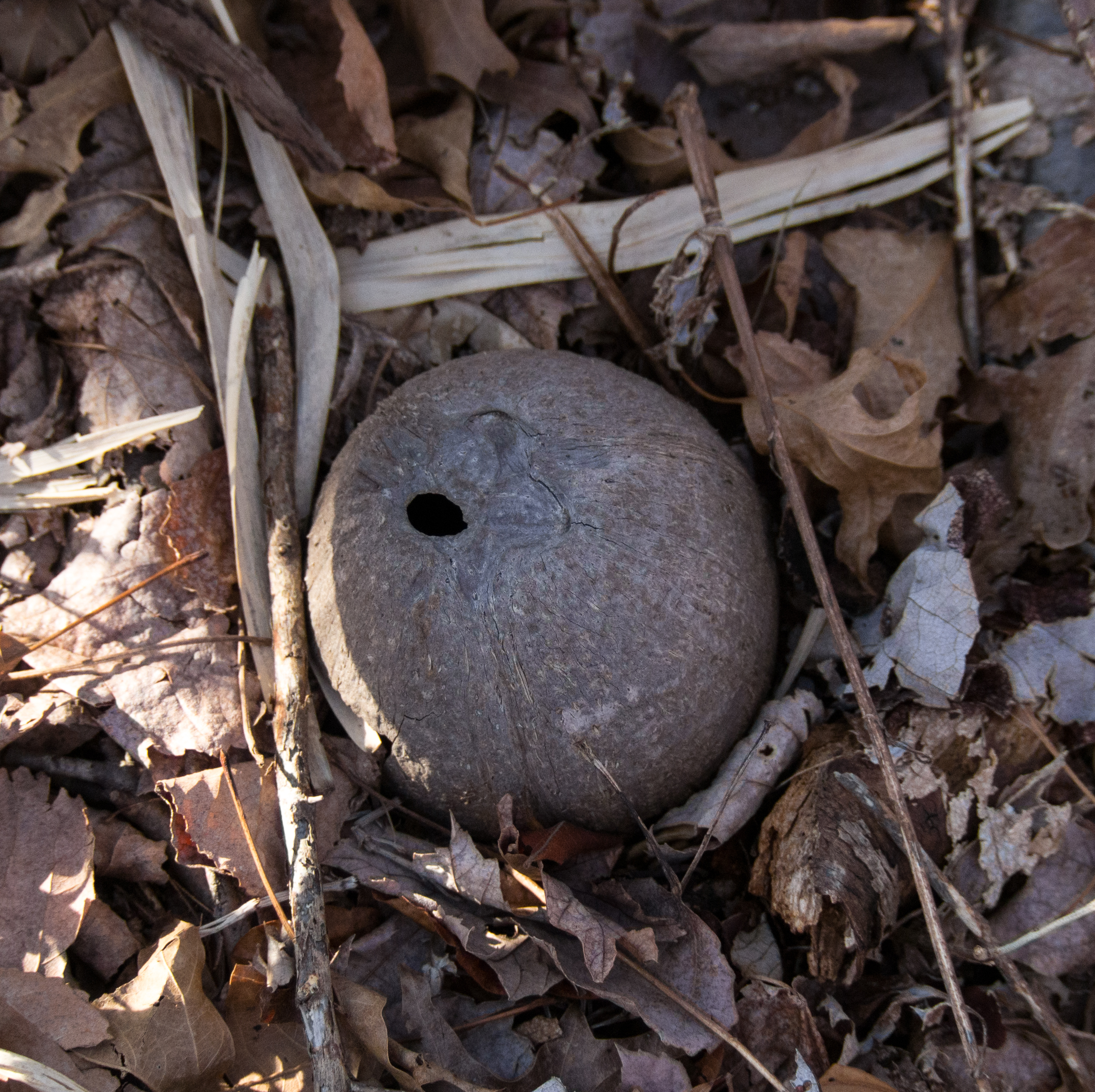
- An oak apple. Amphibolips confluenta larva forms galls from oak leaves, slightly larger than a golf ball.

Scientific classification
- Kingdom: Animalia
- Phylum: Arthropoda
- Class: Insecta
- Order: Hymenoptera
- Family: Cynipidae
- Genus: Amphibolips
- Species: A. confluenta

Binomial name
- Amphibolips confluenta (Harris, 1841)

= Amphibolips confluenta =

Species of wasp

Amphibolips confluenta, known generally as the spongy oak apple gall wasp, is a species of gall wasp in the family Cynipidae. Its range includes Ontario, Quebec, and much of the eastern United States. Hosts include Quercus buckleyi, Quercus coccinea, Quercus falcata, Quercus ilicifolia, Quercus marilandica, Quercus rubra, Quercus shumardii, and Quercus velutina.
