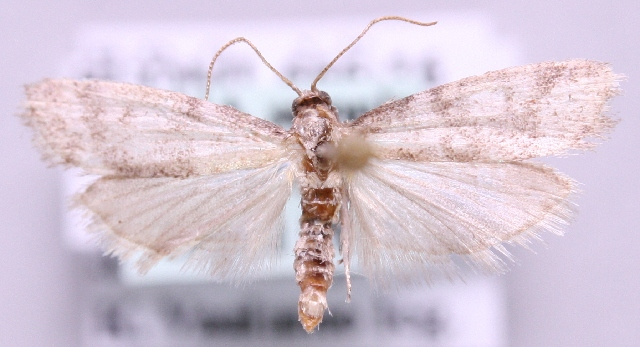

Scientific classification
- Kingdom: Animalia
- Phylum: Arthropoda
- Clade: Pancrustacea
- Class: Insecta
- Order: Lepidoptera
- Family: Pyralidae
- Genus: Vitula
- Species: V. biviella

Binomial name
- Vitula biviella (Zeller, 1848)

Synonyms
- Ephestia biviella Zeller, 1848

= Vitula biviella =

Species of moth

Vitula biviella is a species of snout moth in the genus Vitula. It was described by Zeller in 1848. It is found in most of Europe, except Ireland and the southern part of the Balkan Peninsula. It is only recently present in Great Britain. The first records were noted in 1997 and 1998 from Kent and the species now seems to have established small breeding populations in both Kent and Suffolk.

The wingspan is 12–18 mm. Adults are on wing from June to August.

The larvae feed on the flowers of Pinus species.
