= Vitula pinei =

Scientific classification
- Domain: Eukaryota
- Kingdom: Animalia
- Phylum: Arthropoda
- Class: Insecta
- Order: Lepidoptera
- Family: Pyralidae
- Genus: Vitula
- Species: V. pinei

Binomial name
- Vitula pinei Heinrich, 1956

Species of moth

Vitula pinei is a species of snout moth in the genus Vitula. It was described by Carl Heinrich in 1956. It is found in the US states of California, Arizona, Texas and Utah.

The wingspan is 19–21 mm. The forewings are white, finely dusted with fuscous. The hindwings are whitish and semihyaline with a smoky line along the termen and some smoky shading on the veins.

They feed on the cones Pinus species.
