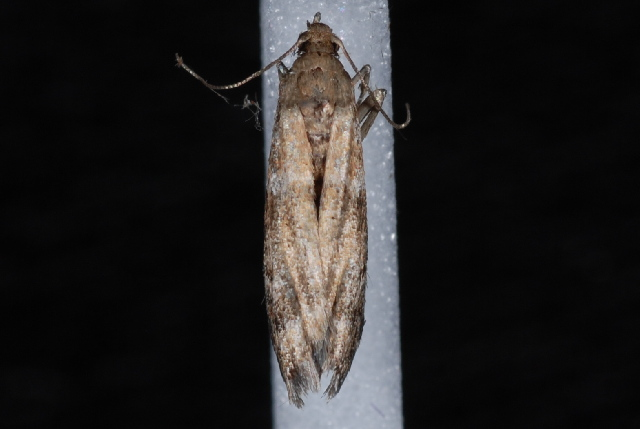

Scientific classification
- Domain: Eukaryota
- Kingdom: Animalia
- Phylum: Arthropoda
- Class: Insecta
- Order: Lepidoptera
- Family: Pyralidae
- Genus: Vitula
- Species: V. broweri

Binomial name
- Vitula broweri (Heinrich, 1956)

Synonyms
- Manhatta broweri Heinrich 1956

= Vitula broweri =

Species of moth

Vitula broweri, or Brower's vitula moth, is a species of snout moth in the genus Vitula. It was described by Carl Heinrich in 1956. It is found in much of North America, including British Columbia, Manitoba, Maryland, Massachusetts, Ohio, Oklahoma, Ontario, Tennessee, West Virginia and Wisconsin.

The wingspan is 14–16 mm. The forewings are pale brownish fuscous with a white-powdered area. The hindwings are pale fuscous and the veins and terminal margin are slightly darker.
