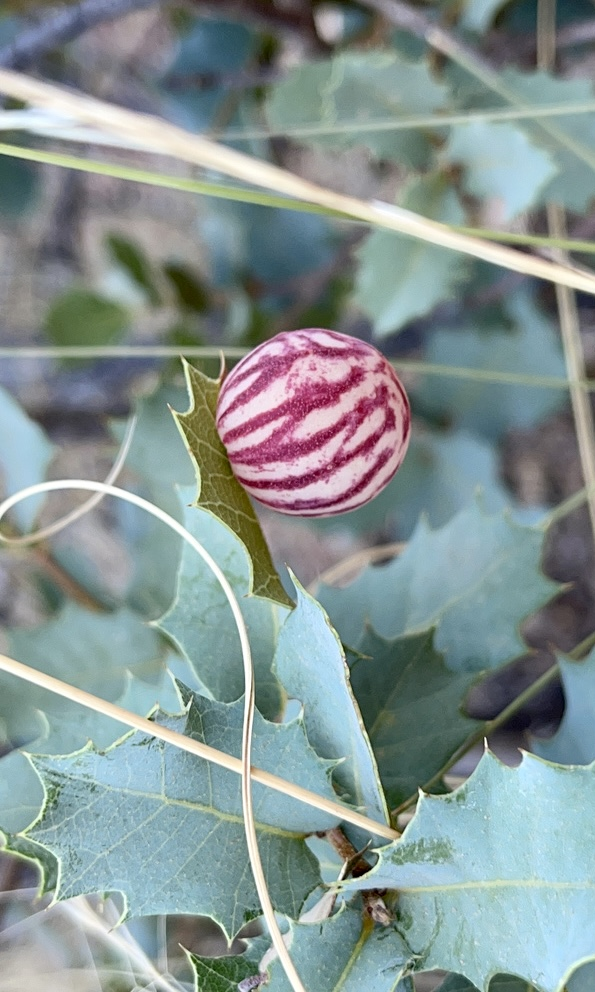
- Coconino National Forest, Sedona, Arizona, 2023

Scientific classification
- Kingdom: Animalia
- Phylum: Arthropoda
- Class: Insecta
- Order: Hymenoptera
- Family: Cynipidae
- Genus: Atrusca
- Species: A. capronae

Binomial name
- Atrusca capronae (Weld, 1930)

= Atrusca capronae =

North American gall-inducing wasp

Atrusca capronae, also known as the striped oak-apple gall wasp, is a fairly common species of cynipid wasp that produces galls on oak trees in North America. The wasp oviposits on shrub live oak leaves. The intensity of the stripe color may vary regionally. This wasp is most commonly observed in Arizona but is found elsewhere in southwestern North America where its host plant is present.

== See also ==
- Oak apple
