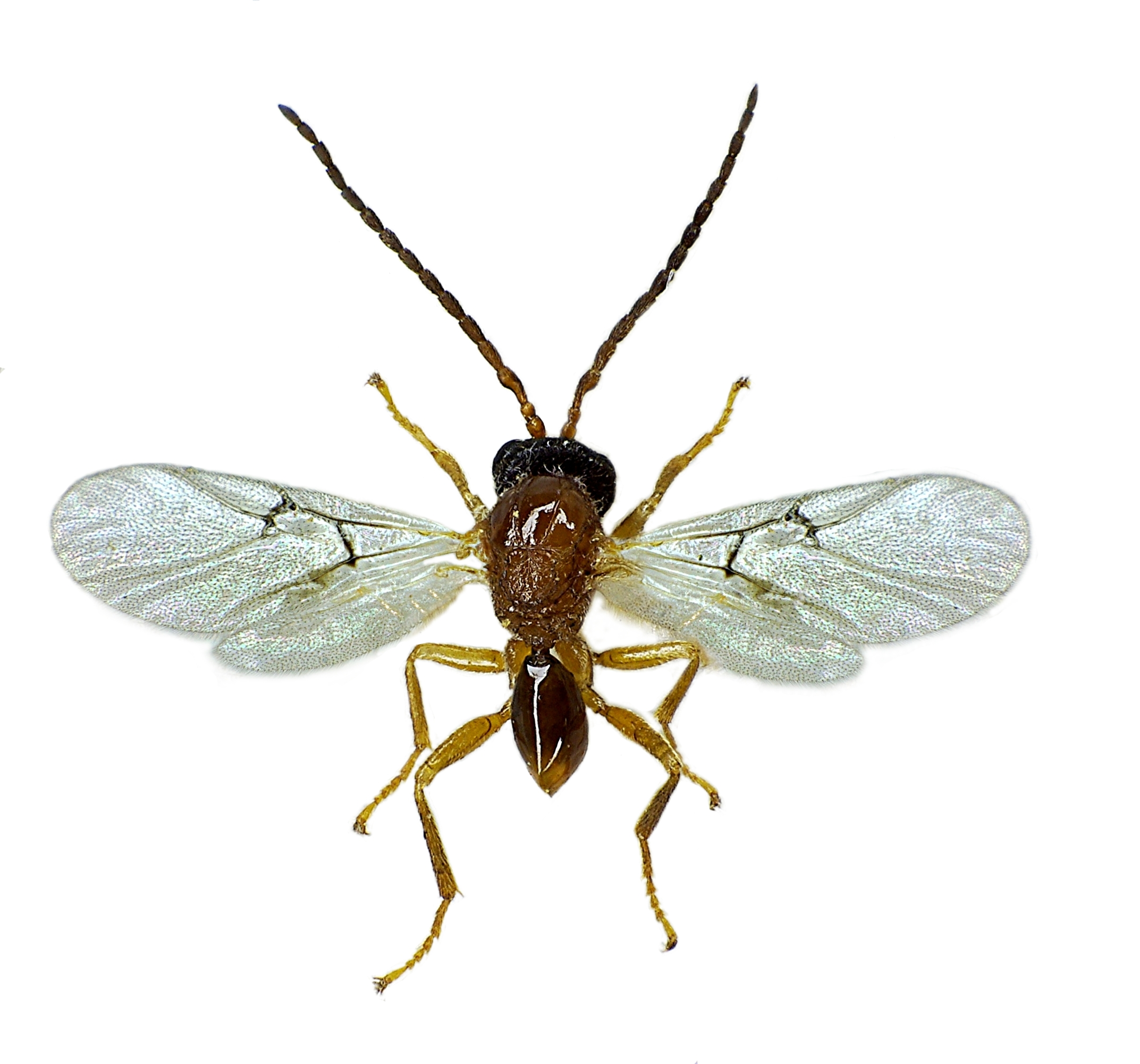
- Male Biorhiza pallida. The wings would be folded over the abdomen in life

Scientific classification
- Kingdom: Animalia
- Phylum: Arthropoda
- Class: Insecta
- Order: Hymenoptera
- Family: Cynipidae
- Genus: Biorhiza
- Species: B. pallida

Binomial name
- Biorhiza pallida Linnaeus, 1758

= Biorhiza pallida =

Species of wasp

Biorhiza pallida, also known as the oak apple gall wasp, is a gall wasp species in the family Cynipidae. This species is a member of the tribe Cynipini: the oak gall wasp tribe. Cynipini is the tribe partially responsible for the formation of galls known as oak apples on oak trees. These are formed after the wasp lays eggs inside the leaf buds and the plant tissues swell as the larvae of the gall wasp develop inside. This wasp has a widespread distribution within Europe.

== Description ==
Biorhiza pallida has a complex life cycle involving an agamic female that reproduces by parthenogenesis without a male during the winter/spring, and a summer generation of adults where individuals are either male or female. These mate and produce fertilised eggs.

The wingless agamic wasp is between 4.8 and 6.3 millimetres (0.19 and 0.25 in) long. The head is golden brown with mid-brown eyes and orange ocelli (simple eyes). The long antennae have fifteen segments and are orangeish-brown. The thorax, legs and bulbous, glistening gaster (abdomen) are yellowish-brown.

Male and female wasps that develop in the summer generation are smaller with a length between 2 and 3.5 mm (0.08 and 0.14 in). The head, thorax and gaster are golden brown and translucent. The clear wings have dark veins and pale brown hairs. The eyes are large and dark in the case of the female and pale in the male. The other main difference between the sexes is the gaster, which is deep and narrow in the male and broad and tipped with an ovipositor in the female.

== Life cycle ==
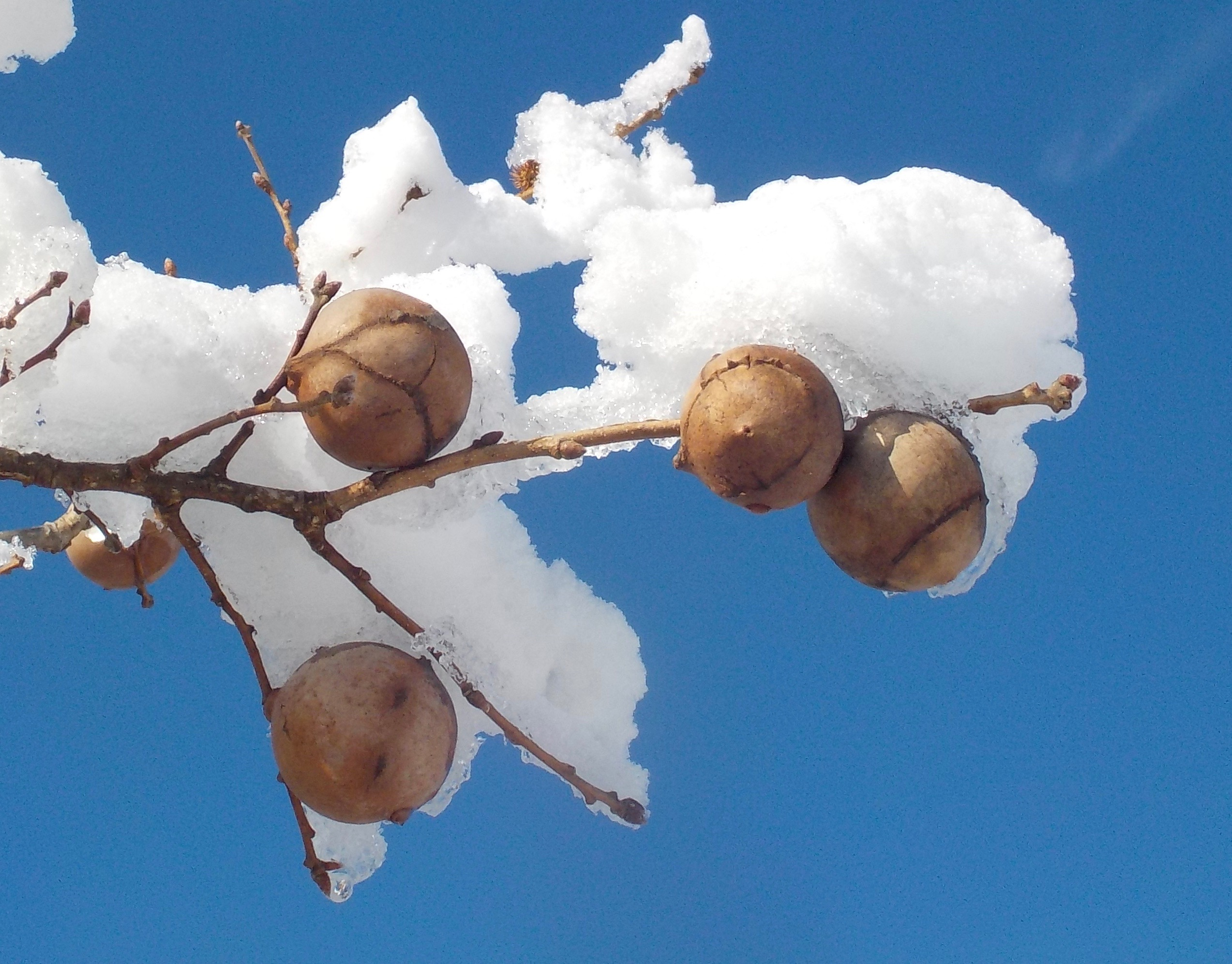
Overwintering galls

The winter-hatching generation of agamic females climb up the trunks of oak trees such as Quercus robur and Quercus petraea in the spring. They lay batches of eggs in the young buds of the oak, injecting venom at the same time. This causes the leaf tissues to swell and soften. The eggs hatch and the larvae secrete further substances that encourage plant growth and a globular gall is formed. Reaching as much as 5 cm (2 in) in diameter, it is soft and pudgy at first, but later becomes dry and papery. The gall provides a nutritious, protective environment and there may be as many as thirty larvae developing inside. Males and females emerge from different galls after two to three months. After mating, the females descend to the ground where they make their way into the soil and lay their eggs singly inside the small rootlets of the oak. Small globular galls appear on the roots and after overwintering as larvae, another generation of wingless agamic females emerge and crawl up the trunk.

Galls have been found on the following species of oak; Algerian oak (Quercus canariensis), Turkey oak (Quercus cerris), Portuguese oak (Quercus faginea), Hungarian oak (Quercus frainetto), holm oak (Quercus ilex), Aleppo oak (Quercus infectoria) & subsp. veneris, Lusitanian oak (Quercus lusitanica), sessile oak (Quercus petraea), downy oak (Quercus pubescens), Pyrenean oak (Quercus pyrenaica), pedunculate oak (Quercus robur) and cork oak Quercus suber.

== Ecology ==
As well as providing food and protection to the wasp larvae, the galls provide shelter for several inquiline species of gall wasp including Synergus gallaepomiformis and Synergus umbraculus. These share the tissues that provide food for the wasp larvae. About twenty other species of gall wasps are hyperparasites and live inside the gall and parasitise the rightful owners, the Biorhiza pallida larvae.

== Gallery ==
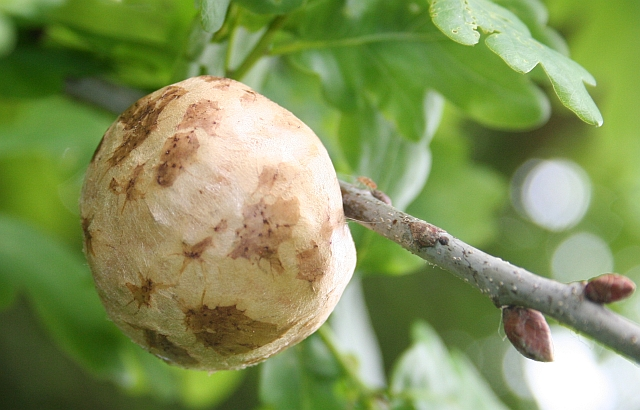
Oak apple gall

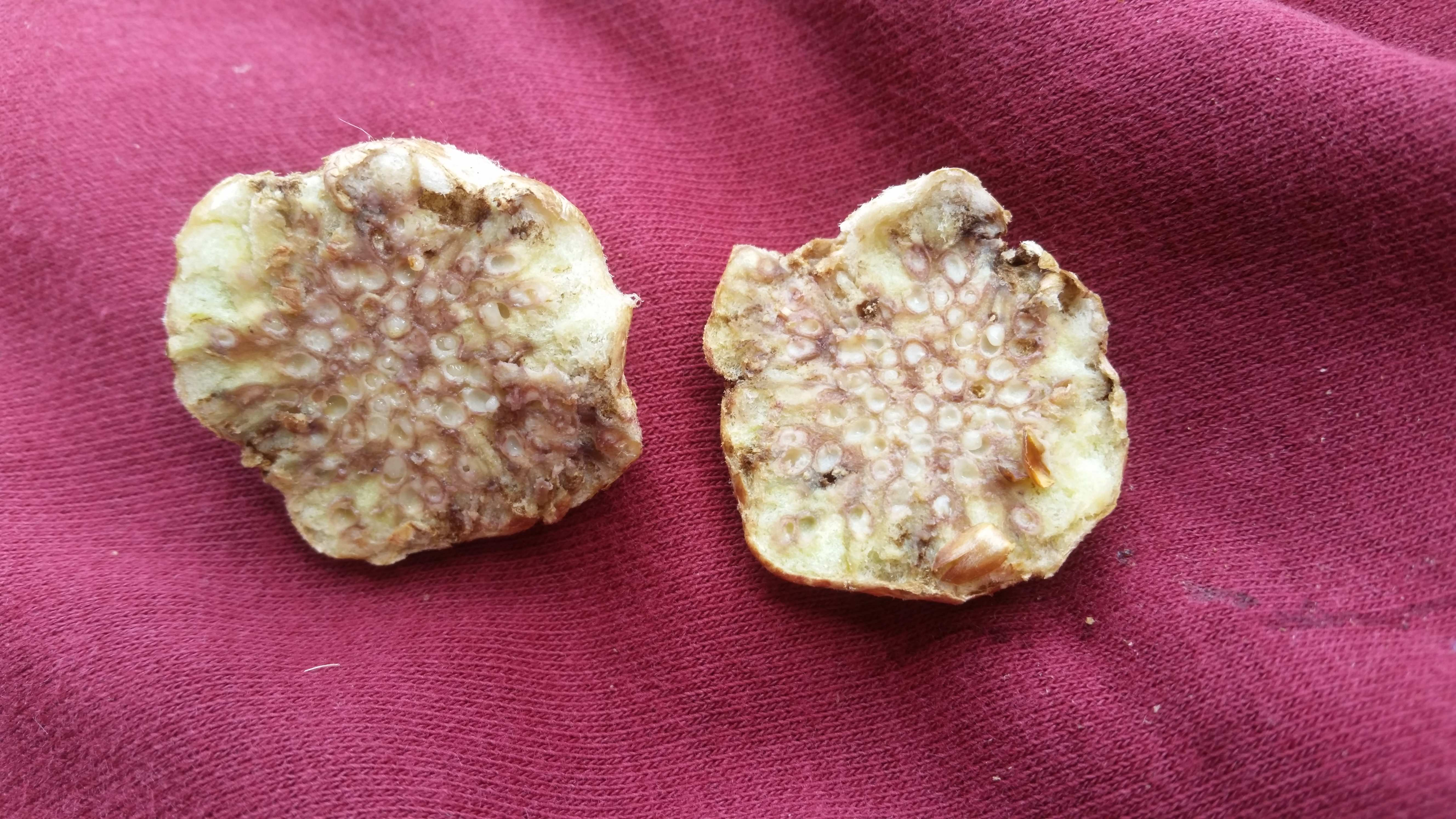
Gall cut in half

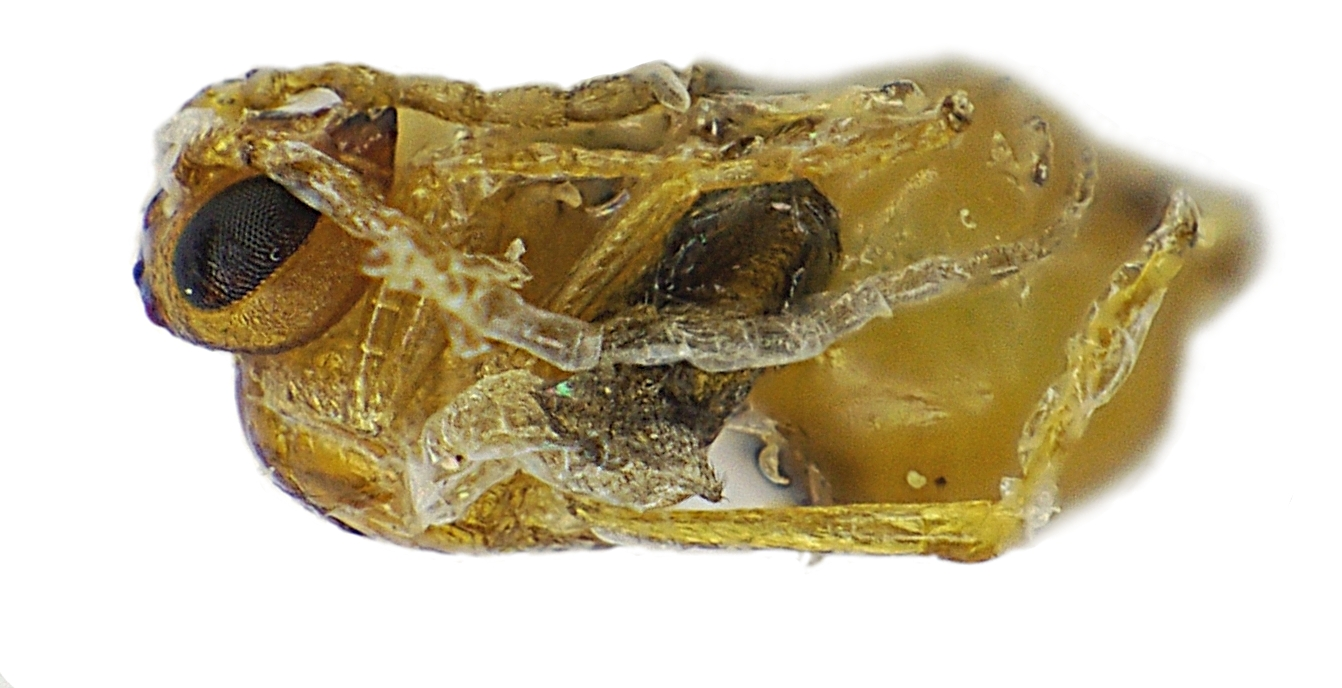
Pupa

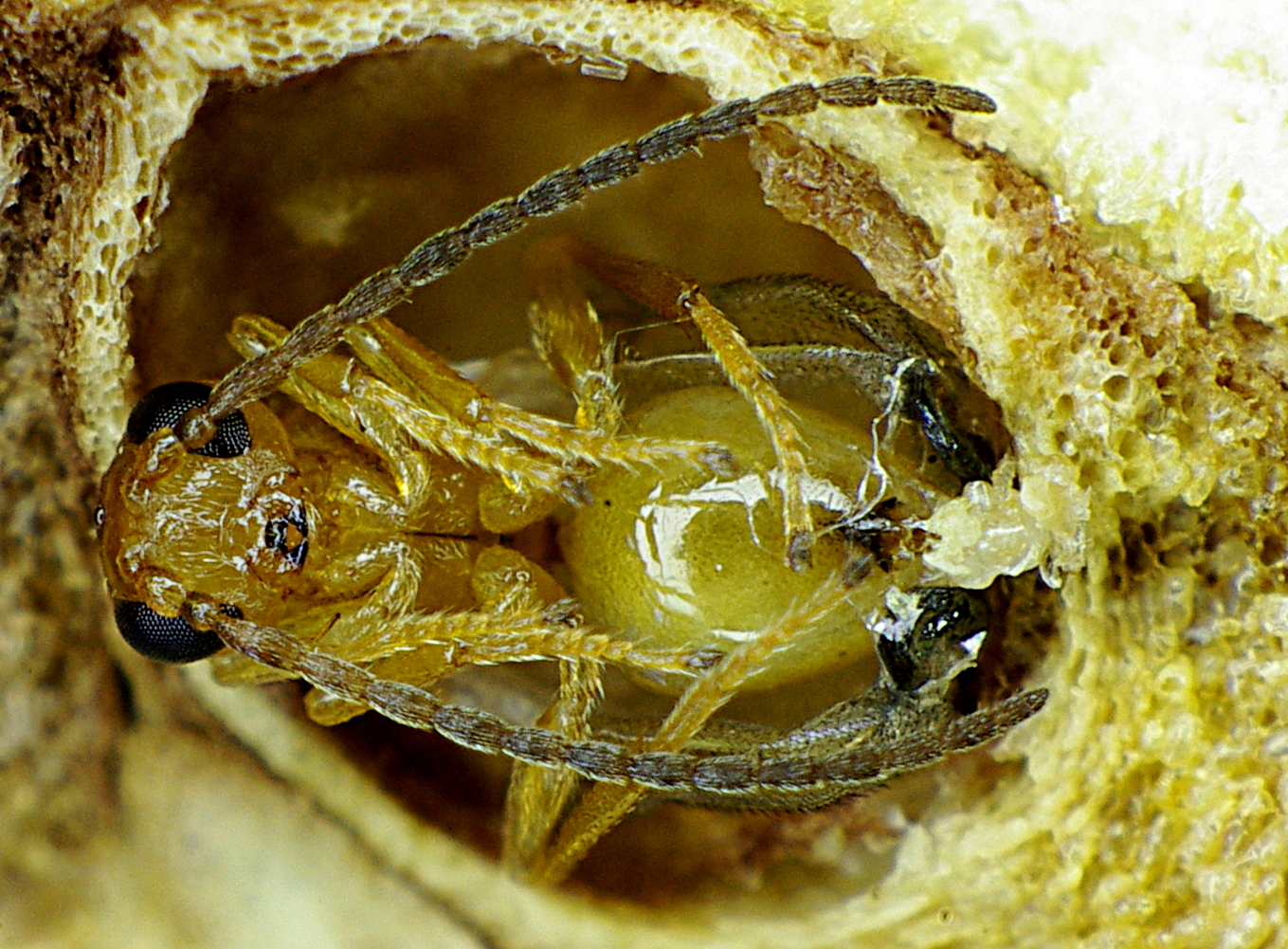
Wasp hatching

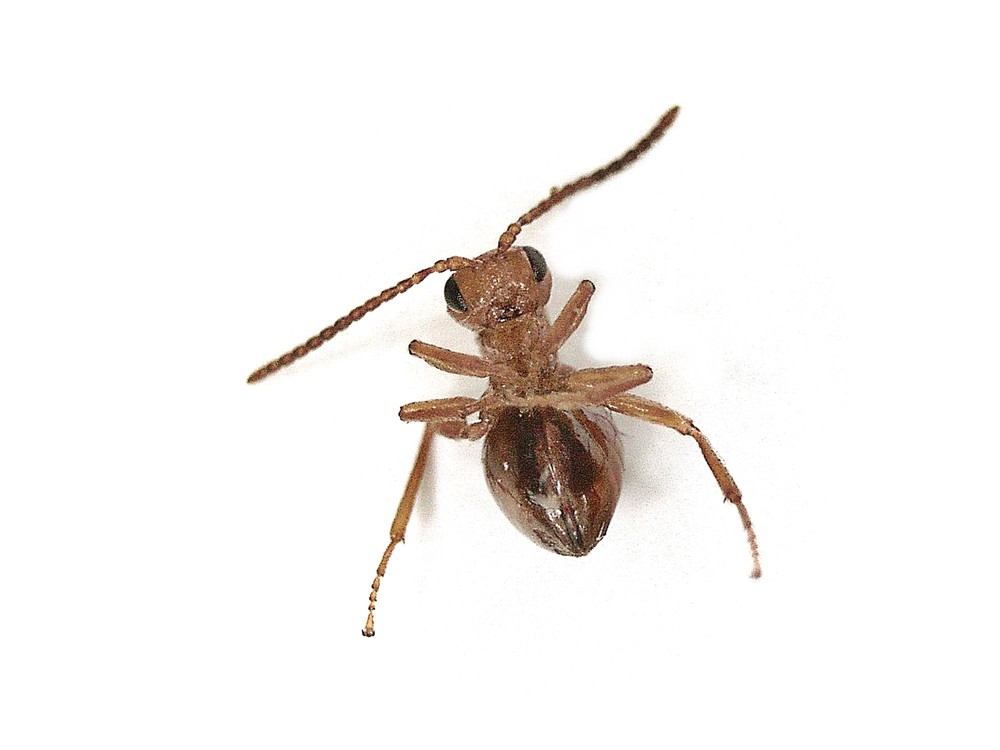
Female

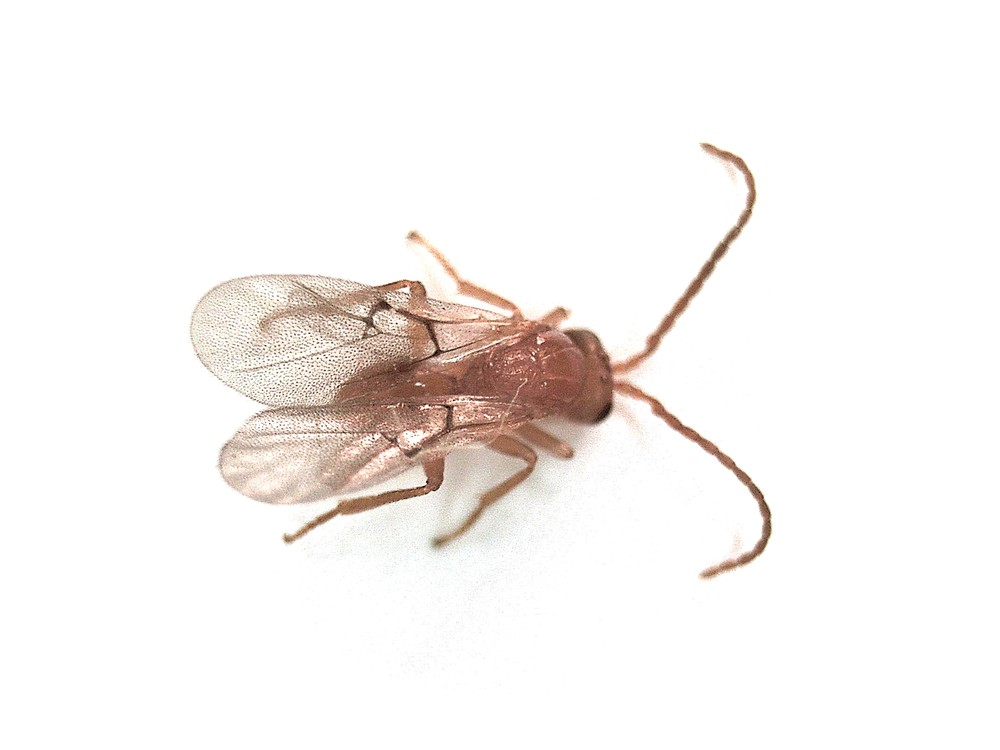
Male
