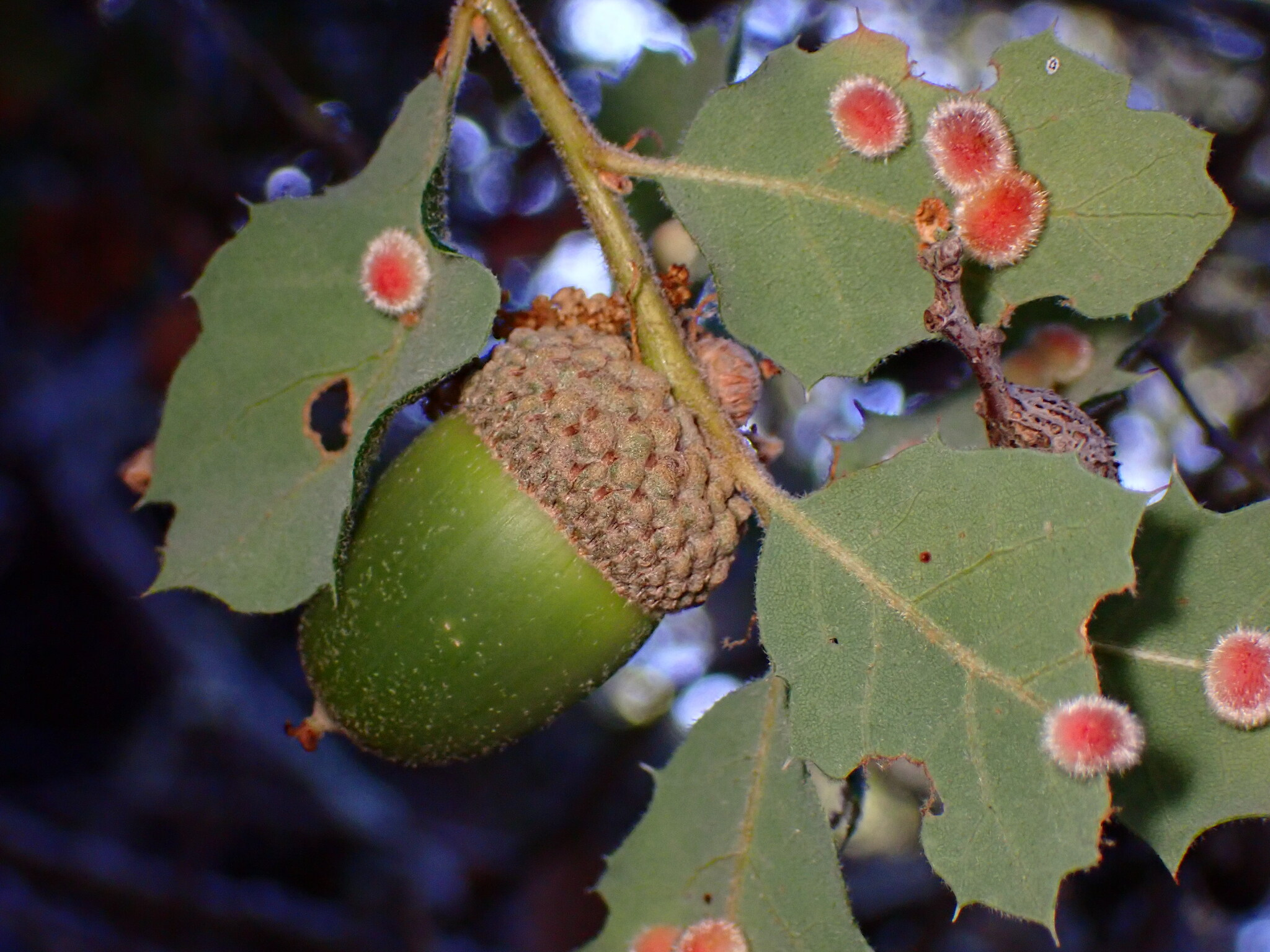

Scientific classification
- Kingdom: Animalia
- Phylum: Arthropoda
- Class: Insecta
- Order: Hymenoptera
- Family: Cynipidae
- Genus: Atrusca
- Species: A. trimaculosa

Binomial name
- Atrusca trimaculosa (McCracken & Egbert, 1922)

Synonyms
- Sphaeroteras trimaculosum

= Atrusca trimaculosa =

Species of wasp

Atrusca trimaculosa, also known as the woollybear gall wasp, is a species of gall wasp. This wasp is found on a variety of oak trees, including valley oak, blue oak, and Oregon oak. Its galls are 3–4 mm wide, round, and covered in stiff hairs. The galls are located on leaves, and often clustered together. Only females of this species are known.
