= Vitula divergens =

Scientific classification
- Kingdom: Animalia
- Phylum: Arthropoda
- Class: Insecta
- Order: Lepidoptera
- Family: Pyralidae
- Genus: Vitula
- Species: V. divergens

Binomial name
- Vitula divergens (Dyar, 1914)

Synonyms
- Ephestia divergens Dyar, 1914

Species of moth

Vitula divergens is a species of snout moth. It was described by Harrison Gray Dyar Jr. in 1914. It is found in Panama.
