= Vitula insula =

Scientific classification
- Domain: Eukaryota
- Kingdom: Animalia
- Phylum: Arthropoda
- Class: Insecta
- Order: Lepidoptera
- Family: Pyralidae
- Genus: Vitula
- Species: V. insula

Binomial name
- Vitula insula Neunzig, 1990

Species of moth

Vitula insula is a species of snout moth. It was described by Herbert H. Neunzig in 1990. It is found in the US state of California.
