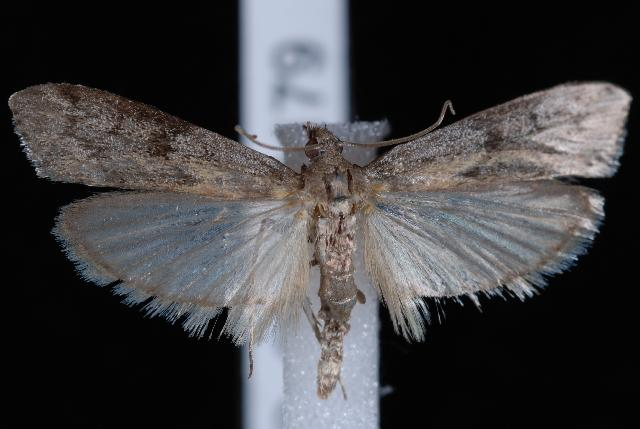
- Vitula edmandsii

Scientific classification
- Kingdom: Animalia
- Phylum: Arthropoda
- Clade: Pancrustacea
- Class: Insecta
- Order: Lepidoptera
- Family: Pyralidae
- Tribe: Phycitini
- Genus: Vitula; Ragonot, 1887

Synonyms
- Eccopsia Hulst, [1903]; Manhatta Hulst, 1890; Hornigia Ragonot, 1887 (preocc. Ragonot, 1885)

= Vitula =

Genus of moths

Vitula is a genus of snout moths. It was described by Émile Louis Ragonot in 1887.

== Species ==
- Vitula aegerella Neunzig, 1990
- Vitula biviella Zeller, 1848
- Vitula broweri (Heinrich, 1956)
- Vitula coconinoana Neunzig, 1990
- Vitula divergens (Dyar, 1914)
- Vitula edmandsii (Packard, 1864)
- Vitula inanimella (Dyar, 1919)
- Vitula insula Neunzig, 1990
- Vitula laura (Dyar, 1919)
- Vitula lugubrella (Ragonot, 1887)
- Vitula pinei Heinrich, 1956
- Vitula serratilineella (Ragonot, 1887)
- Vitula setonella (McDunnough, 1927)
