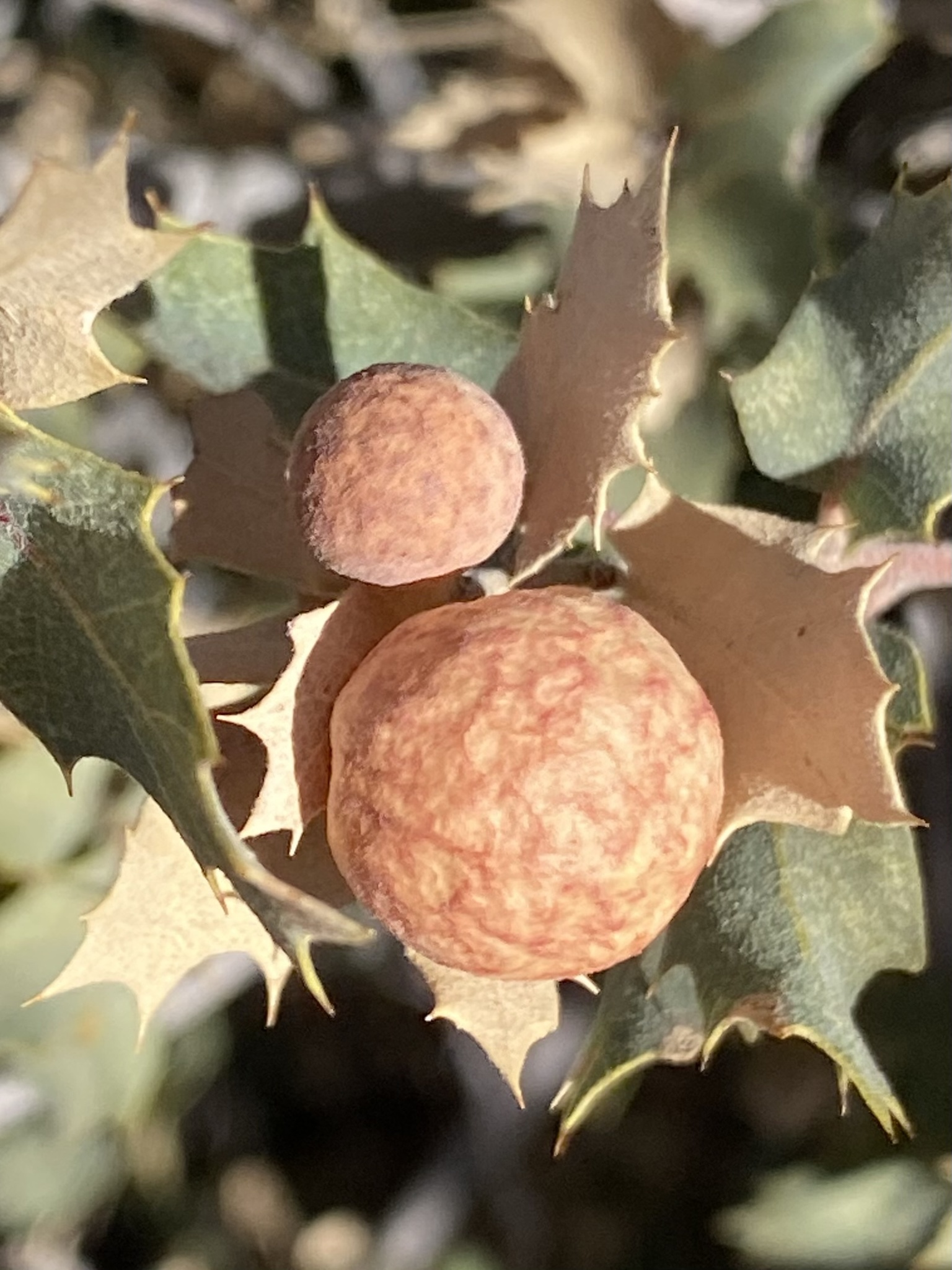
- Sandia Foothills Open Space, New Mexico, 2022

Scientific classification
- Kingdom: Animalia
- Phylum: Arthropoda
- Clade: Pancrustacea
- Class: Insecta
- Order: Hymenoptera
- Family: Cynipidae
- Genus: Atrusca
- Species: A. brevipennata

Binomial name
- Atrusca brevipennata (Kinsey, 1920)

Synonyms
- Andricus pellucidus

= Atrusca brevipennata =

North American gall-inducing wasp

Atrusca brevipennata, formerly Andricus pellucidus, also known as the little oak-apple gall wasp, is a locally common species of cynipid wasp that produces galls on oak trees in North America. The wasp oviposits on shrub live oak and Gambel oak leaves. The larval chamber is at the center of the gall, connected to the husk by slender, radiating fibers. This wasp is most commonly observed in the American Southwest, as far north as Denver. It is visually similar to, and may be confused with, Atrusca bella.

Atrusca brevipennata was first studied and introduced to the scientific community by American biologist and sexologist Alfred Kinsey.

== See also ==
- Oak apple
