= Oak apple =

Gall found on oak trees

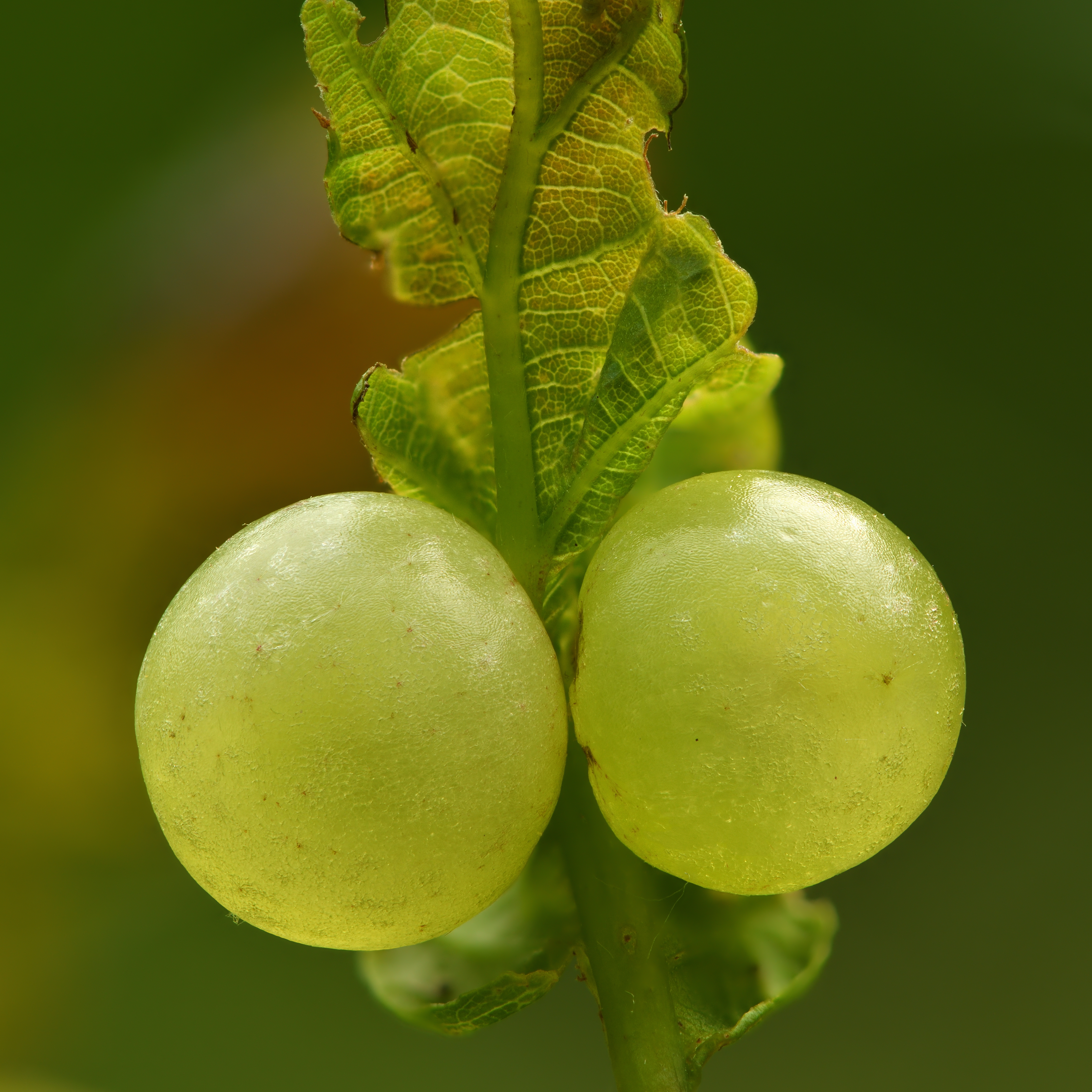
Oak apples on Quercus robur leaf

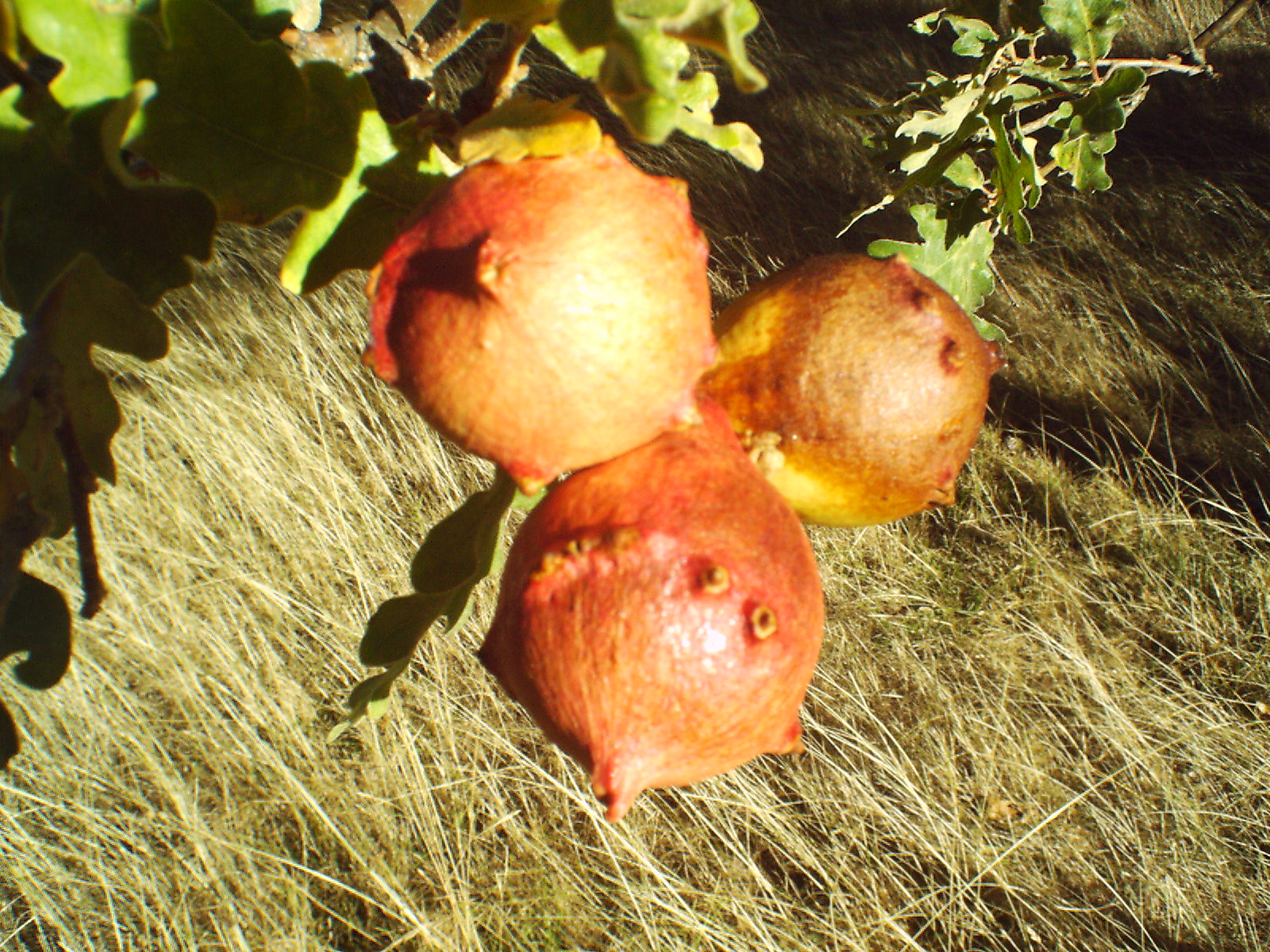
Oak galls on a Pyrenean oak (Quercus pyrenaica) in León, Spain.

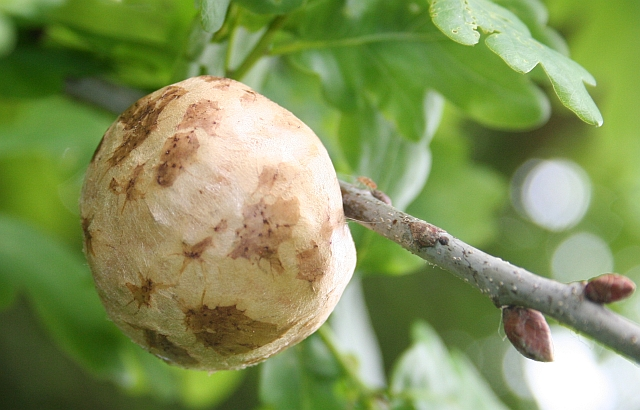
An oak apple on a tree in Worcestershire, England

An oak apple or oak gall is a large, round, vaguely apple-like gall commonly found on many species of oak. Oak apples range in size from 2 to 4 centimetres (1 to 2 in) in diameter and are caused by chemicals injected by the larva of certain kinds of gall wasp in the family Cynipidae.

== Formation ==
The adult female wasp lays single eggs in developing leaf buds. The wasp larvae feed on the gall tissue resulting from their secretions, which modify the oak bud into the gall, a structure that protects the developing larvae until they undergo metamorphosis into adults.

Some common oak-apple-forming species are the Biorhiza pallida gall wasp in Europe, Amphibolips confluenta in eastern North America, and Atrusca bella in western North America. Oak apples may be brownish, yellowish, greenish, pinkish, or reddish.

== Other galls ==
Considerable confusion exists in the general literature between the oak apple and the oak marble gall. The oak marble is frequently called the oak apple due to the superficial resemblance and the preponderance of the oak marble gall in the wild. Other galls found on oak trees include the oak artichoke gall and the acorn cup gall, but each of these has its own distinctive form.

== Iron gall ink ==
Oak galls have been used in the production of ink since at least the time of the Roman Empire. From the Middle Ages to the early twentieth century, iron gall ink was the main medium used for writing in the Western world.

Gall nuts are a source of tannin in the production of iron gall ink. Tannins belong to a group of molecules known as polyphenols and can be taken from different parts of plants such as leaves, pods, fruits, and gall nuts.

Along with gall nuts, other important ingredients in the production of iron gall ink include iron sulfate and gum arabic. The reaction between the tannins from the gall nut and the iron produces a complex that gives the iron gall ink its color. The gum arabic makes the ink more viscous and helps bind the ink to the writing surface.

== Folklore ==
In British and Irish folklore, it is said that if a "worm" is found inside the gall on Michaelmas Day, then the year will be pleasant and unexceptional, and if a spider is found, then it will be a bad year with shortages and ruined crops. If a fly is found inside, then it will be a moderate season, and if nothing is found, then serious diseases will occur all that year.

Oak Apple Day (or Royal Oak Day) is a former public holiday in England on 29 May that commemorated the Restoration of Charles II in 1660. The popular name refers to the event during the English Civil War when Charles hid in an oak tree. The commemoration persists in some areas today, although festivities have little to do with the Restoration.

== Gallery ==
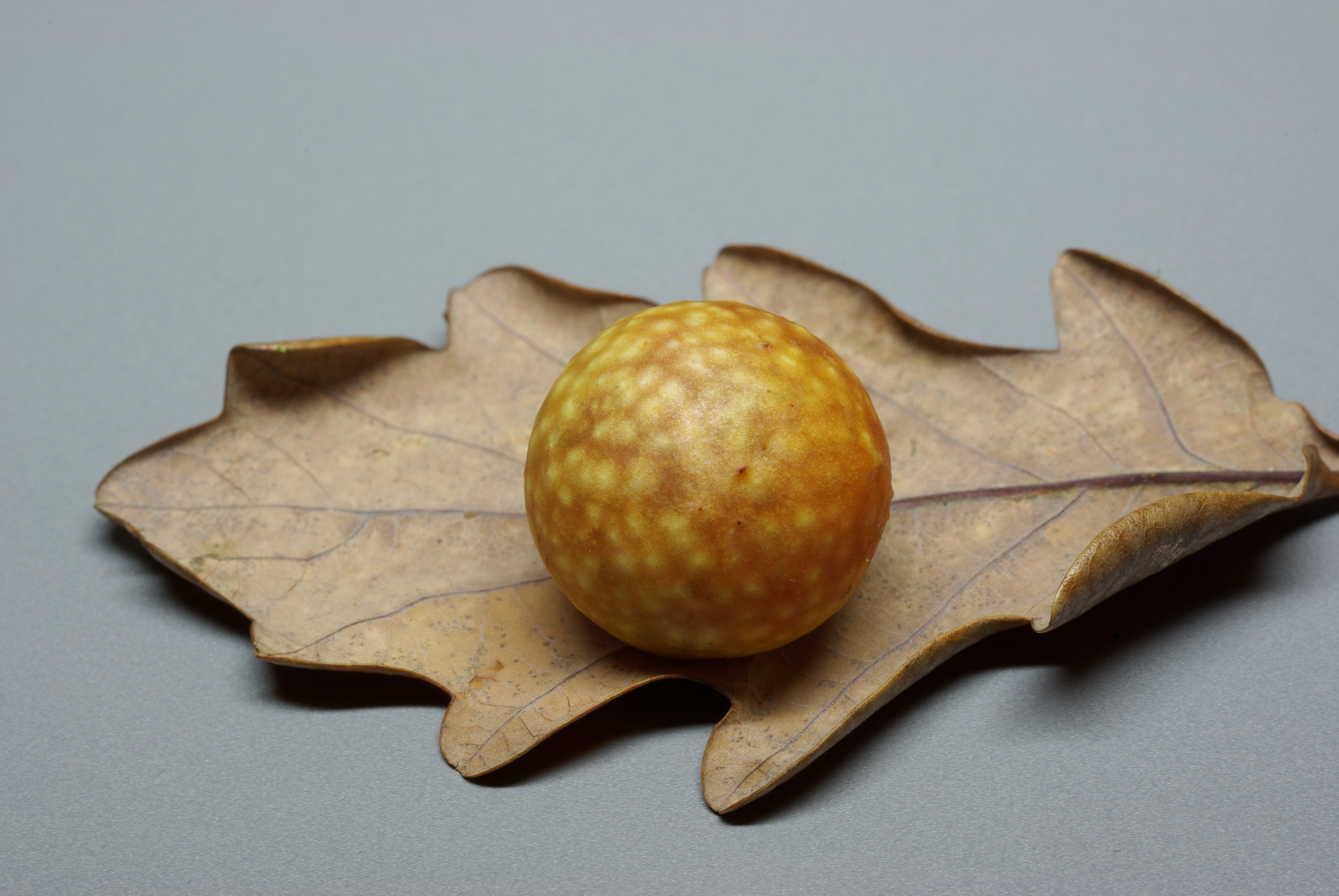
An oak apple on an oak leaf.

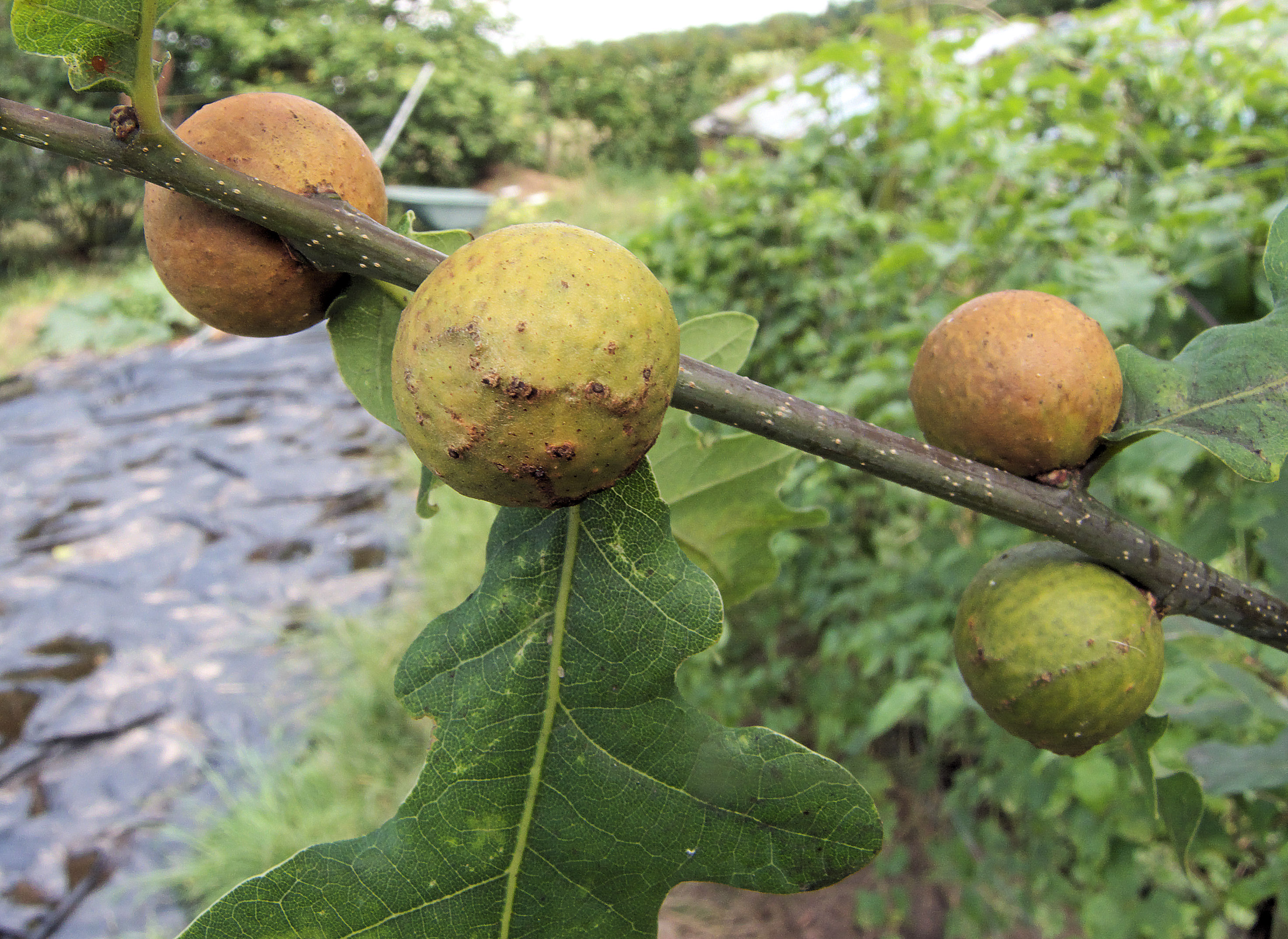
Oak apples

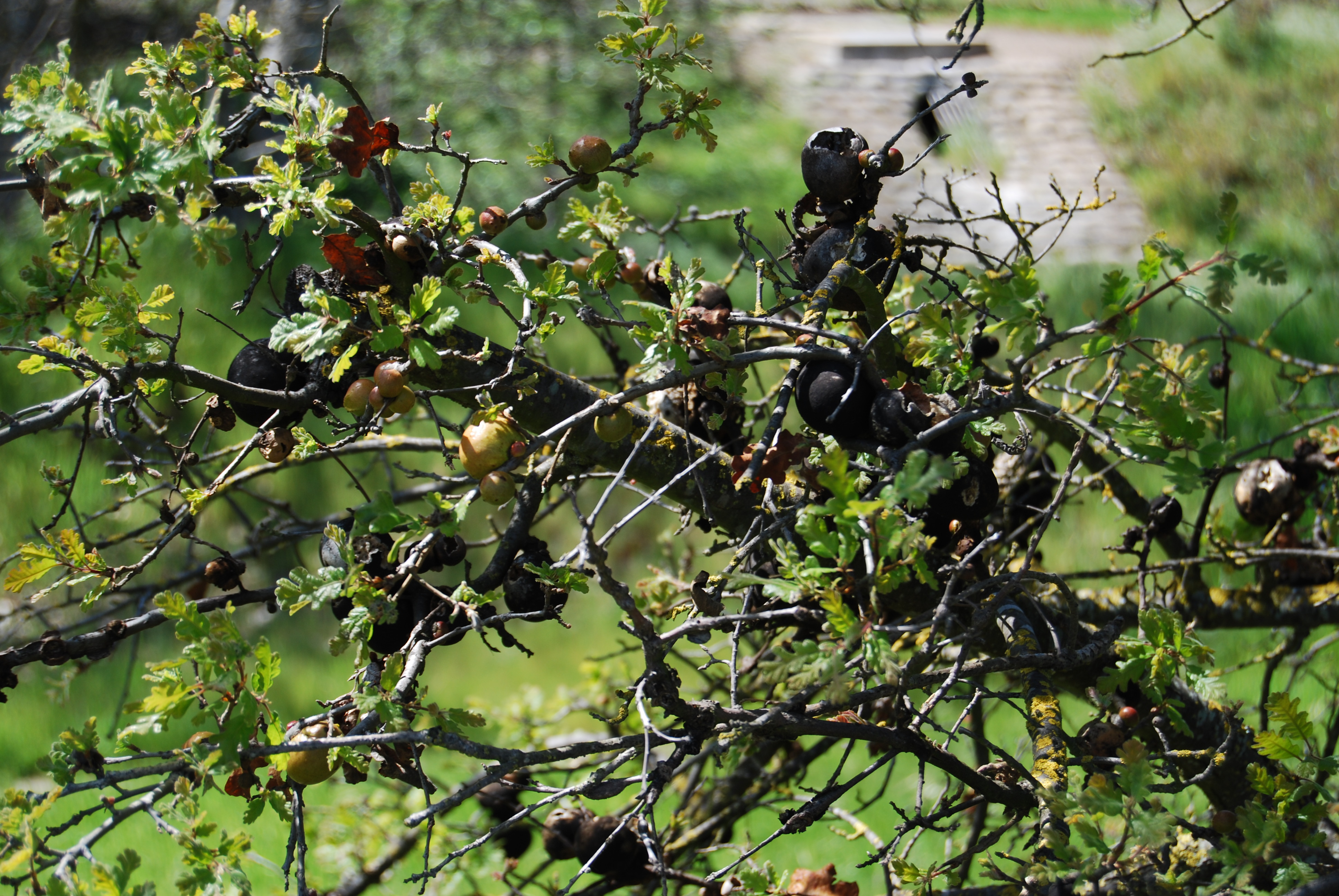
An oak tree with multiple oak apples.

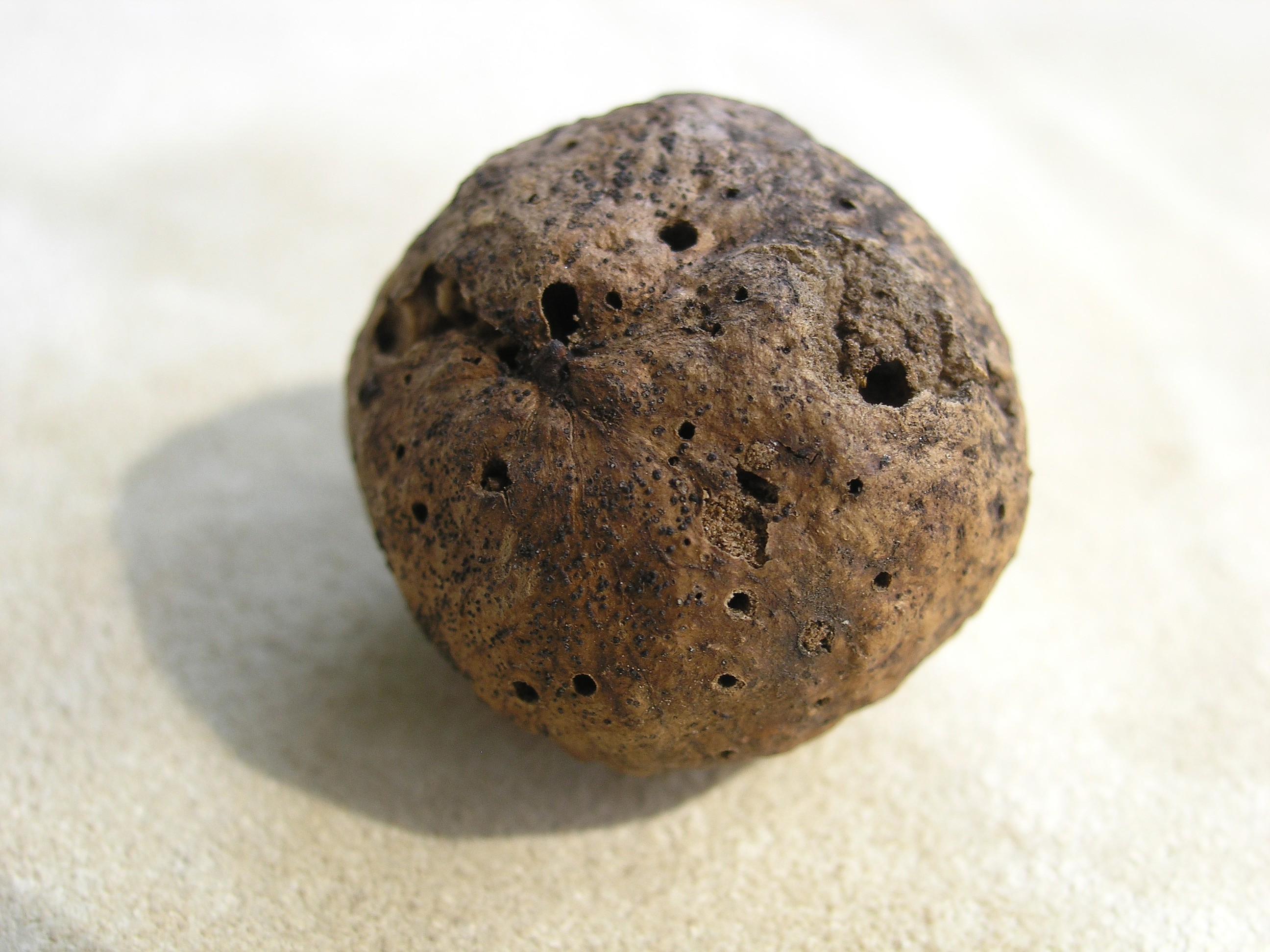
Andricus kollari oak gall

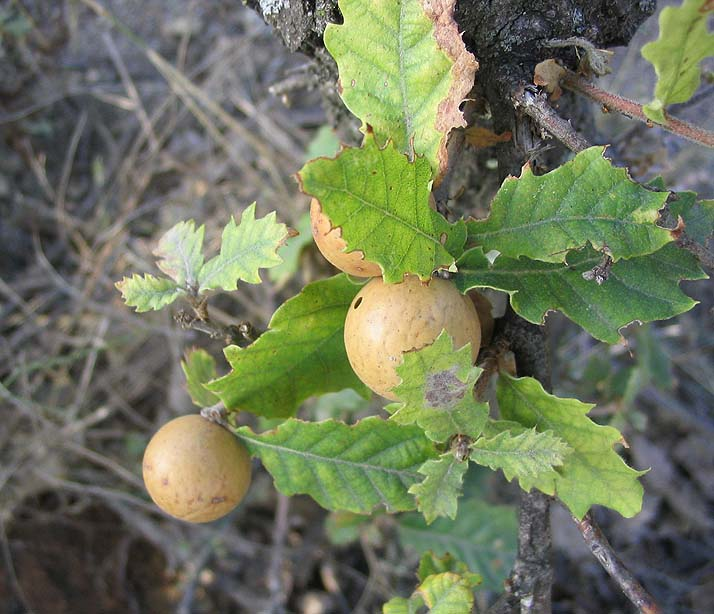
Oak apples on an oak tree.

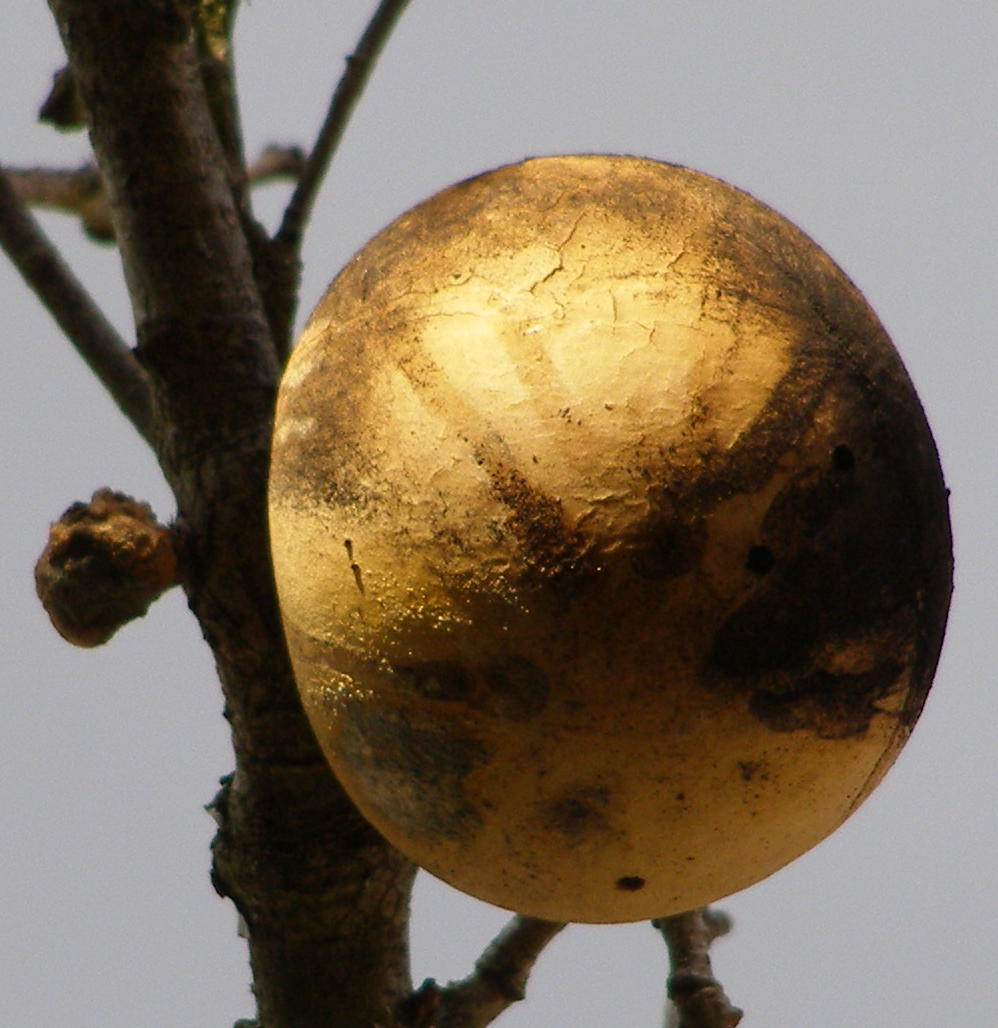
Oak apple gall on Garry oak (Quercus garryana)

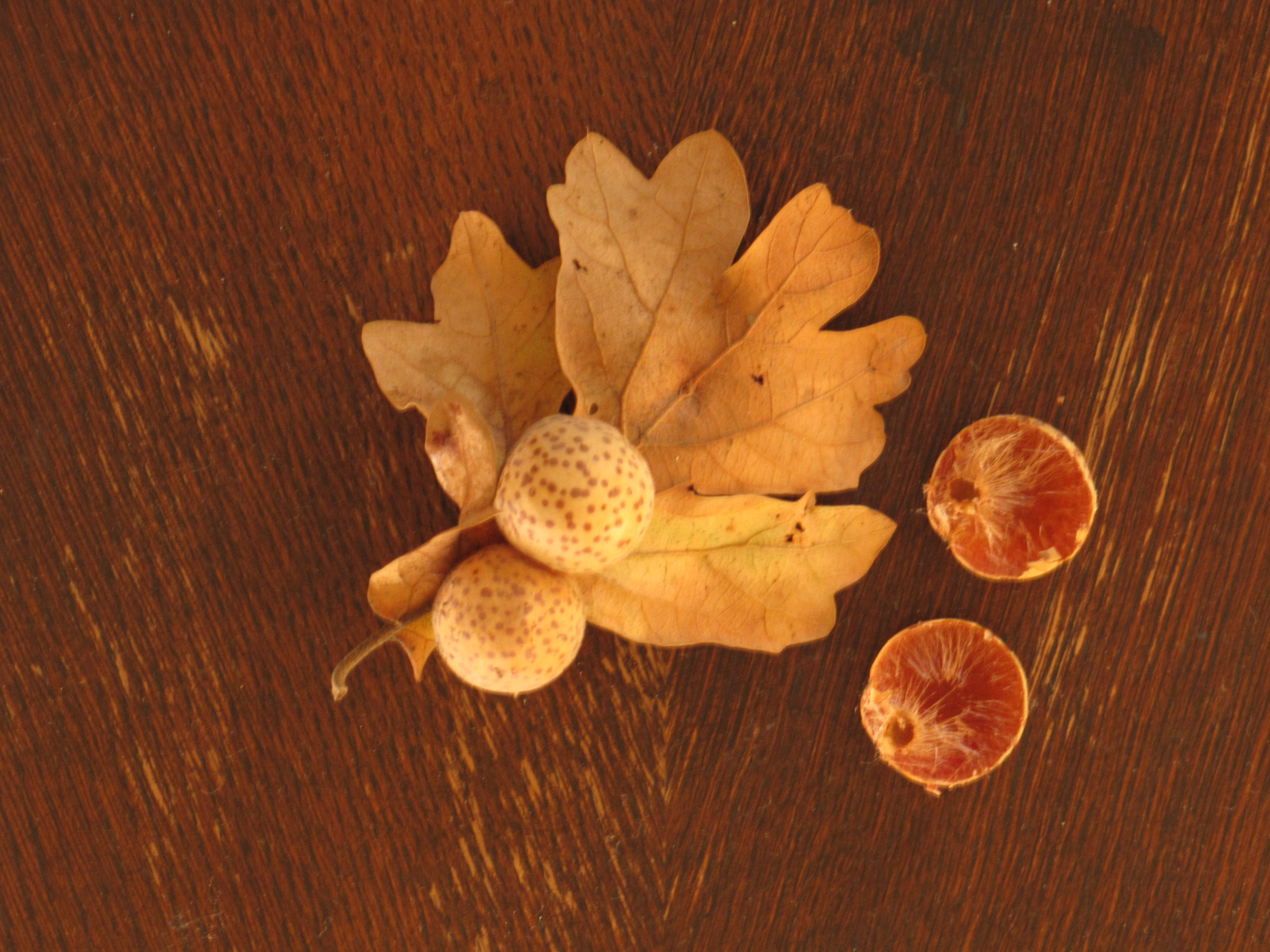
Oak apples on oak leaf and in cross section

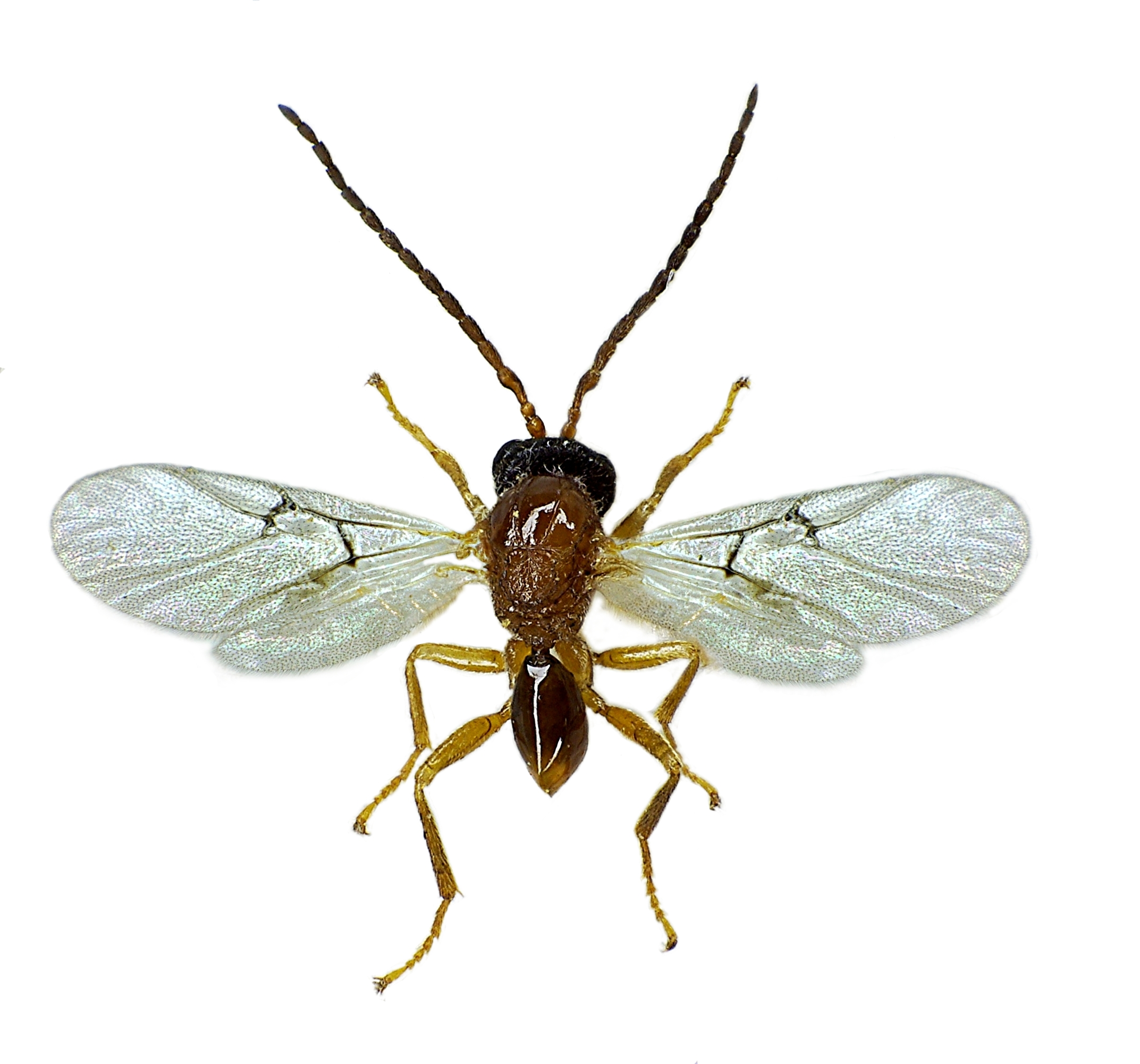
Biorhiza pallida male

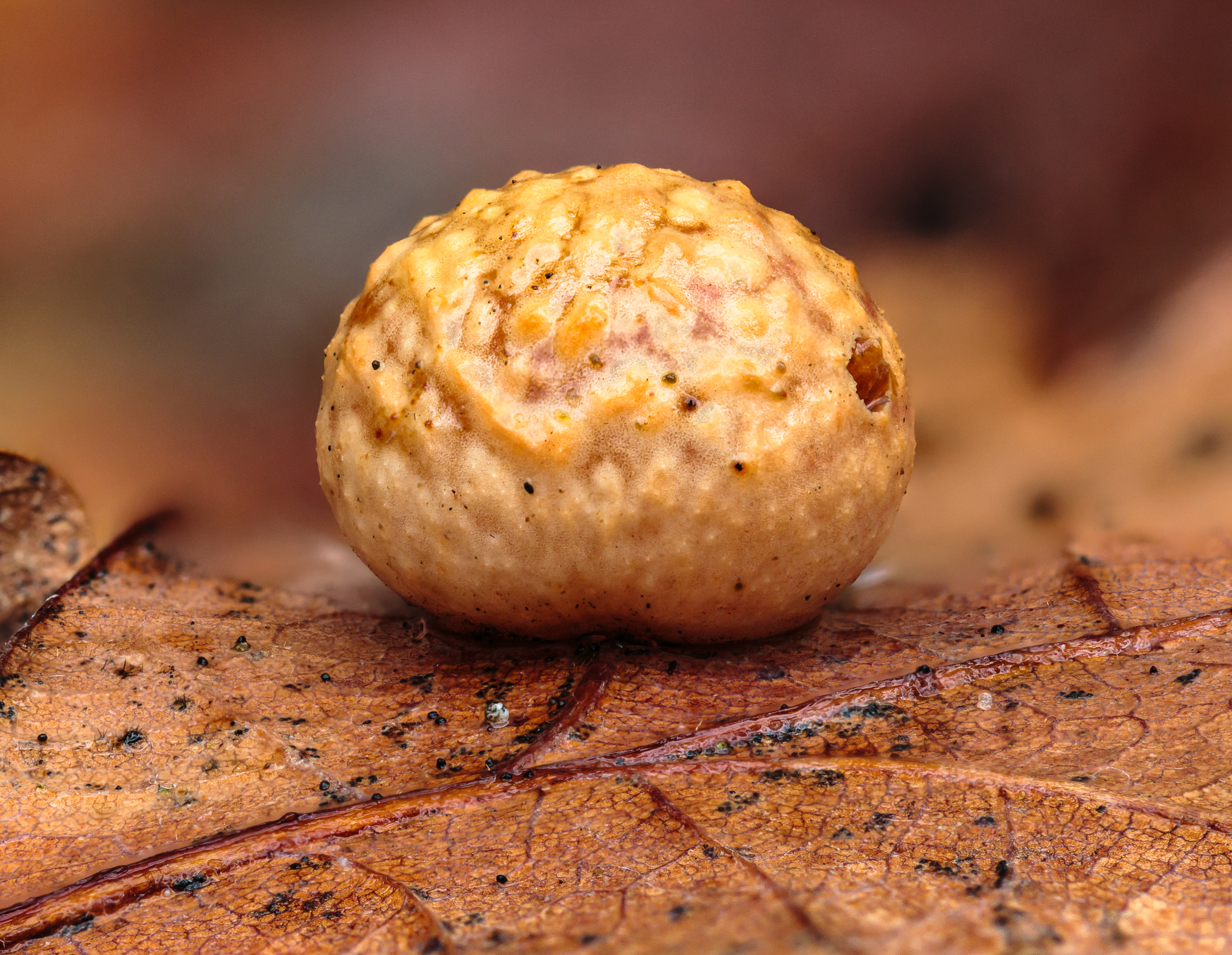
An oak leaf gall on the underside of an oak leaf.

== List of galls called oak apples ==
Oak apples
Image	Binomial name	Host species	Region
	Amphibolips confluenta	various	North America
	Amphibolips quercuspomiformis	coast live oak, interior live oak	North America
	Andricus quercuscalifornicus	valley oak, California scrub oak	North America
	Atrusca bella	Arizona white oak, Mexican blue oak, netleaf oak, Toumey oak, and shrub live oak	North America
	Atrusca brevipennata	shrub live oak, Gambel oak	North America
	Atrusca capronae	shrub live oak	North America
	Besbicus mirabilis	Oregon oak	North America
	Biorhiza pallida	English oak, sessile oak	Europe
	Trichoteras coquilletti	Huckleberry oak, canyon live oak	North America
	Trichoteras vacciniifoliae	Huckleberry oak, canyon live oak	North America

== See also ==
- Knopper gall
- Pineapple gall
