= Vitula setonella =

Scientific classification
- Kingdom: Animalia
- Phylum: Arthropoda
- Class: Insecta
- Order: Lepidoptera
- Family: Pyralidae
- Genus: Vitula
- Species: V. setonella

Binomial name
- Vitula setonella (McDunnough, 1927)

Synonyms
- Moodna setonella McDunnough, 1927; Manhatta setonella

Species of moth

Vitula setonella is a species of snout moth in the genus Vitula. It was described by James Halliday McDunnough in 1927. It is found in British Columbia, Utah, California and Arizona.

The wingspan is 14–16 mm.
