= Vitula laura =

Scientific classification
- Kingdom: Animalia
- Phylum: Arthropoda
- Class: Insecta
- Order: Lepidoptera
- Family: Pyralidae
- Genus: Vitula
- Species: V. laura

Binomial name
- Vitula laura (Dyar, 1919)

Synonyms
- Euzophera laura Dyar, 1919

Species of moth

Vitula laura is a species of snout moth in the genus Vitula. It was described by Harrison Gray Dyar Jr. in 1919. It is found in Guatemala.

The wingspan is about 20 mm. The forewings are dark purplish gray and the costal area is white. The hindwings are glossy smoky brown, but the veins and terminal margin are darker.
