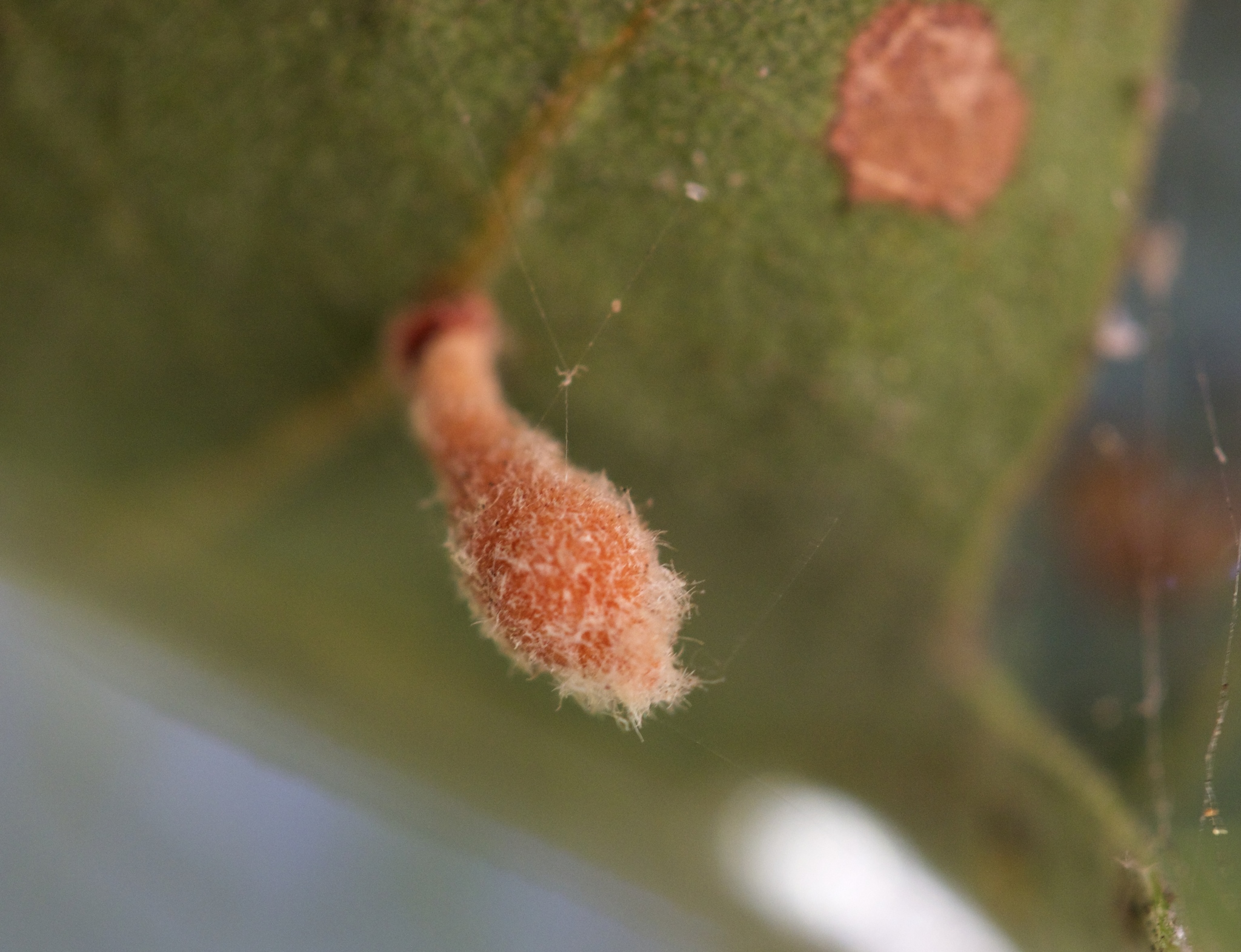
- Leaf gall caused by Atrusca clavuloides

Scientific classification
- Kingdom: Animalia
- Phylum: Arthropoda
- Class: Insecta
- Order: Hymenoptera
- Family: Cynipidae
- Tribe: Cynipini
- Genus: Atrusca; Kinsey, 1930

Type species
- Cynips (Atrusca) dugesi var. simulatrix Kinsey, 1930

= Atrusca =

Genus of wasps

Atrusca is a genus of gall wasps in the family Cynipidae. It consists of approximately 50 species, and is found in North and Central America.

== Species ==
Selected species:

- Atrusca bella
- Atrusca brevipennata
- Atrusca capronae
- Atrusca clavuloides
- Atrusca trimaculosa

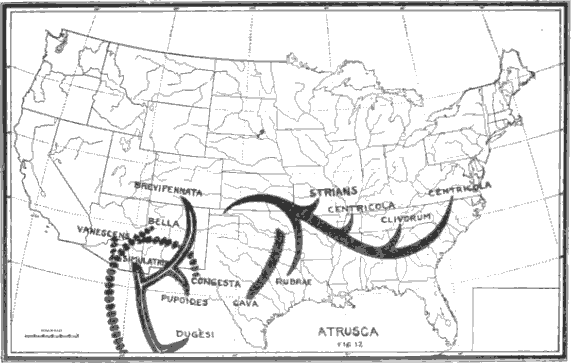
"Phylogenetic origins in Atrusca" from The Gall Wasp Genus Cynips by Alfred Kinsey, p.72. Fig. 12
