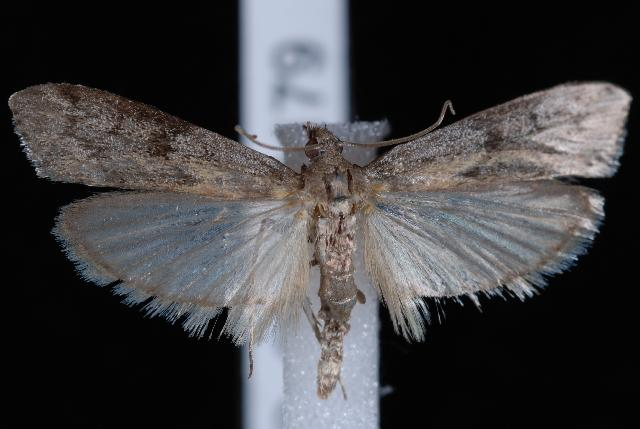
- Vitula serratilineella in source as "Vitula edmandsii serratilineella"

Scientific classification
- Kingdom: Animalia
- Phylum: Arthropoda
- Clade: Pancrustacea
- Class: Insecta
- Order: Lepidoptera
- Family: Pyralidae
- Genus: Vitula
- Species: V. serratilineella

Binomial name
- Vitula serratilineella (Ragonot, 1887)

Synonyms
- Moodna bombylicolella Amsel, 1955

= Vitula serratilineella =

Species of moth

Vitula serratilineella, the beehive honey moth, is a species of snout moth in the genus Vitula.

It was described by Émile Louis Ragonot in 1887 without specific original locality but in a work on various North American taxa. Subsequently, the species has records from the Pacific Northwest (i.e. British Columbia, Oregon, Washington) and throughout California. However, it is also known from Europe, being found in Germany, Denmark and Fennoscandia, plus occasionally from nearby countries such as Great Britain.

In the past, the beehive honey moth has either been treated as a full species or as a subspecies Vitula edmandsii serratilineella, of Vitula edmandsii (Packard, 1865). Older lists may have records [including many for Europe] under those other names. Further possible confusion of identities can involve use of the common names dried-fruit moth or dried fruit moth, which share usage with Cadra calidella, another "dried fruit moth".

The wingspan is 20–25 mm. It is a pest of stored raisins, prunes, dried apple and other dried fruit product. It is distinguished from several other similar pest moths of the area by lighter colored forewings and nearly white (not brownish) hindwings. Like with Vitula edmandsii it may invade beehives and is known to feed on wax inside bumble bee nests.

== Gallery ==
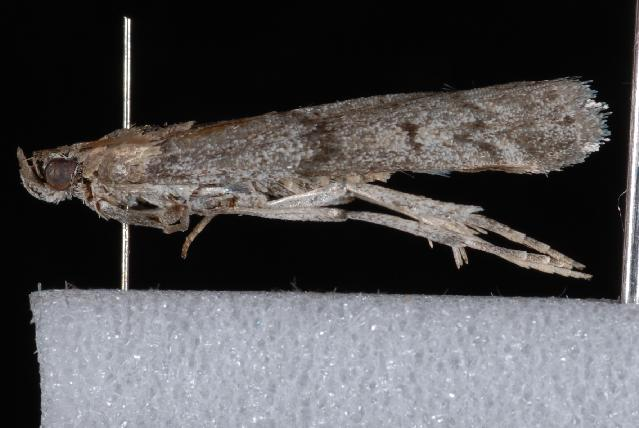
as Vitula edmandsii serratilineella
