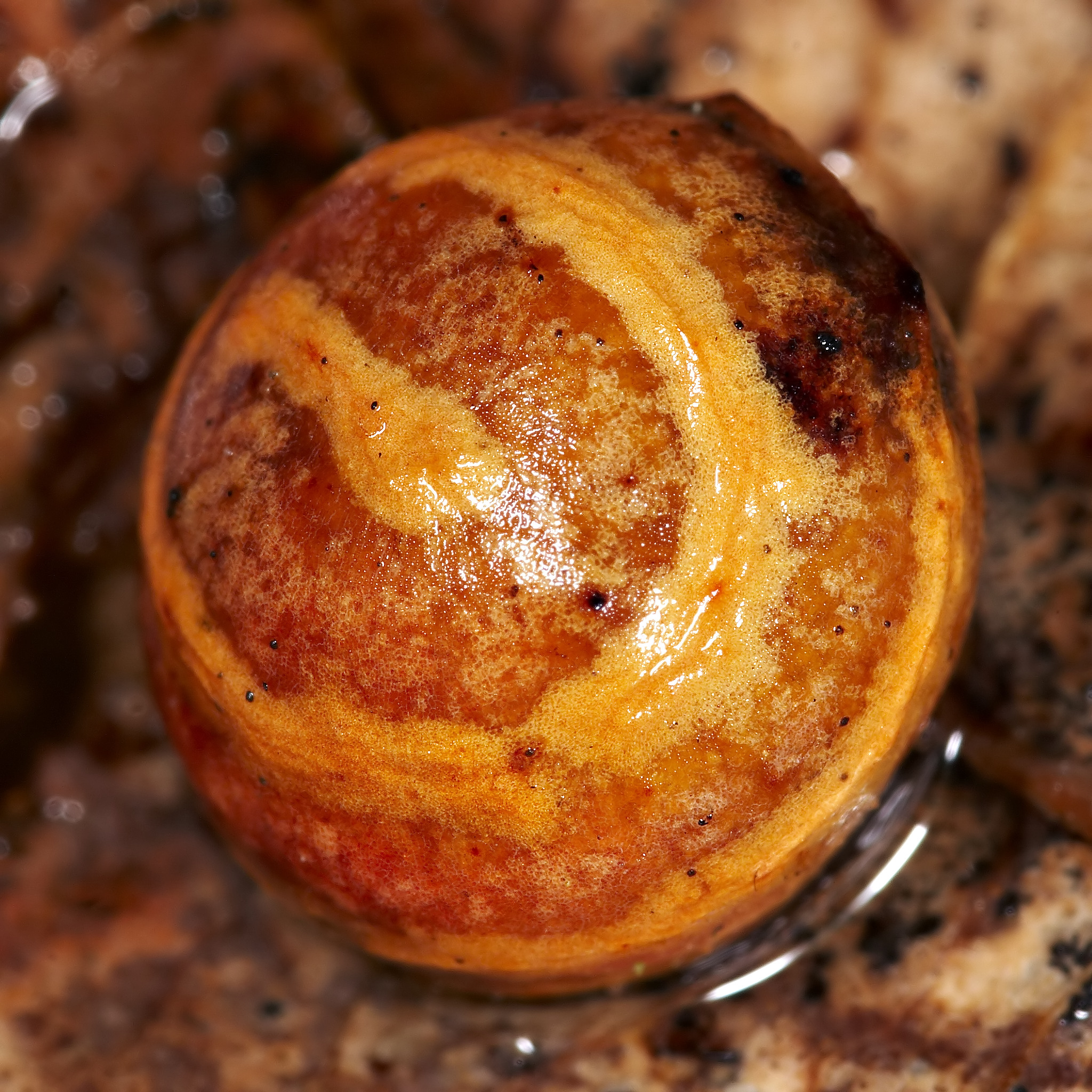
- Cynips longiventris parthenogenetic generation gall

Scientific classification
- Kingdom: Animalia
- Phylum: Arthropoda
- Class: Insecta
- Order: Hymenoptera
- Family: Cynipidae
- Tribe: Cynipini
- Genus: Cynips; Linnaeus, 1758

Species
- about 39, see text

Synonyms
- Besbicus Kinsey, 1930; Dryophanta Forster, 1869

= Cynips =

Genus of wasps

Cynips is a genus of gall wasps in the tribe Cynipini, the oak gall wasps. One of the best known is the common oak gall wasp (Cynips quercusfolii), which induces characteristic spherical galls about two centimeters wide on the undersides of oak leaves.

As of 2008, there are about 39 species in this genus.

Some authors have included Antron in Cynips but it was recently resurrected as a distinct genus.

== Species ==
- Cynips agama
- Cynips conspicua – fuzzy gall wasp
- Cynips cornifex
- Cynips disticha
- Cynips divisa – red-pea gall
- Cynips douglasii – spined turbaned gall wasp
- Cynips fusca
- Cynips izzetbaysali
- Cynips longiventris
- Cynips mirabilis – speckled gall wasp
- Cynips multipunctata – gray midrib gall wasp
- Cynips quercusechinus – urchin gall wasp
- Cynips quercusfolii
- Cynips schlechtendali

== Former species ==
The wasp formerly named Cynips saltatorius is now named Neuroterus saltatorius.
