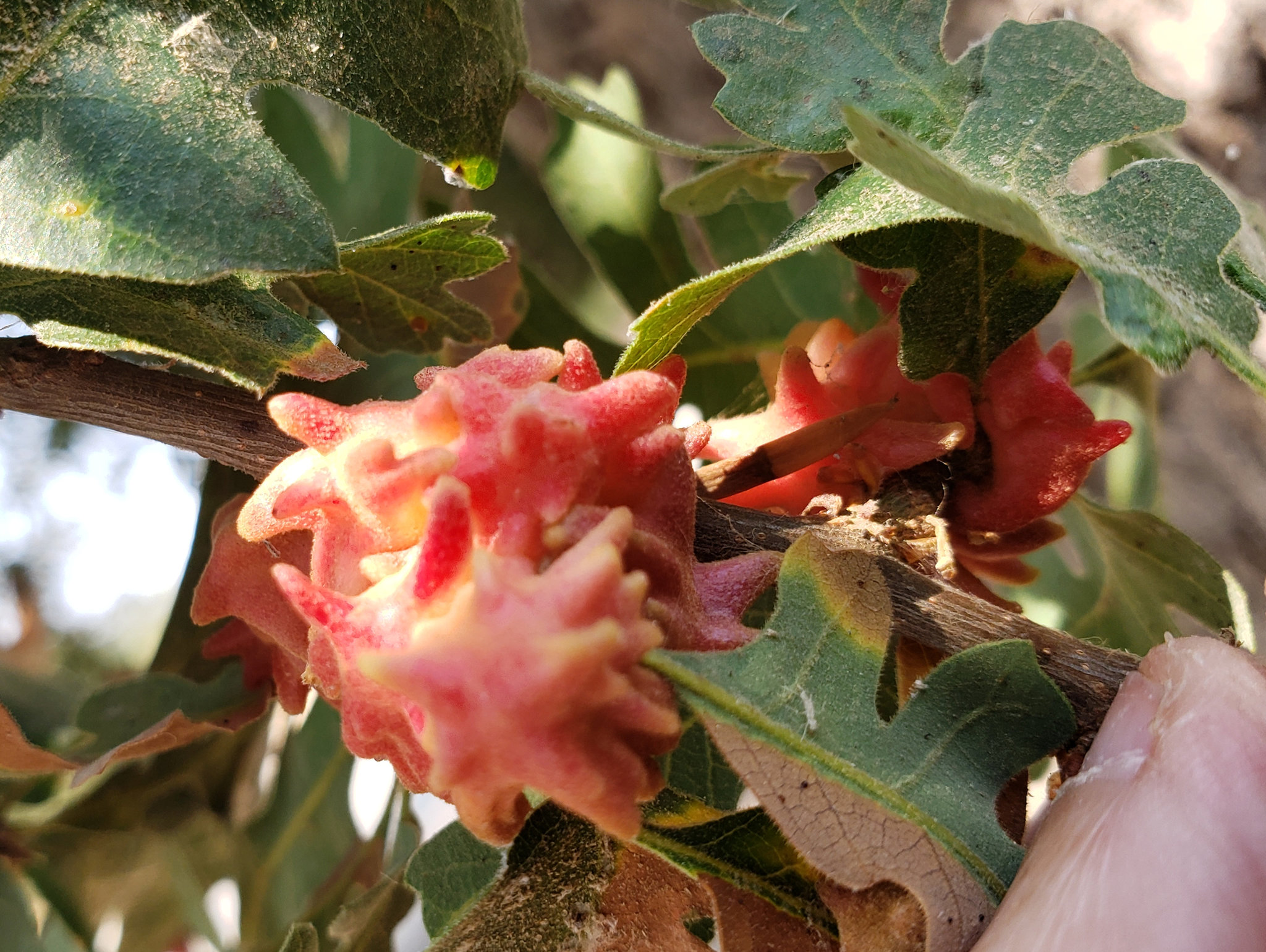
- Yolo County, California, 2021

Scientific classification
- Kingdom: Animalia
- Phylum: Arthropoda
- Class: Insecta
- Order: Hymenoptera
- Family: Cynipidae
- Genus: Besbicus
- Species: B. heldae

Binomial name
- Besbicus heldae (Kinsey, 1929)

Synonyms
- Cynips heldae

= Besbicus heldae =

North American gall-inducing wasp

Besbicus heldae, formerly Cynips heldae, also known as the thorny gall wasp or thorn gall wasp, is an uncommon species of cynipid wasp that induces bud galls on Oregon oak and valley oak trees on the west coast of North America. Fresh gall are rose pink, measure 6–16 mm in diameter, and have a "mealy-granular" surface and possibly overlapping, disorderly looking "spikes". Galls are detachable and turn brown as they age. This gall superficially resembles the galls induced by Burnettweldia corallina or Cynips quercusechinus.

== See also ==
- Besbicus
