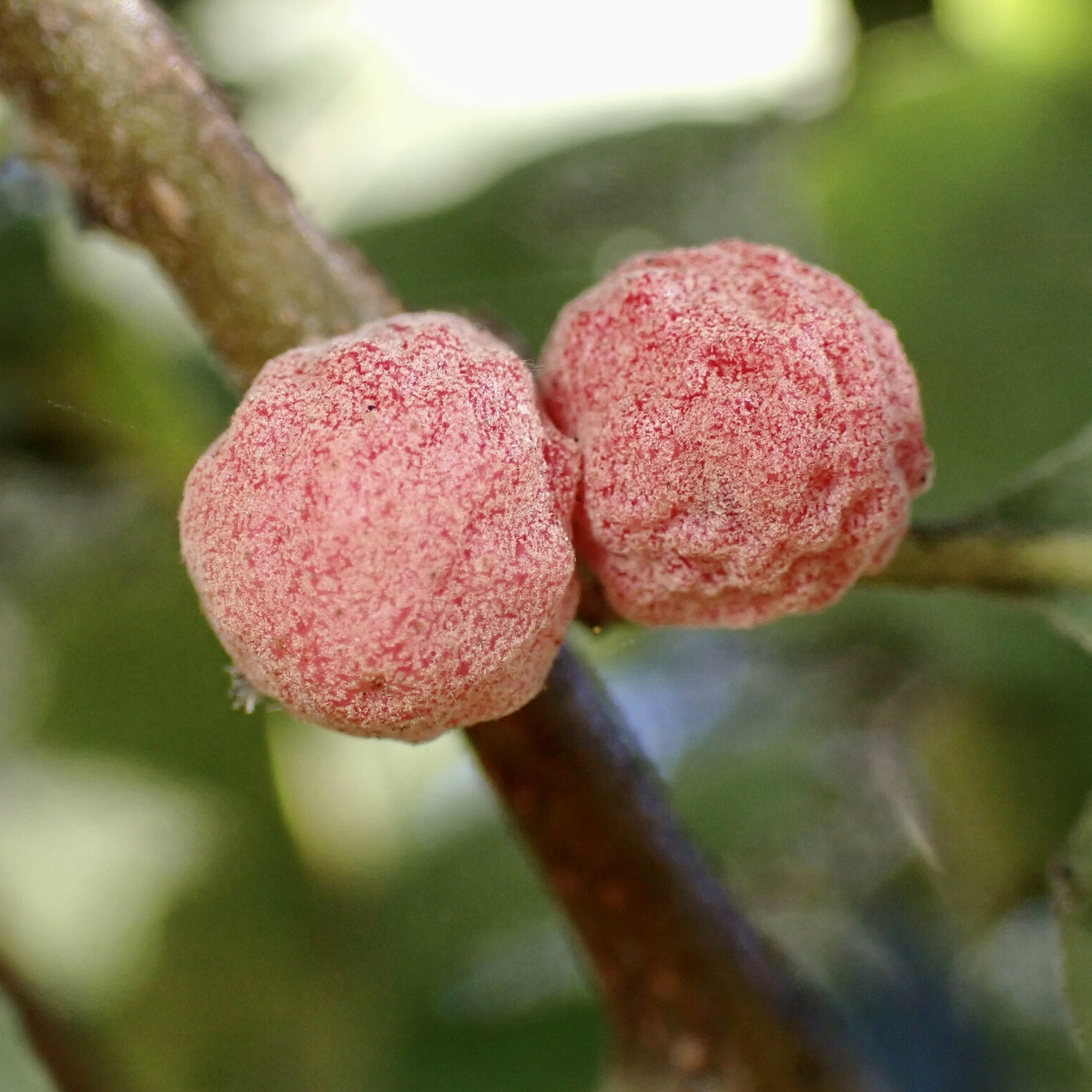
- Galls produced by Besbicus conspicuus, Sonoma County, California, 2023

Scientific classification
- Kingdom: Animalia
- Phylum: Arthropoda
- Clade: Pancrustacea
- Class: Insecta
- Order: Hymenoptera
- Family: Cynipidae
- Subfamily: Cynipinae
- Tribe: Cynipini
- Genus: Besbicus (Kinsey, 1929)

= Besbicus (wasp) =

Genus of gall wasp

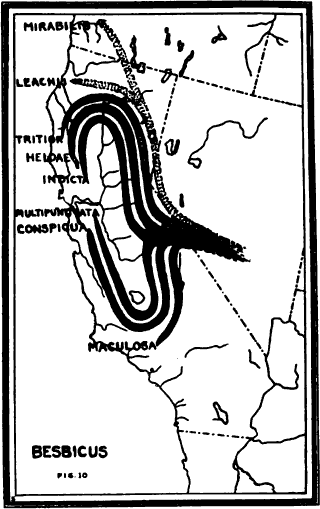
Phylogenetic origins in Besbicus

Besbicus is a genus of gall-inducing cynipid wasp found in North America. Several species now classed as Besbicus were formerly considered to be a part of the genus Cynips. Besbicus was originally described as a subgenus by Alfred Kinsey in 1929. Circa 2010, one group of entomologists noted that it was "possible that the nearctic genera Antron and Besbicus were erroneously synonymized to Cynips". The genus was formally re-established in 2026.

== Taxonomy ==
Besbicus contains the following species:

- Besbicus conspicuus
- Besbicus heldae
- Besbicus mirabilis
- Besbicus maculosus
- Besbicus multipunctatus
