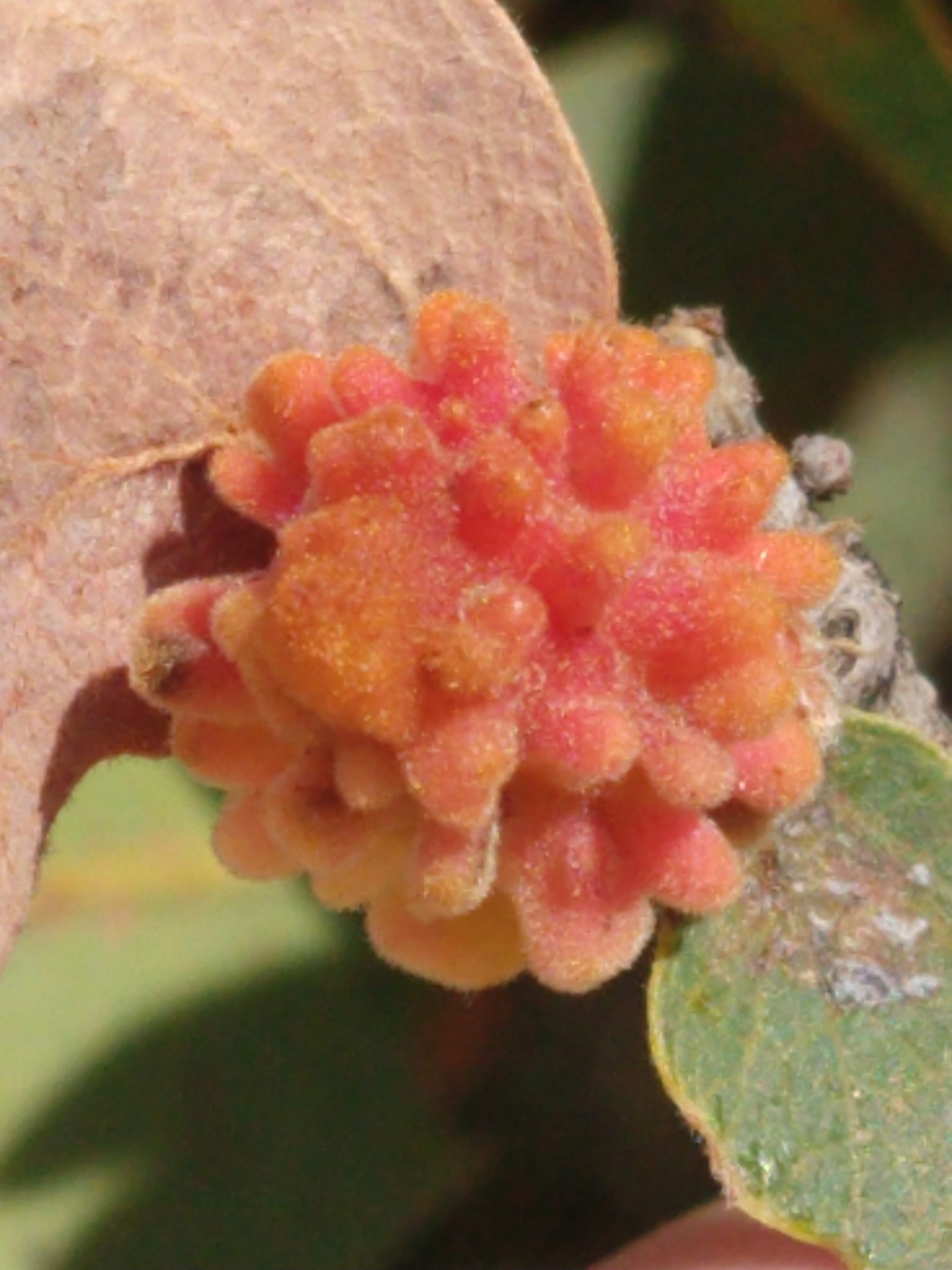

Scientific classification
- Kingdom: Animalia
- Phylum: Arthropoda
- Class: Insecta
- Order: Hymenoptera
- Family: Cynipidae
- Genus: Burnettweldia
- Species: B. corallina

Binomial name
- Burnettweldia corallina (Bassett, 1890)

Synonyms
- Disholcaspis corallina

= Burnettweldia corallina =

North American gall-inducing wasp

Burnettweldia corallina, formerly Disholcaspis corallina, the coral gall wasp, is a species of hymenopteran that induces galls on blue oaks in California in North America. The wasp oviposits at the base of leaf petioles. The detachable galls start out a mottled red-orange-yellow and over time darken to a deep brown and become brittle. This gall superficially resembles the oak galls induced by Besbicus heldae and Cynips quercusechinus.
