= Dyer's oak =

Dyer's oak may refer to two species of oak tree:

- Quercus velutina of Eastern North America
- Quercus lusitanica of Morocco, Portugal, and Spain
