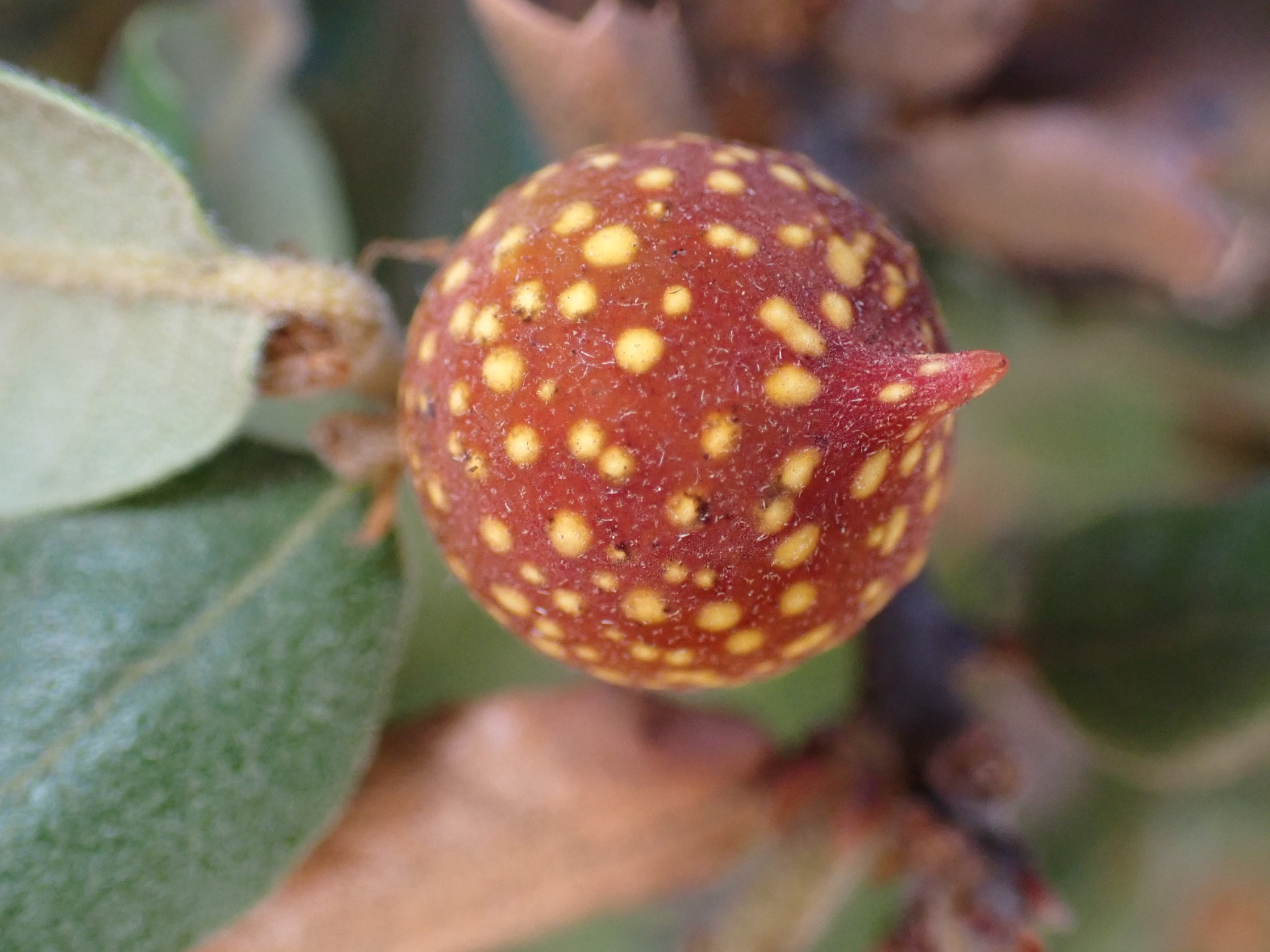
- Gall formed by Burnettweldia plumbella

Scientific classification
- Kingdom: Animalia
- Phylum: Arthropoda
- Class: Insecta
- Order: Hymenoptera
- Family: Cynipidae
- Genus: Burnettweldia
- Species: B. plumbella

Binomial name
- Burnettweldia plumbella Kinsey, 1920

Synonyms
- Disholcaspis plumbella

= Burnettweldia plumbella =

Species of insect

Burnettweldia plumbella, also known as the beaked twig gall wasp, is a species of gall wasp. Previously in the genus Disholcaspis, it was moved into a new genus, Burnettweldia, in 2021. This wasp induces galls on oak trees, including blue oak, leather oak, Muller's oak, and scrub oaks. The galls are up to 15 mm in diameter and brightly colored, coming in either red with yellow spots or green with yellow spots. Their name comes from the galls' pointed tip. Galls are formed in spring and summer, and adults emerge from them in November and December. The adult wasps are 3–4 mm in length.
