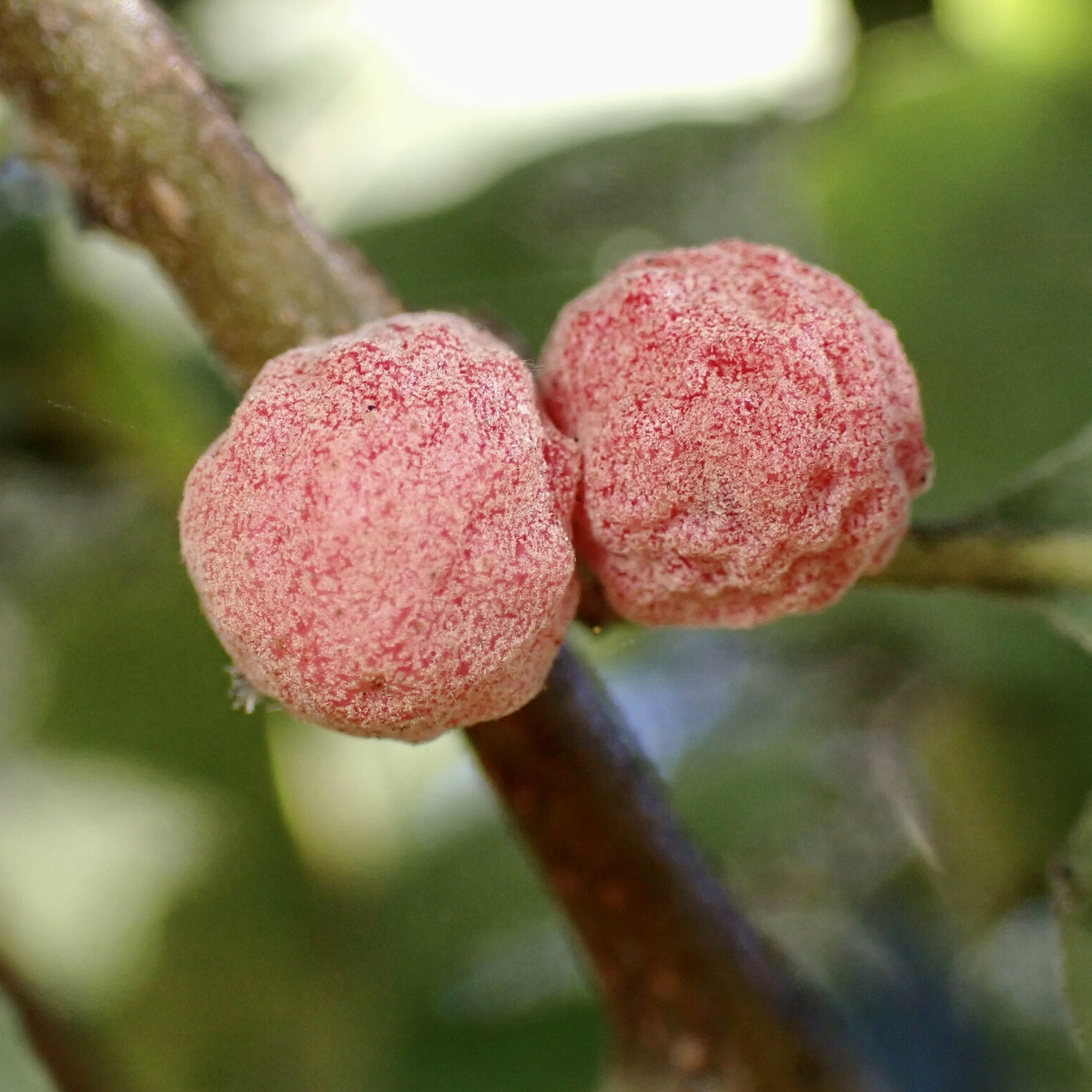
- Sonoma County, California, 2023

Scientific classification
- Kingdom: Animalia
- Phylum: Arthropoda
- Class: Insecta
- Order: Hymenoptera
- Family: Cynipidae
- Genus: Besbicus
- Species: B. conspicuus

Binomial name
- Besbicus conspicuus (Kinsey, 1929)

Synonyms
- Cynips conspicua; Cynips conspicuus Melika & Abrahamson, 2002; Cynips multipunctata var conspicua Kinsey, 1929

= Besbicus conspicuus =

North American gall-inducing wasp

Besbicus conspicuus, formerly Cynips conspicuus, also known as the fuzzy gall wasp, is a common species of cynipid wasp that induces globular stem galls on white oak trees on the west coast of North America. This gall is solid but for the central larval chamber. After the wasp emerges, beetles sometimes chew through the husk to consume the tissue inside. Besbicus conspicuus galls are sometimes mistaken for Disholcaspis washingtonensis galls. This wasp is found west of the Sierra Nevada range in California in North America.

== See also ==
- Besbicus
