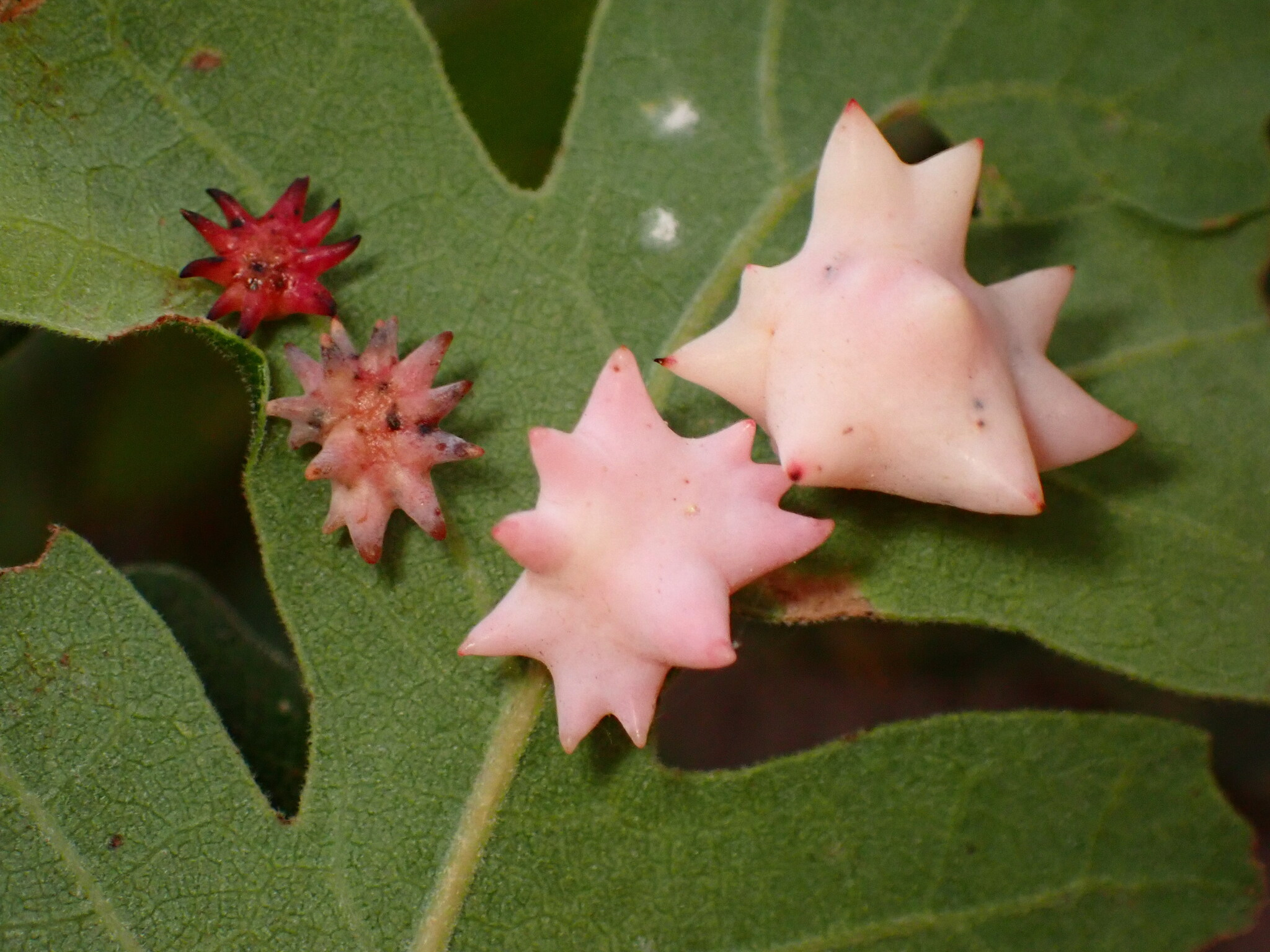
- Cynips douglasii unisexual generation galls, California

Scientific classification
- Kingdom: Animalia
- Phylum: Arthropoda
- Clade: Pancrustacea
- Class: Insecta
- Order: Hymenoptera
- Family: Cynipidae
- Genus: Cynips
- Species: C. douglasii

Binomial name
- Cynips douglasii (Ashmead, 1896)

Synonyms
- Antron douglasii

= Cynips douglasii =

Species of wasp

Cynips douglasii, the spined turbaned gall wasp, is a species of gall wasp in the family Cynipidae. It induces galls in valley oaks, blue oak, and California scrub oak. The leaf galls induced by the parthenogenic, unisexual generation in summer are noted for their spines and can be white, purple, or pink. They can be up to 10 millimetres (0.39 in) wide and 15 millimetres (0.59 in) high. Adult females emerge from these galls in winter. The bisexual generation induces rounder, green bud galls in spring.

== Gallery ==
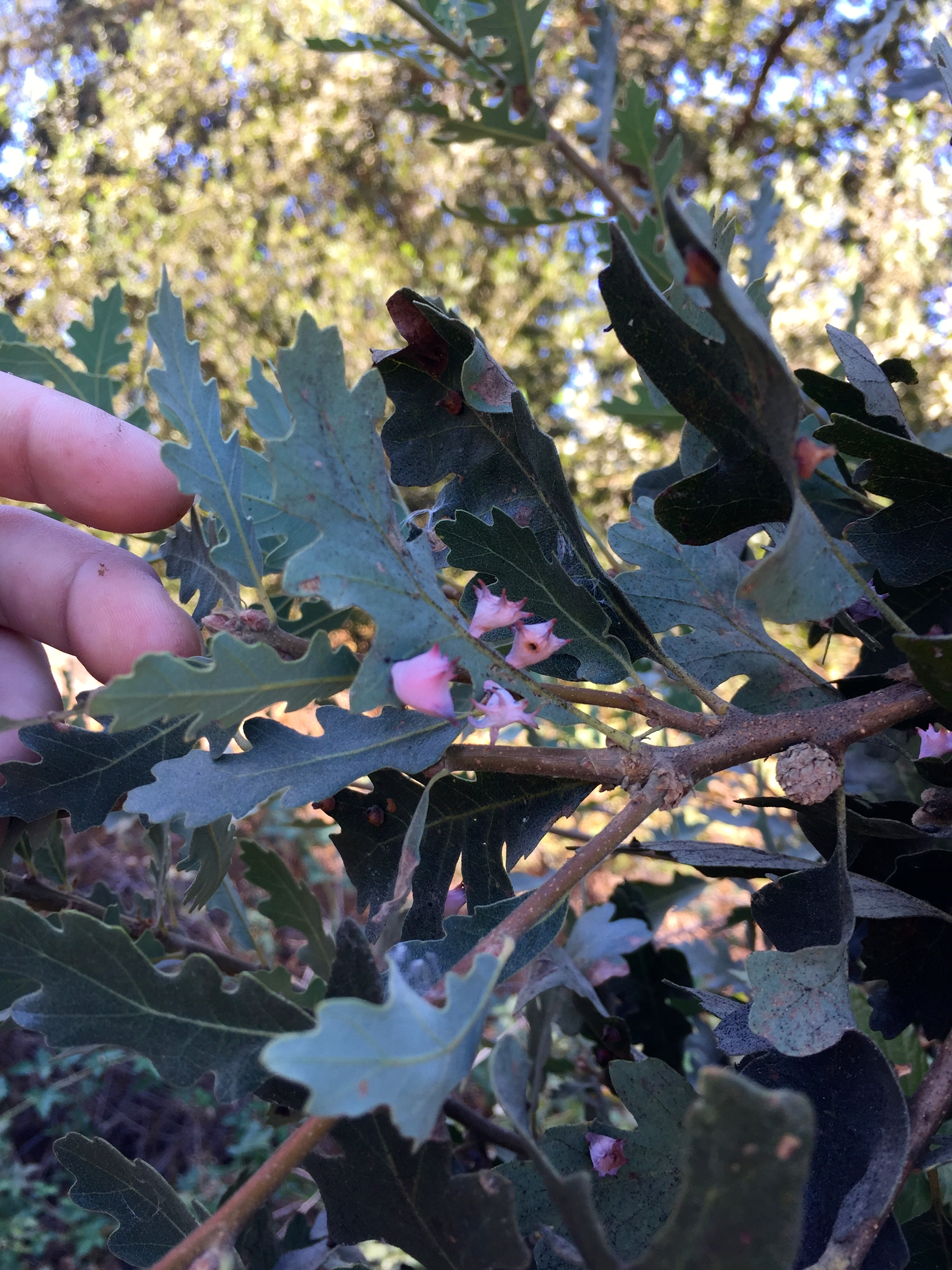
Spined turbaned gall wasp on a hybrid oak.

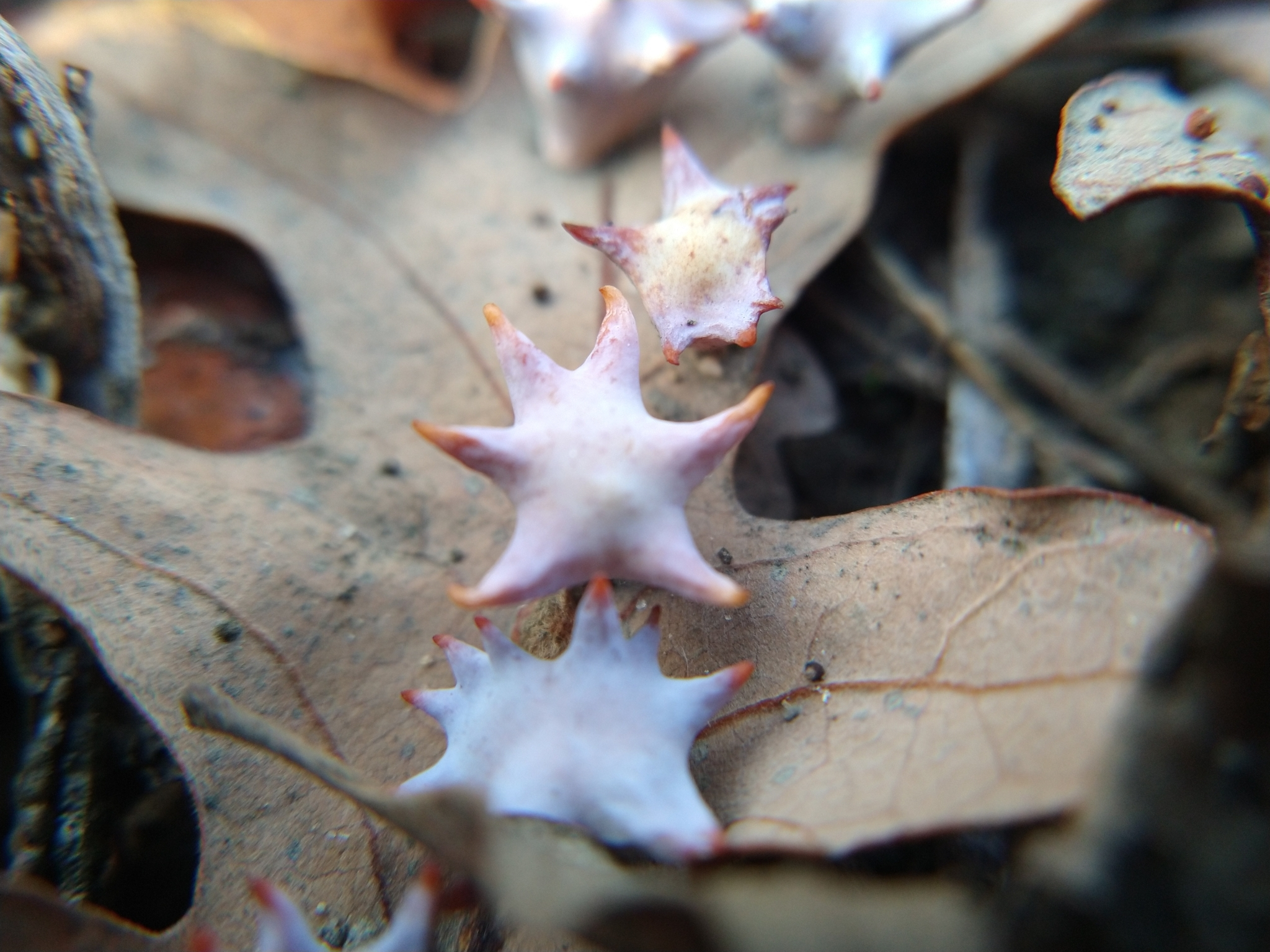
Galls on a dead leaf.

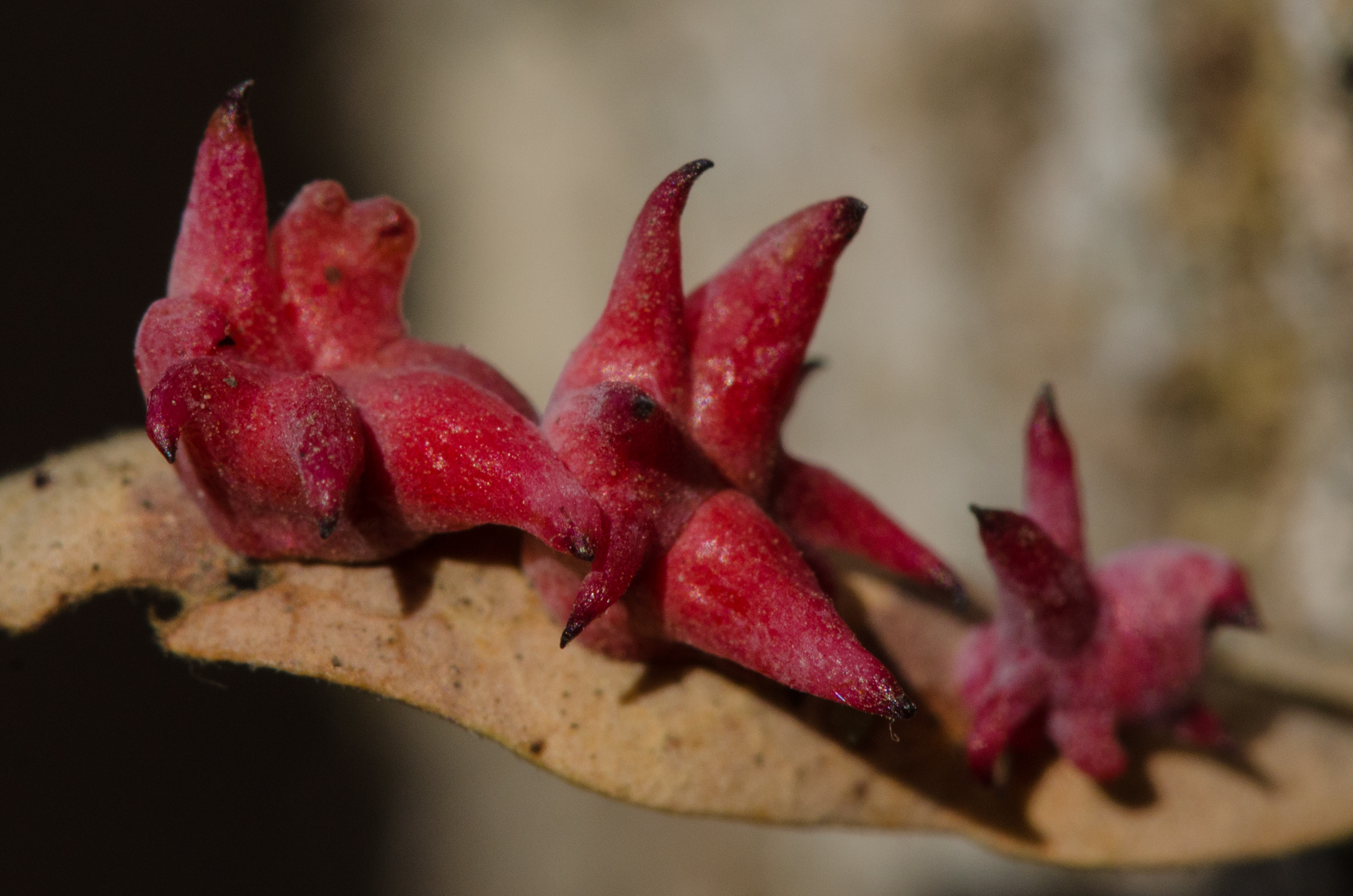
Red galls

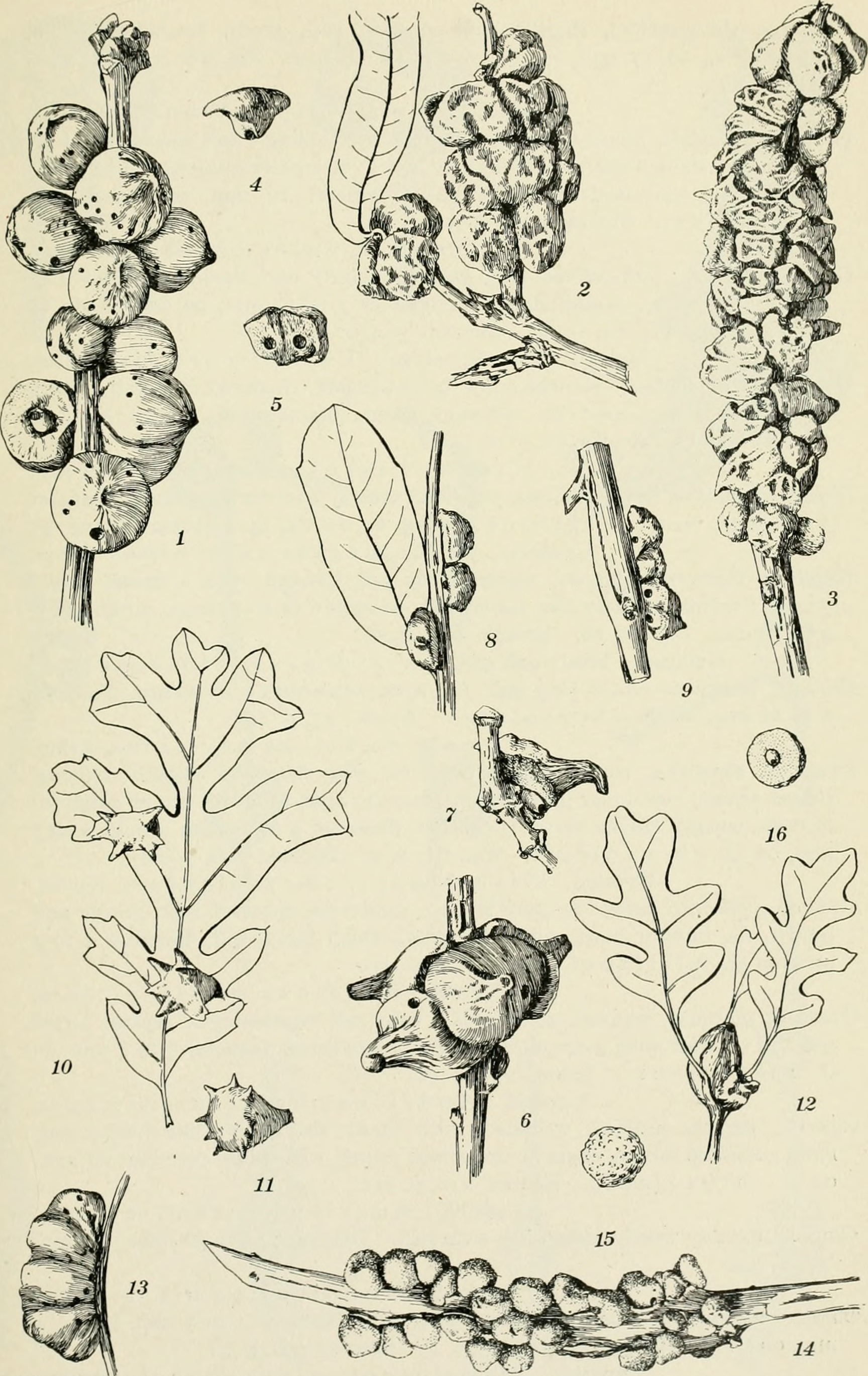
Key to American insect Galls, including Cynips douglassi.
