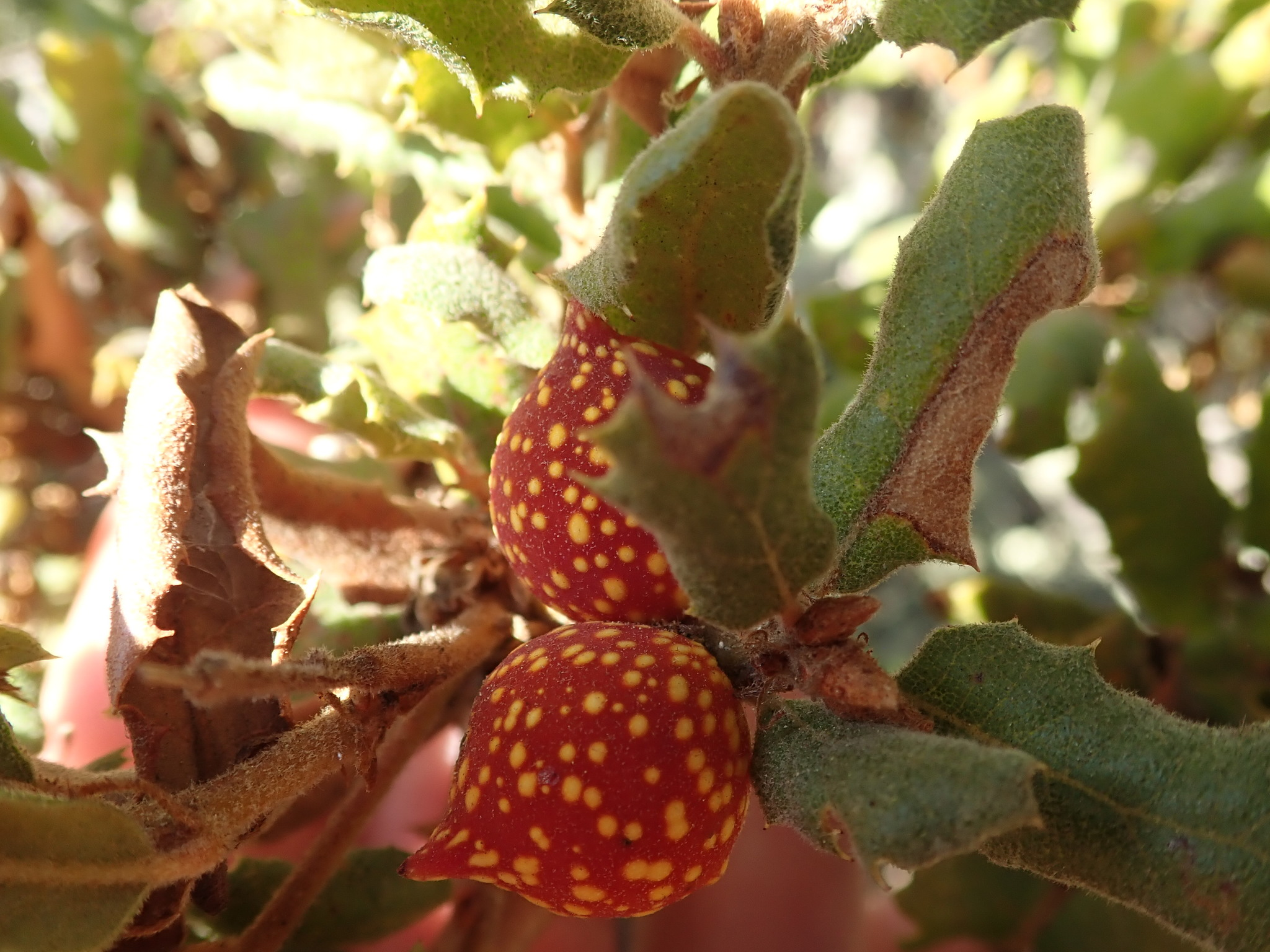
- The galls formed by Burnettweldia plumbella

Scientific classification
- Kingdom: Animalia
- Phylum: Arthropoda
- Class: Insecta
- Order: Hymenoptera
- Family: Cynipidae
- Genus: Burnettweldia; Pujade-Villar, Melika & Nicholls, 2021

= Burnettweldia =

Genus of insects

Burnettweldia is a genus of oak gall wasps in the Nearctic.

== Species ==
Burnettweldia includes five species:

- Burnettweldia californicordazi Cuesta-Porta, Melika & Pujade-Villar
- Burnettweldia conalis Weld
- Burnettweldia corallina Bassett - coral gall wasp
- Burnettweldia plumbella Kinsey - beaked twig gall wasp
- Burnettweldia washingtonensis Gillette - round-gall wasp

== See also ==
- Disholandricus
