= Antron (wasp) =

Scientific classification
- Kingdom: Animalia
- Phylum: Arthropoda
- Class: Insecta
- Order: Hymenoptera
- Family: Cynipidae
- Subfamily: Cynipinae
- Tribe: Cynipini
- Genus: Antron; Kinsey, 1930

Genus of wasps

Antron is a genus of gall wasps in the tribe Cynipini, the oak gall wasps. Some authors have included it within the genus Cynips but it was recently resurrected. The genus was established by Alfred Kinsey in 1930.

== Species ==
Species in this genus include:

- Antron lovellae Melika, Nicholls & Stone, 2021
- Antron tomkursari Melika, Nicholls & Stone, 2021

== See also ==
- Besbicus (wasp)
