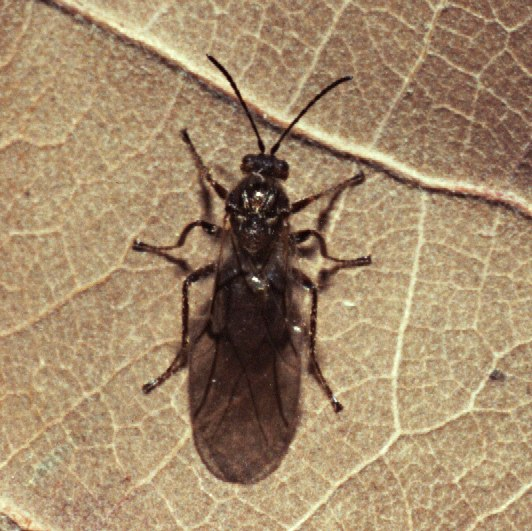

Scientific classification
- Kingdom: Animalia
- Phylum: Arthropoda
- Clade: Pancrustacea
- Class: Insecta
- Order: Hymenoptera
- Family: Cynipidae
- Genus: Cynips
- Species: C. quercusfolii

Binomial name
- Cynips quercusfolii Linnaeus, 1758

= Cynips quercusfolii =

Gall wasp species in the genus Cynips

Cynips quercusfolii, also known as the cherry gall wasp and common oak gall wasp, is a gall wasp species in the genus Cynips and family Cynipidae. The species is important for the production of commercial nutgall formed on Quercus lusitanica (the gall oak). Galls are located on the underside of leaves, with the majority of galls being on the second and third veins from the petiole of the leaf.

== Life cycle ==
The cherry gall wasp (Cynips quercusfolii) possesses a heterogonic lifecycle. In central Europe, the asexual first generation of females emerges during late autumn or winter. These individuals oviposit within dormant lateral buds of oak (Quercus) tree species. Host species used include Quercus lusitanica, Quercus robur and Quercus petraea.

Subsequently, in spring, small red galls develop from these buds. The second generation, including both females and males, emerges from these galls in early summer, usually in June. Shortly after their emergence, the males and females mate. Females then deposit fertilized eggs into the veins on the undersides of oak leaves. Over the course of the summer, these eggs mature within the leaves, forming large spherical galls with a single chamber. As autumn arrives, the galls containing pupae or mature females fall from the trees along with the leaves. A new generation of asexual females will then emerge during late autumn or winter to repeat the life cycle.

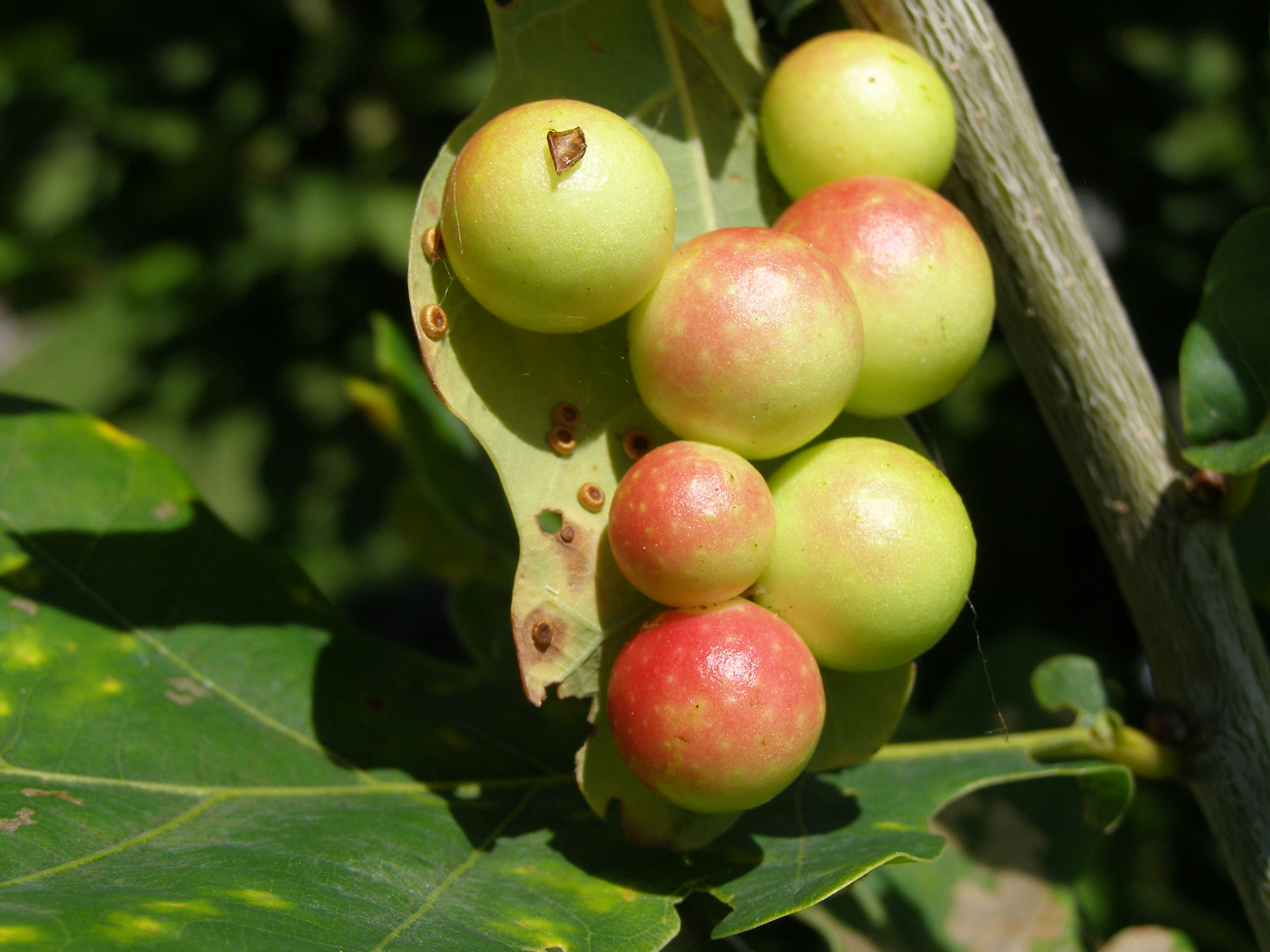
Young Cherry Galls

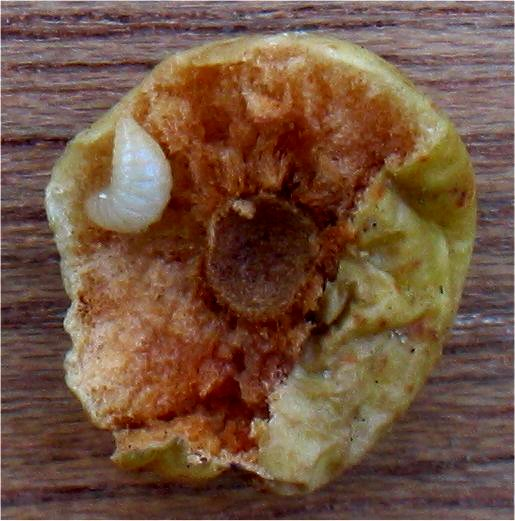
Developing Larva

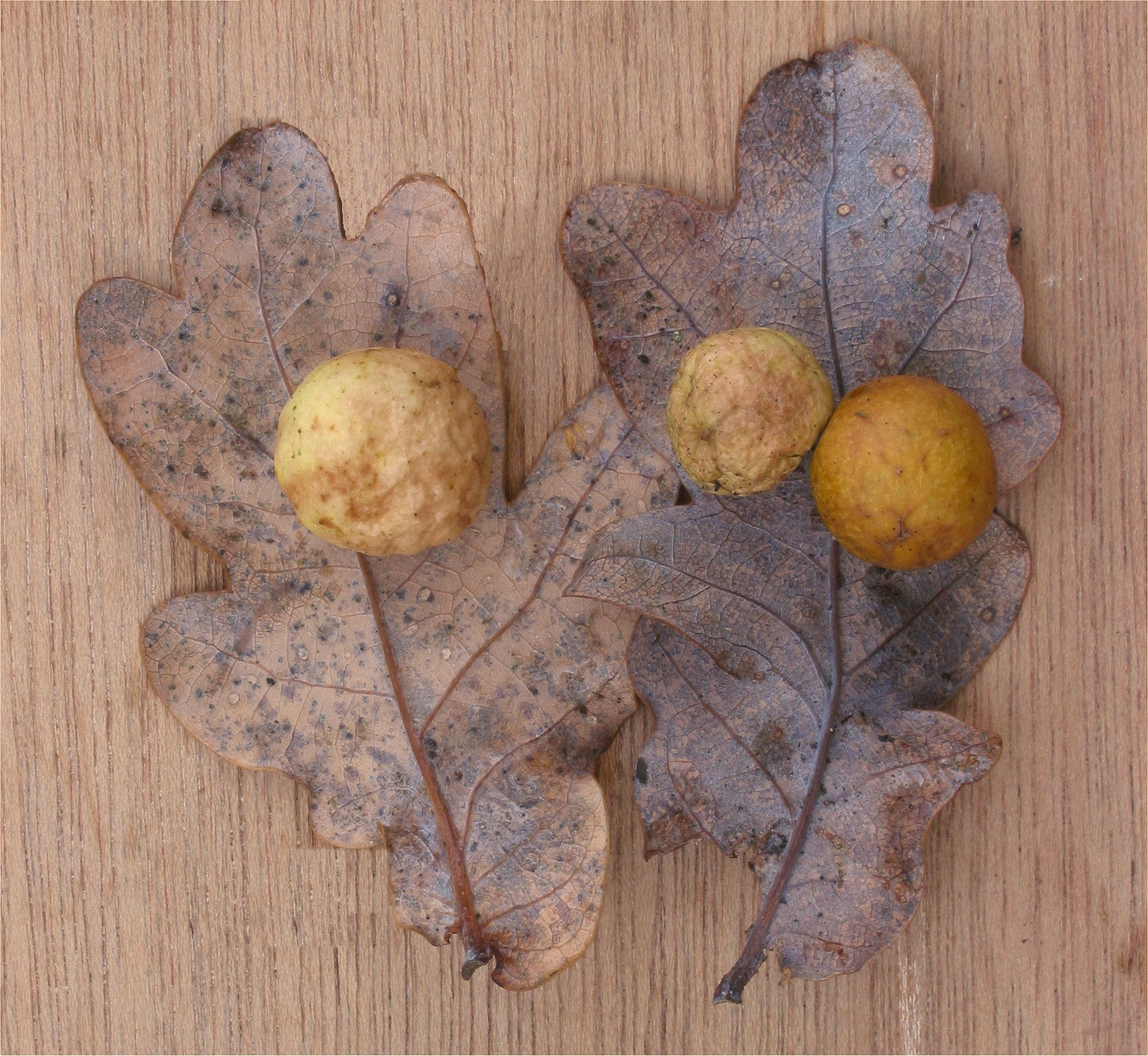
Mature Cherry Galls

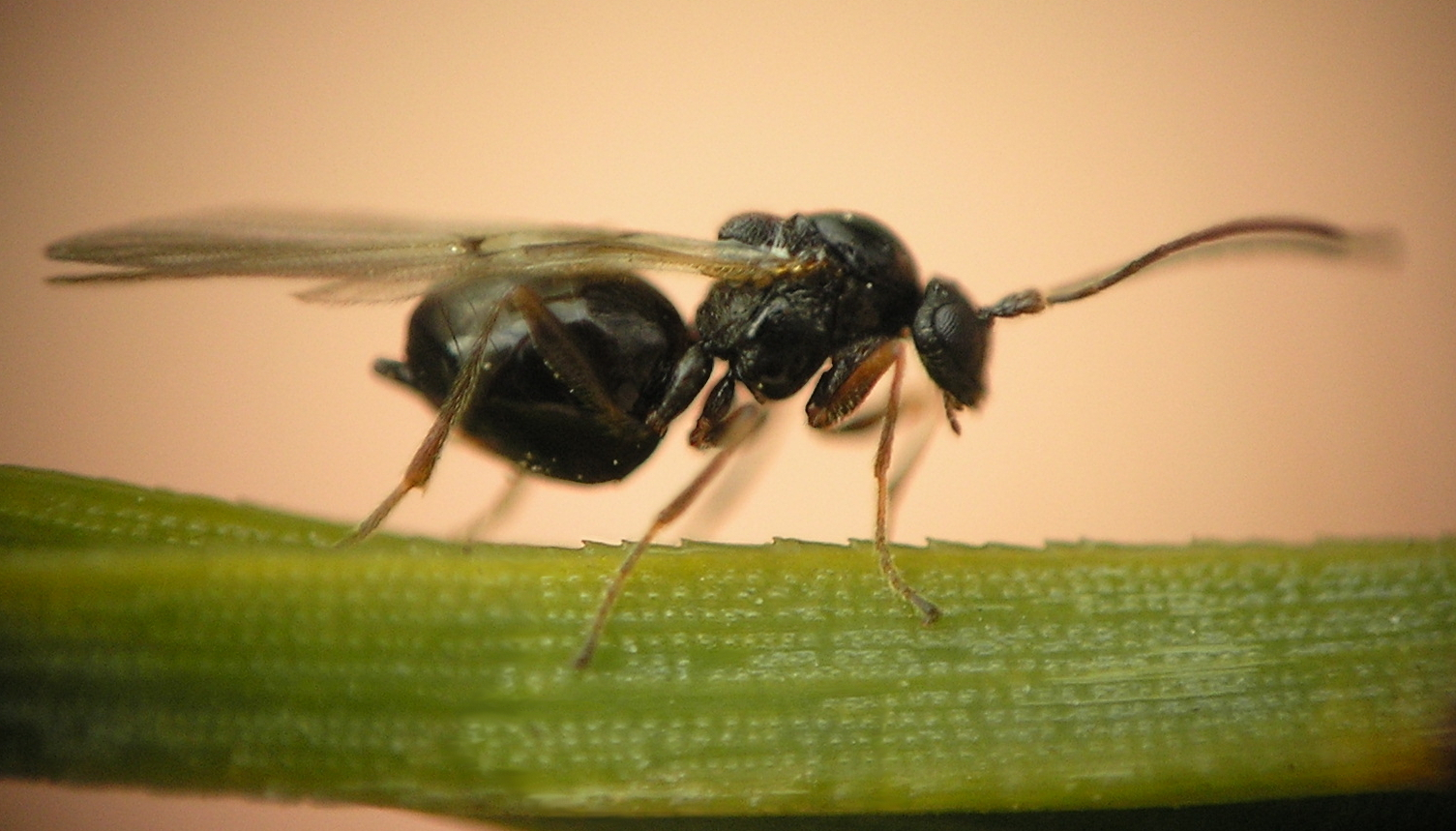
Mature C. quercusfolii
