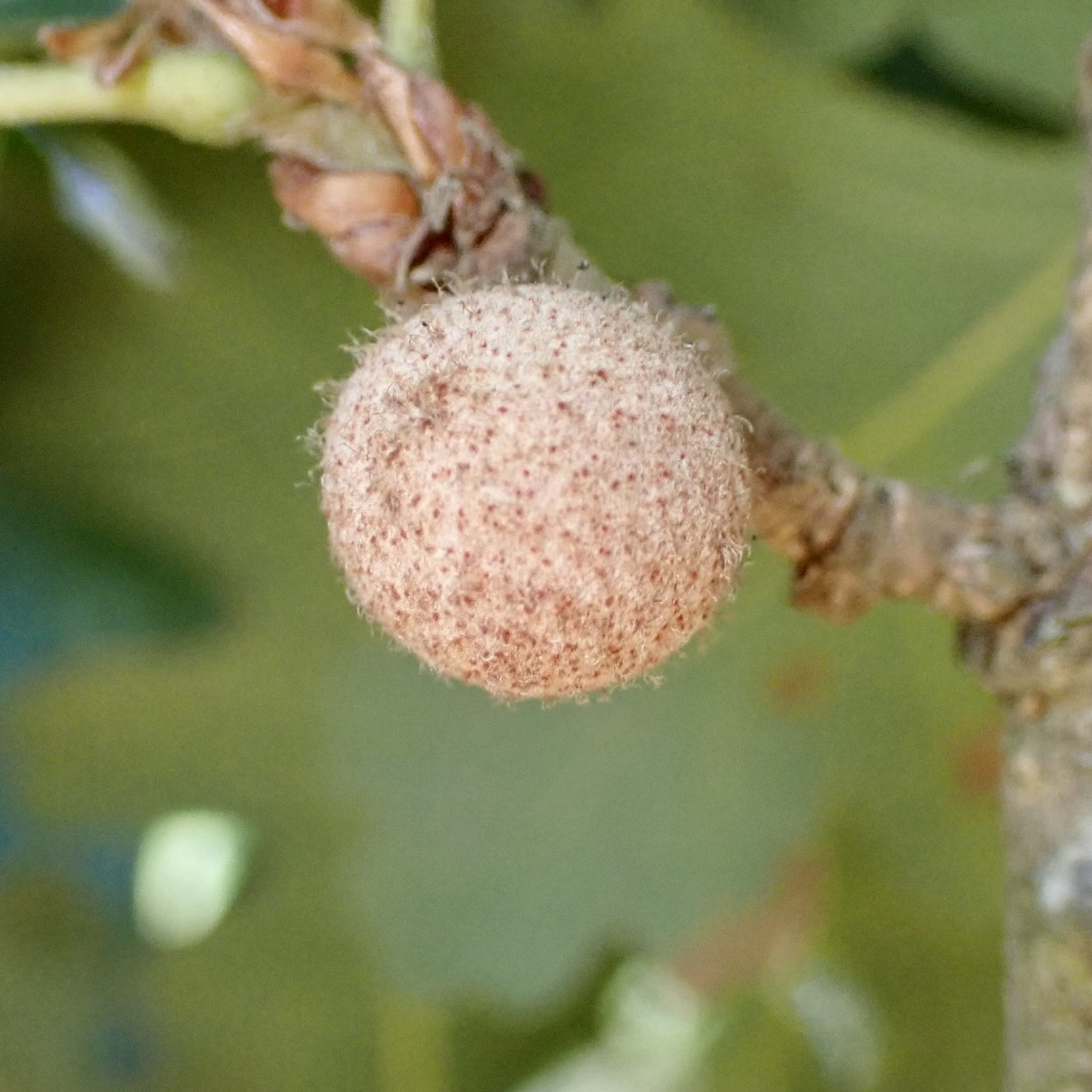
- Sonoma County, California, 2023

Scientific classification
- Kingdom: Animalia
- Phylum: Arthropoda
- Class: Insecta
- Order: Hymenoptera
- Family: Cynipidae
- Genus: Burnettweldia
- Species: B. washingtonensis

Binomial name
- Burnettweldia washingtonensis (Gillette, 1894)

Synonyms
- Disholcaspis washingtonensis

= Burnettweldia washingtonensis =

North American gall-inducing wasp

Burnettweldia washingtonensis, formerly Disholcaspis washingtonensis, the fuzzy gall wasp, is a species of hymenopteran that induces stem galls on white oaks on the Pacific coast of North America. The detachable galls have a little stem or neck, are gray or beige and fuzzy, and measure about 8–10 mm in diameter. The larval chamber is located at the center of the ball, the interior of which is otherwise chocolate brown. Older galls may appear pitted. The locally common galls induced by this wasp are sometimes mistaken for the galls induced by Besbicus conspicuus.
