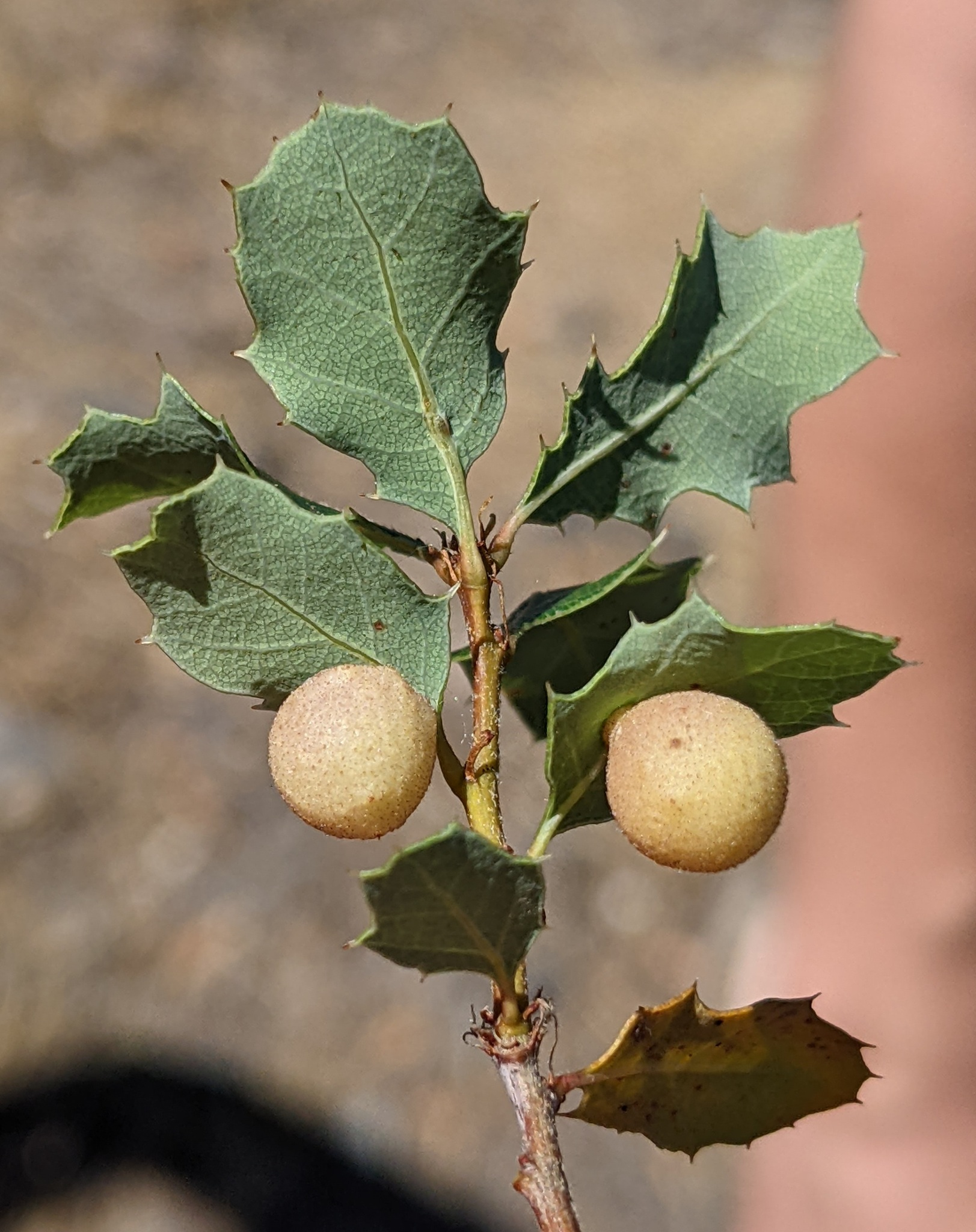
- Butte County, California, 2023

Scientific classification
- Kingdom: Animalia
- Phylum: Arthropoda
- Class: Insecta
- Order: Hymenoptera
- Family: Cynipidae
- Genus: Besbicus
- Species: B. maculosus

Binomial name
- Besbicus maculosus (Kinsey, 1929)

Synonyms
- Cynips maculosa; Cynips maculosus; Andricus maculosus

= Besbicus maculosus =

North American gall-inducing wasp

Besbicus maculosus, formerly Andricus maculosus and Cynips maculosa, also known as the pear gall wasp, is an uncommon species of cynipid wasp that induces galls on oak trees on the west coast of North America. The wasp oviposits on leather oak and scrub oak leaves. Fresh galls are green. This wasp has been observed in California.

== See also ==
- Besbicus
