= Burnettweldia conalis =

Scientific classification
- Kingdom: Animalia
- Phylum: Arthropoda
- Class: Insecta
- Order: Hymenoptera
- Family: Cynipidae
- Genus: Burnettweldia
- Species: B. conalis

Binomial name
- Burnettweldia conalis (Weld, 1926)

Synonyms
- Disholcaspis conalis

North American gall-inducing wasp

Burnettweldia conalis, formerly Disholcaspis conalis, the witches' hat gall wasp, is a species of hymenopteran that induces stem galls on Oregon oaks in North America. The conical stem galls look like witches' hats lined up on a stick. The base of the detachable gall appears to grip the stem. Typical galls are 10 to 18 millimeters tall. Young galls are green, aging galls are fuzzy, and old galls are beige. The type species was collected in Sequoia National Park.
