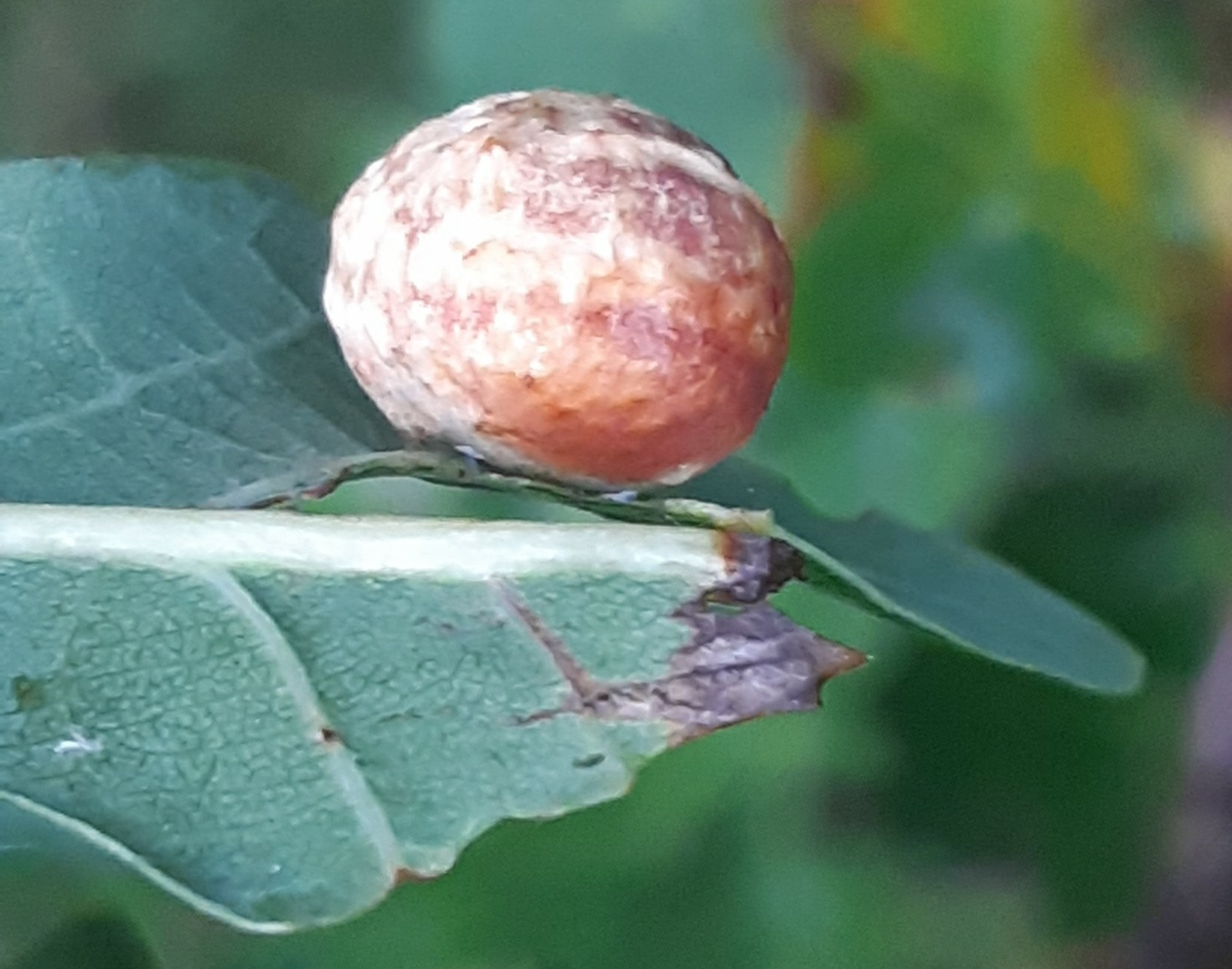
- Leaf gall caused by Cynips longiventris

Scientific classification
- Kingdom: Animalia
- Phylum: Arthropoda
- Class: Insecta
- Order: Hymenoptera
- Family: Cynipidae
- Genus: Cynips
- Species: C. longiventris

Binomial name
- Cynips longiventris Hartig, 1840

= Cynips longiventris =

Species of wasp

Cynips longiventris is a species of gall wasp in the family Cynipidae. It is found in Europe.
