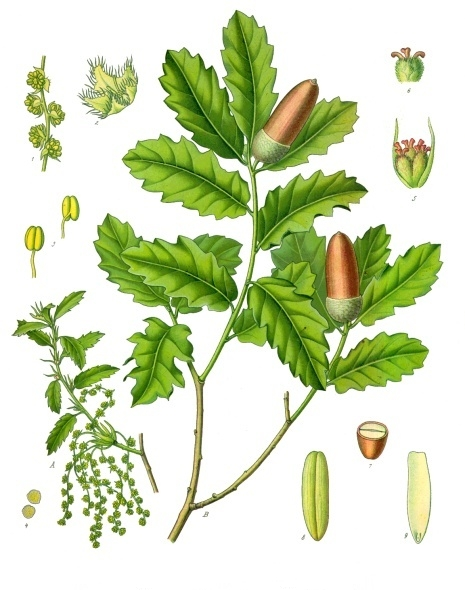
- 1897 illustration from Franz Eugen Köhler, Köhler's Medizinal-Pflanzen

Conservation status
- Least Concern (IUCN 3.1)

Scientific classification
- Kingdom: Plantae
- Clade: Embryophytes
- Clade: Tracheophytes
- Clade: Spermatophytes
- Clade: Angiosperms
- Clade: Eudicots
- Clade: Rosids
- Order: Fagales
- Family: Fagaceae
- Genus: Quercus
- Subgenus: Quercus subg. Quercus
- Section: Quercus sect. Quercus
- Species: Q. lusitanica

Binomial name
- Quercus lusitanica Lam.

Synonyms
- List: Quercus fruticosa Brot.; Quercus humilis Lam., illegitimate homonym; Quercus valentina Cav.; Quercus ovalifolia Bosc ex Pers.; Quercus glauca Bosc ex Loisel.; Quercus australis Link; Quercus undulata K.Koch; Quercus prasina Bosc ex Endl.; Quercus aegilopifolia Boiss. ex Endl.; Quercus muricata Palau ex Willk. & Lange; Quercus quexigo Cook ex Willk. & Lange; Quercus aegylopifolia Boiss. ex A.DC.; Quercus brachycarpa Kotschy ex A.DC.; Quercus brachycarpa Guss. ex Parl.; Quercus rigida K.Koch ex A.DC.; Quercus baetica H.Buek; Quercus zang Dippel

= Quercus lusitanica =

Species of oak tree

Quercus lusitanica, commonly known as gall oak, Lusitanian oak, or dyer's oak, is a species of oak native to Portugal, Spain (Galicia and western Andalucia) and Morocco. Quercus lusitanica is the source of commercial nutgalls. These galls are produced by the infection from the insect Cynips gallae tinctoriae. They are used for dyeing.

Several other species are known colloquially as "gall oaks;" indeed, galls can be found on a large percentage of oak species. The specific epithet "lusitanica" refers to the ancient Roman Province of Lusitania, corresponding roughly to present-day Portugal and Extremadura in Spain.

== Description ==
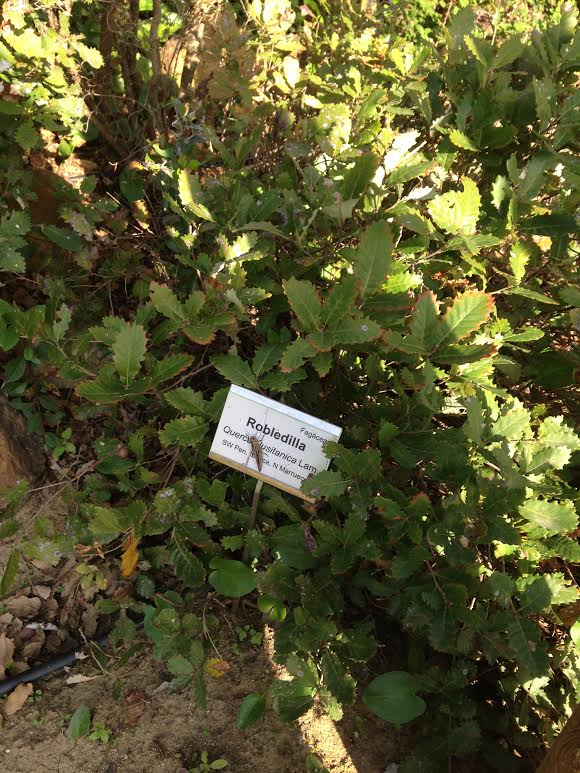
Quercus lusitanica

Quercus lusitanica is a stoloniferous shrub, usually prostrate, under 3 m in height.

== Taxonomy ==
It was incorrectly named Q. humilis, later Q. fruticosa and its current name was incorrectly used to identify other Gall oaks from the Iberian Peninsula and North Africa. This resulted in numerous taxonomy errors in the Gall oaks taxa from the occidental and oriental Mediterranean Basin.

== Distribution and habitat ==
Quercus lusitanica is native to the Iberian Peninsula (in Portugal and western Andalusia, Spain, also rare on Galicia) and Morocco It is commonly associated in oak and pine forests and does well in acidic soils. It favors mild coastal Mediterranean climates but it also succeeds in moist, mild, maritime climates. It is relatively sensitive to cold temperatures and is hardy down to −8 °C (18 °F). It inhabits sandy or gravelly soils up to 600 m (2,000 ft) in elevation.

== Threats ==
No serious threats were found in Portugal, though in Andalusia this plant has been listed as Near Threatened due to fires, silviculture and grazing ungulates. The main threat to the conservation of genetic diversity of this species is the hybridization with the oak neighbors (Holm Oak, Cork Oak, Kermes Oak, Pyrenean Oak).
