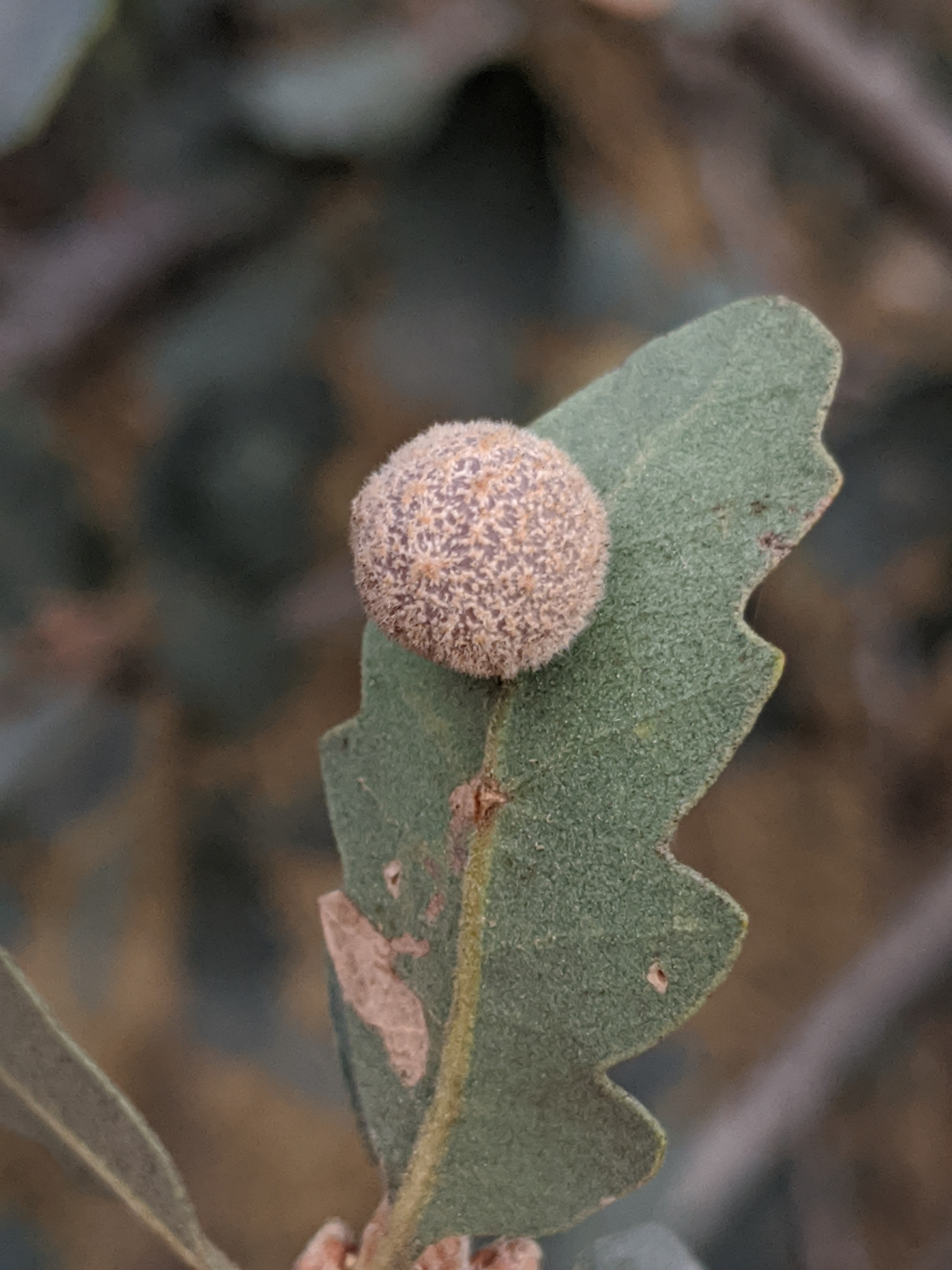
- San Luis Obispo County, California, 2019

Scientific classification
- Kingdom: Animalia
- Phylum: Arthropoda
- Class: Insecta
- Order: Hymenoptera
- Family: Cynipidae
- Genus: Besbicus
- Species: B. multipunctatus

Binomial name
- Besbicus multipunctatus (Kinsey, 1929)

Synonyms
- Cynips multipunctata; Cynips multipunctata; Dryophanta multipunctata

= Besbicus multipunctatus =

Species of wasps

Besbicus multipunctatus, formerly Cynips multipunctatus, also known as the gray midrib gall wasp, is a common species of cynipid wasp that induces galls on oak trees on the west coast of North America. The wasp oviposits on the midrib of the underside of blue oak leaves. The galls induced by this wasp are solid, except for the large central larval chamber, and are detachable. This wasp is found primarily, but not exclusively, in California.

== See also ==
- Besbicus
