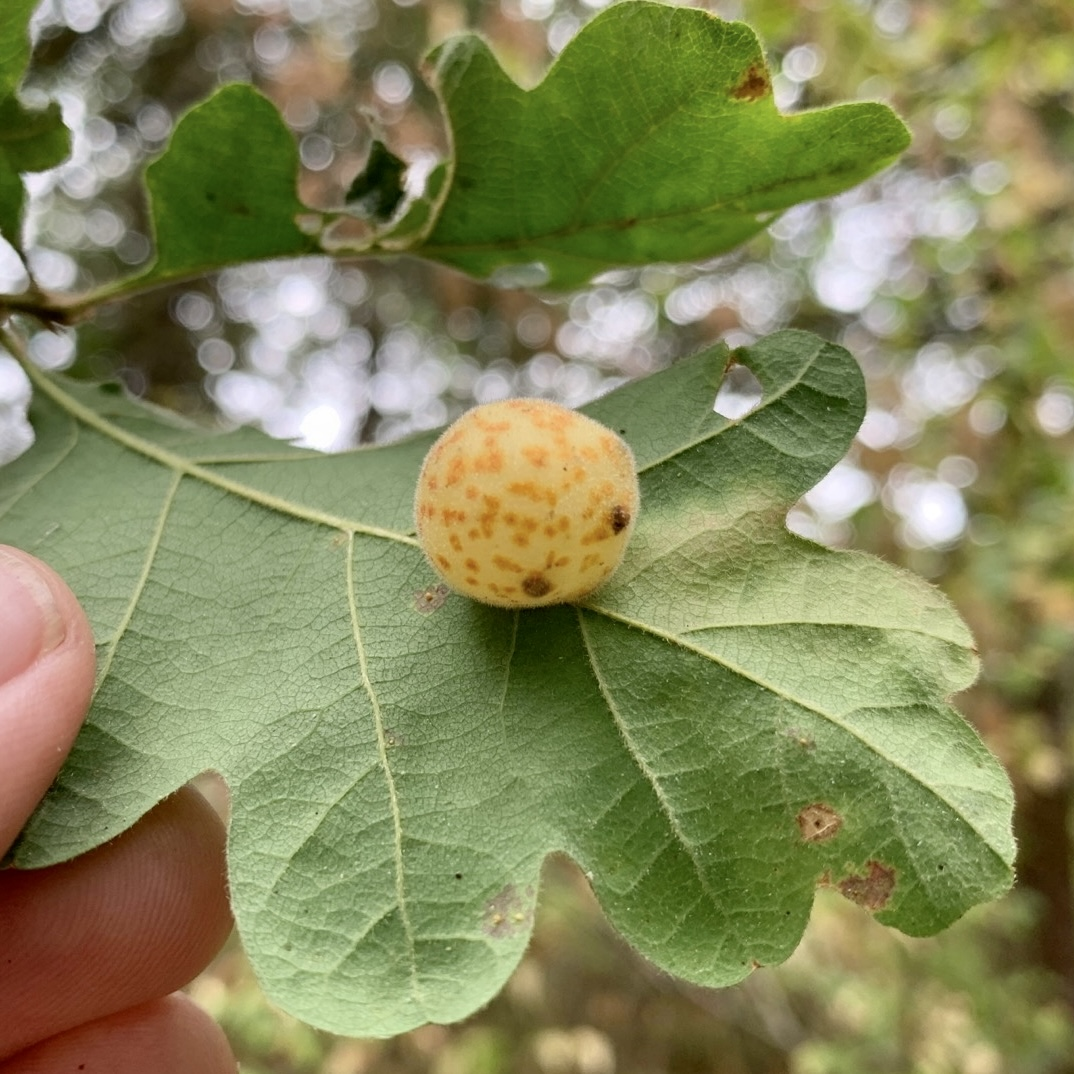
- Olympia, Washington, 2023

Scientific classification
- Kingdom: Animalia
- Phylum: Arthropoda
- Class: Insecta
- Order: Hymenoptera
- Family: Cynipidae
- Genus: Besbicus
- Species: B. mirabilis

Binomial name
- Besbicus mirabilis (Kinsey, 1922)

Synonyms
- Cynips mirabilis

= Besbicus mirabilis =

North American gall-inducing wasp

Besbicus mirabilis, formerly Cynips mirabilis, also known as the speckled gall wasp, is a common species of cynipid wasp that produces galls on oak trees in North America. This wasp oviposits on the midrib of the underside (with rare dorsal-side exceptions) of Oregon oak leaves. One to three detachable galls per leaf have been observed. The larval chamber is at the center of the gall, connected to the husk by slender, radiating fibers. The second generation of this wasp induces bud galls. The galls may be parasitized by moth larva (Melissopus latiferreanus) or eaten by earwigs or other enterprising arthropods before the larva complete their development. This wasp is present on the Pacific coast of North America from British Columbia to northern California (above the San Francisco Bay).

== See also ==
- Besbicus
- Oak apple
