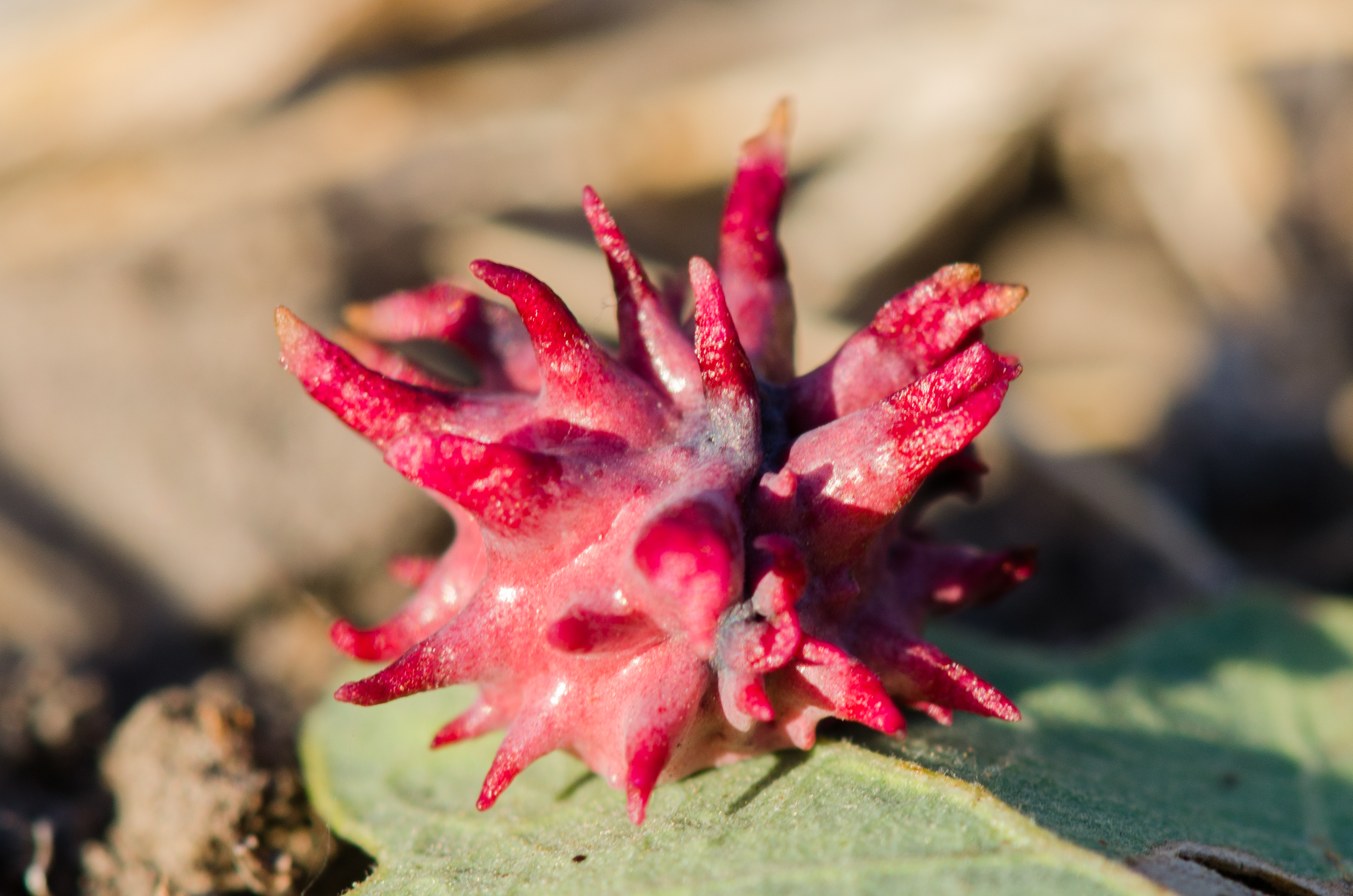
- Gall formed by Cynips quercusechinus

Scientific classification
- Kingdom: Animalia
- Phylum: Arthropoda
- Class: Insecta
- Order: Hymenoptera
- Family: Cynipidae
- Genus: Cynips
- Species: C. quercusechinus

Binomial name
- Cynips quercusechinus Osten Sacken, 1870

Synonyms
- Antron quercusechinus

= Cynips quercusechinus =

Urchin gall wasp

Species of wasp

Cynips quercusechinus, the urchin gall wasp, is a species of gall wasp in the family Cynipidae. It induces galls in the leaves and leaf buds of blue oak and scrub oak. Like other oak gall wasps, it has two generations: a bisexual generation, and a parthenogenic female generation. In spring, the hatching bisexual generation produces hollow green galls in leaf buds. In summer, the unisexual generation induces its galls, which are red or pink and resemble sea urchins, on the undersides of leaves. These galls are about 10 millimetres (0.39 in) in diameter. The galls fall with the leaves in autumn, and the larvae inside of them emerge as adults in the spring and lay their eggs.

This species was first described by Carl Robert Osten-Sacken in 1870 based on specimens from California.
